= Gilgamesh and Aga =

Old Babylonian poem

Envoys of Aga
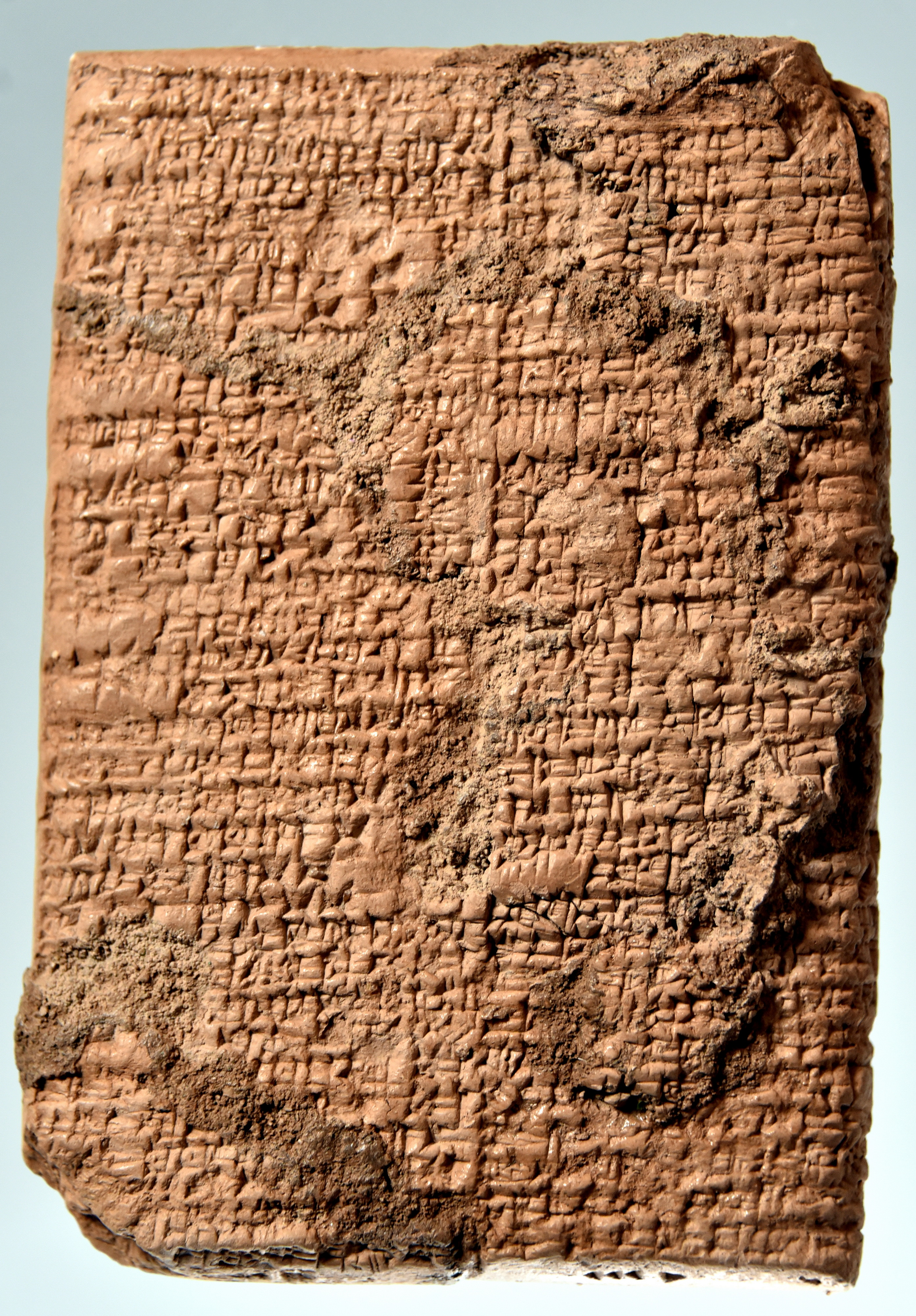
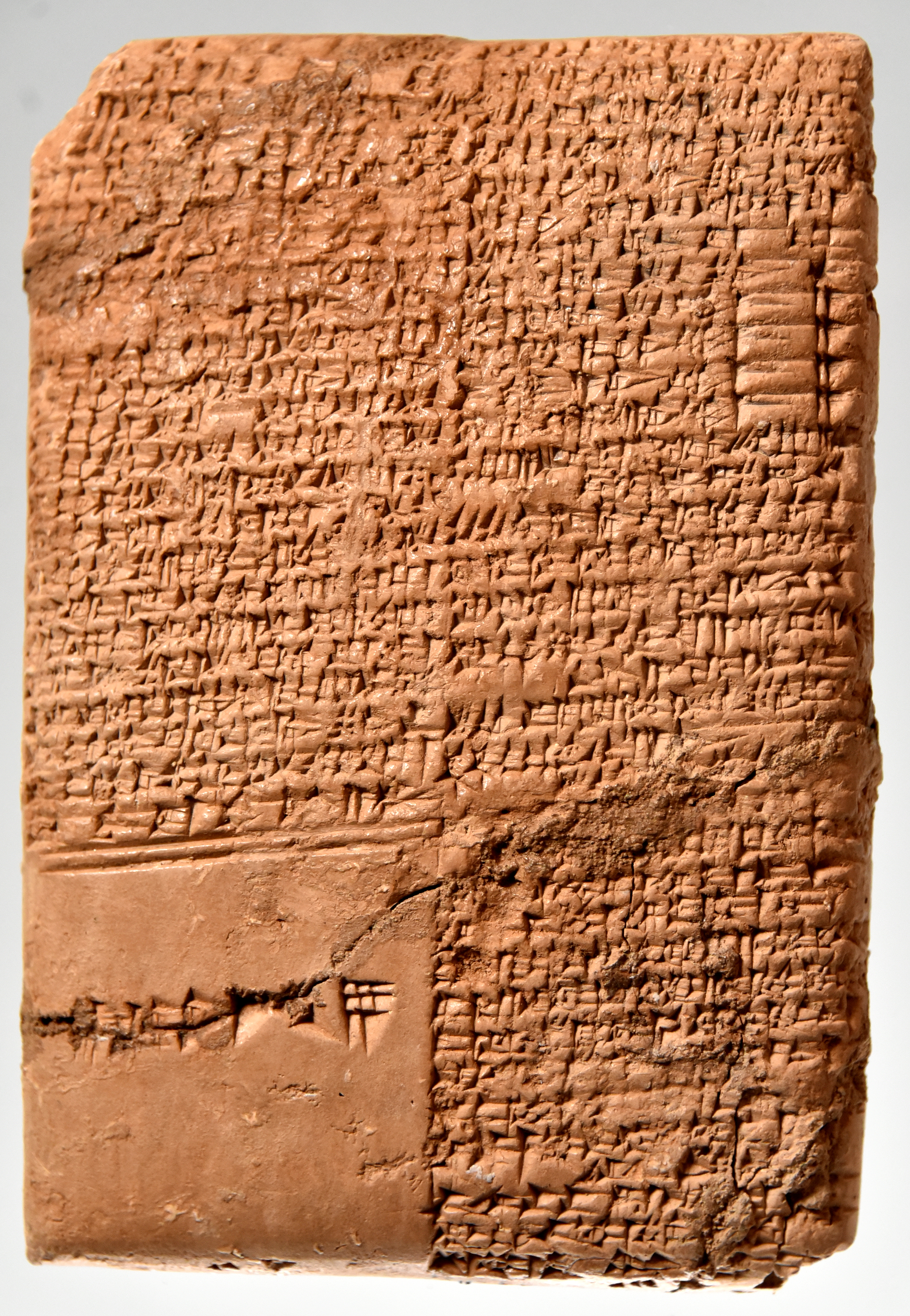
- 𒇽𒆥𒄄𒀀𒀝𒂵 Story of Gilgamesh and Aga. Old Babylonian period, from southern Iraq. Sulaymaniyah Museum, Iraq

Information
- Religion: Mesopotamian religion
- Language: Sumerian
- Period: c. 1900–1600 BCE
- Verses: 114; 115 (fragment H)

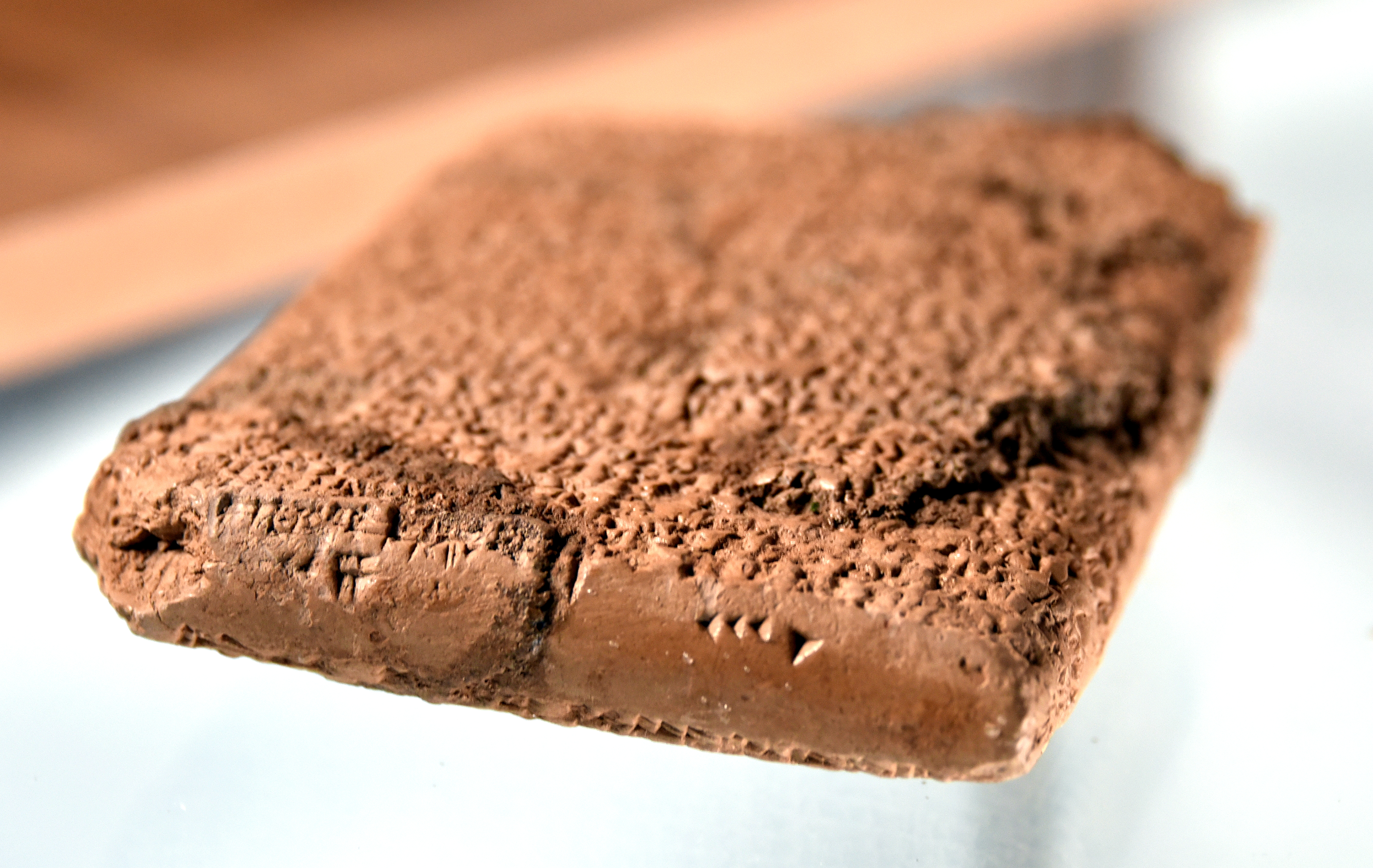
Old Babylonian poem tablet

Gilgamesh and Aga, sometimes referred to as incipit The envoys of Aga (Sumerian: lu2 kin-gi4-a aka), is an Old Babylonian poem written in Sumerian. The only one of the five poems of Gilgamesh that has no mythological aspects, it has been the subject of discussion since its publication in 1935 and later translation in 1949.

The poem records the Kishite siege of Uruk after lord Gilgamesh refused to submit to them, ending in Aga's defeat and consequently the fall of Kish's hegemony. While the historicity of the war remains an open question, attempts have been made to assign a historical date. The suggested date is around 2600 BC, since archaeological evidence traces the fall of Kish hegemony between ED II and ED III. The location of the battle is described as having occurred outside the walls of Uruk, situated east of the present bed of the Euphrates River.

The conflict between Uruk and Kish and the relations between Gilgamesh and Aga of Kish seem to cast light on intercity politics and on the nature of governmental institutions, the citizens' assembly, and the emergence of kingship. Some scholars regarded the tale as a reflection of the relations between Sumerians and Semitics, a potentially important but as yet obscure issue of early Mesopotamian history.

== Manuscript ==
Sumerian poems were written in left-justified lines, containing line-based organizations such as couplets or stanzas. They did not rhyme, although "comparable effects were sometimes exploited." It did not use syllabo-tonic versification (accentual versification based on regular alternation of strong stressed syllables and weak unstressed syllables), and the writing system precludes detection of rhythm, metre, rhyme, or alliteration.

In ancient Sumer, like ancient Greece and India, bards and minstrels attached to the court were moved to improvise and compose narrative poems or lays celebrating the adventures and achievements of kings and princes. Where and by whom Gilgamesh and Aga was recited remains unknown, however, there might be a relationship between the texts and the Ur-Nammu dynasty's interest in Lugalbanda and Gilgamesh.

=== Fragment concordance ===
All manuscripts are from the Old Babylonian period and from Nippur except A, of unknown origin. The differences between them are mostly orthographic and grammatical.

Gilgamesh and Aga tablets and fragments
Catalogue (Römer)	A	B	C	D	E	F	G	H	I	J	K	L	M	N	O	P
Lines	1-17; 32-49; 82-96; 111-114	1-61	1-24; 88-114	1-12; 68-82	1-12; 52-61	1-12; 73-82	1-8; 47-56	4-10; 47-57	16-66	21-42	58-66	61-144	61-66; 113-114	8-24; 34-46	76-107	49-59

=== Publication ===
The story appears in literary catalogs of the Old Babylonian period. The composition of 114 lines is reconstructed from 16 fragments, which represent 9 manuscripts. It was first published in 1935 by T. Fish, in the Bulletin of the John Rylands Library XIX, and first transliterated and translated by Samuel Noah Kramer in 1949. However the interpretation remained controversial, and there were a few grammatical corrections by Jacobsen and Adam Falkenstein in 1957 and 1966 respectively.

== Poem ==
Siege of Uruk
- Part of Mesopotamia Early Dynastic Period wars
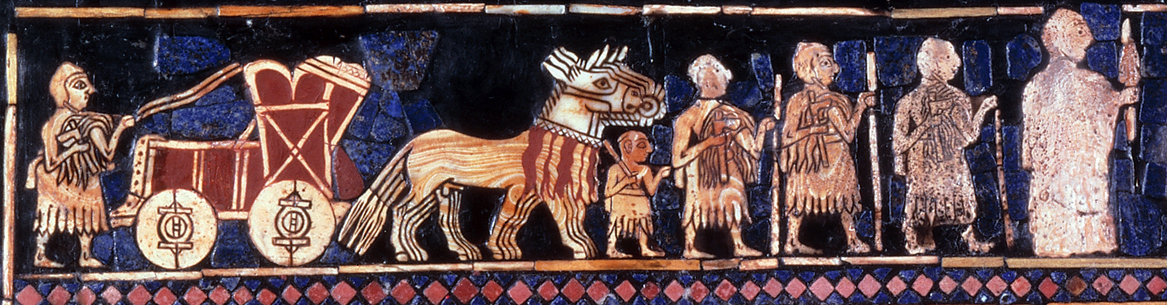
- c. 2600 BC The Standard of Ur, one of the earliest representations of a Sumerian army.
Date	c. 2600 BC
Location	Outside Uruk walls, Sumer
Result	Decisive Uruk victory: Aga set free; Ending of Kish hegemony

Belligerents
Kish	Uruk

Commanders and leaders
Aga	Gilgamesh (En and Lugal); Enkidu (servant); Birhurtura (royal guard)

Strength
Small; Scattered at the rear	Unknown number Able-bodied men

Casualties and losses
Didn't fight None	None

Aga of Kish sends messengers to lord Gilgamesh in Uruk, demanding that the city's inhabitants work as slaves digging wells for Kish. Gilgamesh suggests rebelling against Aga, but the "City fathers" reject this proposition and advise him to submit before Kish. Gilgamesh, not satisfied with the answer, repeats the message and his suggestion to rebel. They accept the uprising against Aga and appoint Gilgamesh as Lugal.

After ten days, Aga leads his army to Uruk and they surround the walls of Uruk. Its citizens are confused and intimidated. Gilgamesh asks for a volunteer to stand before Aga, and his royal guard Birhurtura offers himself. When Birhurtura comes out of the city gates, he is captured and brought before Aga himself, who interrogates and tortures him. Aga asks Birhurtura if he (Aga) is his king. Birhurtura denies this, replying that when his true king appears, Aga's army will be fought and he will be captured. This angers Aga, who continues to torture him. Then Gilgamesh steps onto the wall; his divine radiance does not frighten Aga but is beheld by the Kishite army. Enkidu and the able-bodied men take advantage of the confusion of their enemies and advance through them.

Slave, is that man your king?
That man is indeed my king!

— Aga and Enkidu. Gilgamesh and Aga lines 90-91

Aga is captured in the midst of his army. Gilgamesh addresses Aga as his superior, remembering how Aga saved his life and gave him refuge. Aga withdraws his demand and begs his favor to be returned. Gilgamesh, before Utu, sets Aga free to return to Kish.

=== Structure and style ===
The poem is divided into two segments. The first describes the activities of political institutions within the city of Uruk leading up the events that named Gilgamesh Lugal, while the second describes the military relations between the cities, or Gilgamesh and Aga. Parallelism, common in Sumerian Literature, is present; such as the message and response of Aga and the able-bodied men respectively, or Birhurtura's dialogue with Gilgamesh's actions on the battle.

There are no mythological implications or gods, as seen in the other Gilgamesh stories, and the material of the plot seems to be taken from the reality of foreign relations between Sumerian cities. The characters are ordinary human beings. Gilgamesh shares importance with Aga, who is superior to Gilgamesh, and his soldier Birhurtura, who is militarily inferior to the king although having one-fourth of the composition devoted to his contribution to the Uruk victory. Enkidu charges against the enemy troops while Gilgamesh stands on the wall, and this portrayal as a current human being, unlike his other tales, creates the impression of authenticity.

=== Historicity and dating ===
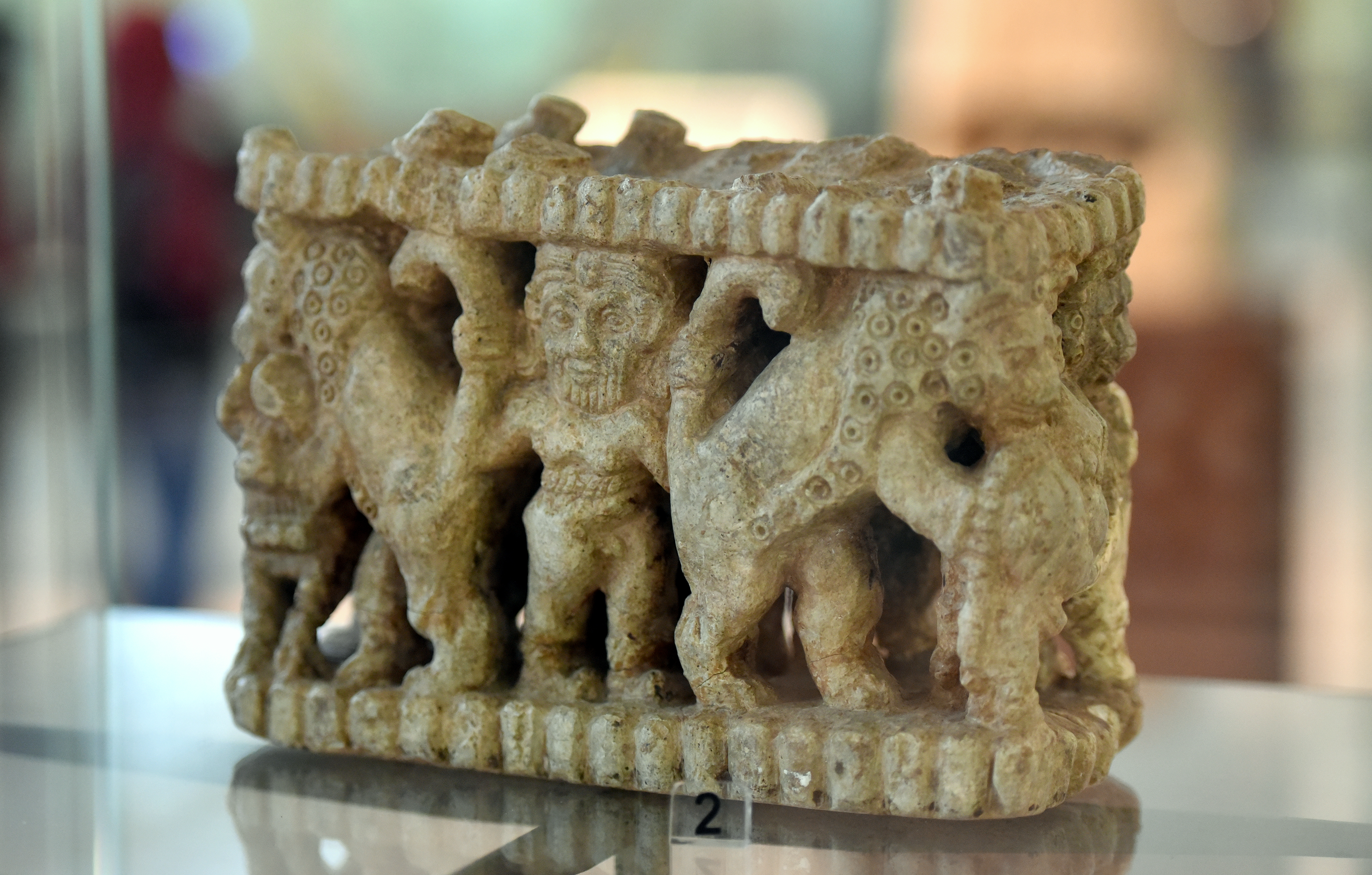
Gilgamesh in a sculptured vase, Shara Temple, Tell Agrab, Iraq

According to the Sumerian King List (ETCSL 2.1.1), Kish had hegemony over Sumer, where Aga reigned 625 years, succeeding his father Enmebaragesi to the throne, finally defeated by Uruk. The use of the royal title King of Kish expresses a claim of national rulership and prestige, since Kish once did rule the entire nation. His reign probably took over Umma, and consequently Zabala, which was a dependant of it in the Early Dynastic Period; this can be supported by his appearance the Gem of King Aga, where he is mentioned as the king of Umma. There is some scant evidence to suggest that, like the later Ur III kings, the rulers of ED Kish sought to ingratiate themselves to the authorities in Nippur, possibly to legitimize a claim for leadership over the land of Sumer or at least part of it. Archeological evidence from Kish shows a city flourishing in ED II with its political influence extending beyond the territory, however in ED III the palace was deserted, and the city declined rapidly.

=== Aga's message ===
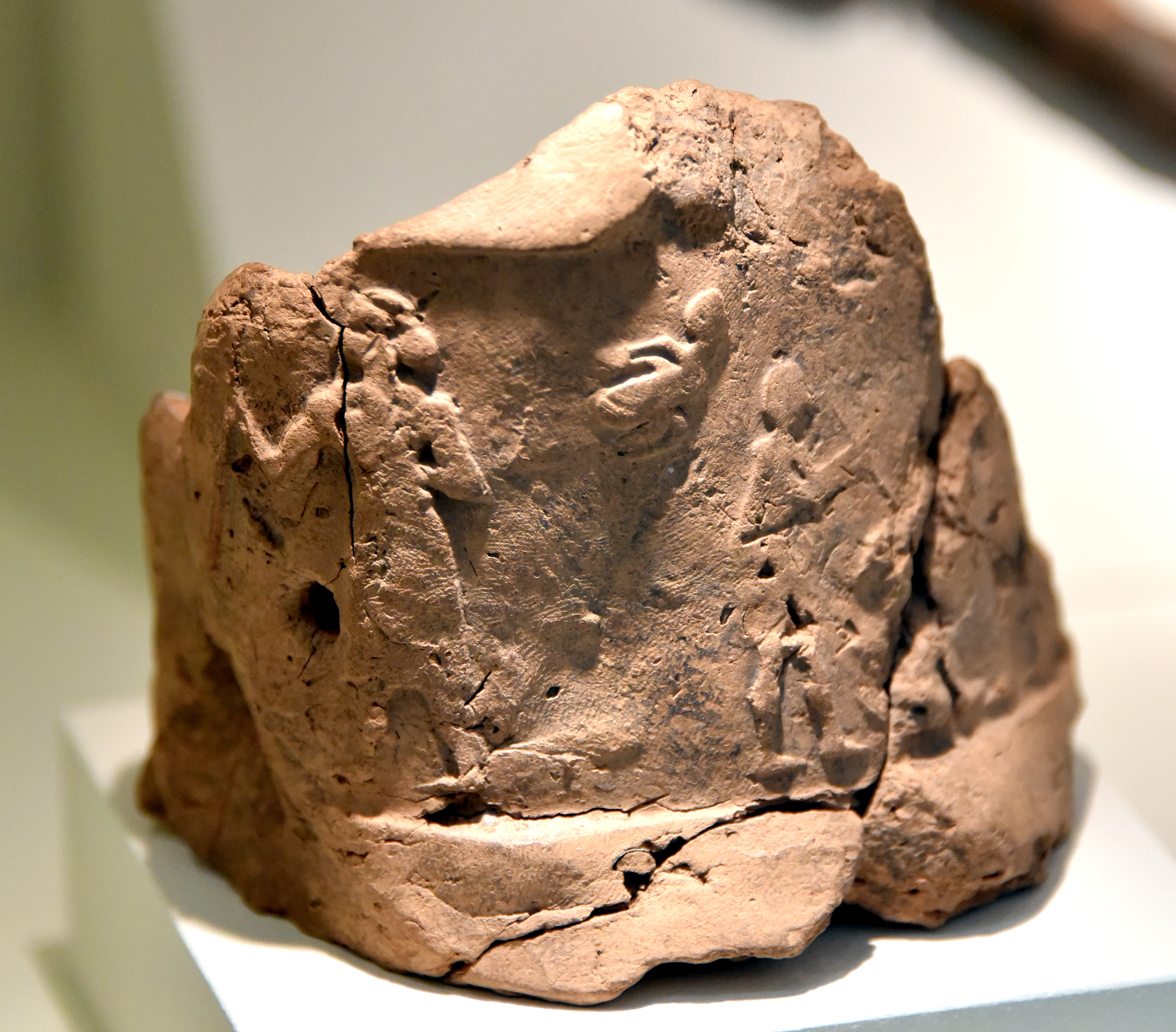
Rulers and prisoners from Uruk, Iraq. 4th millennium BCE. Pergamon Museum

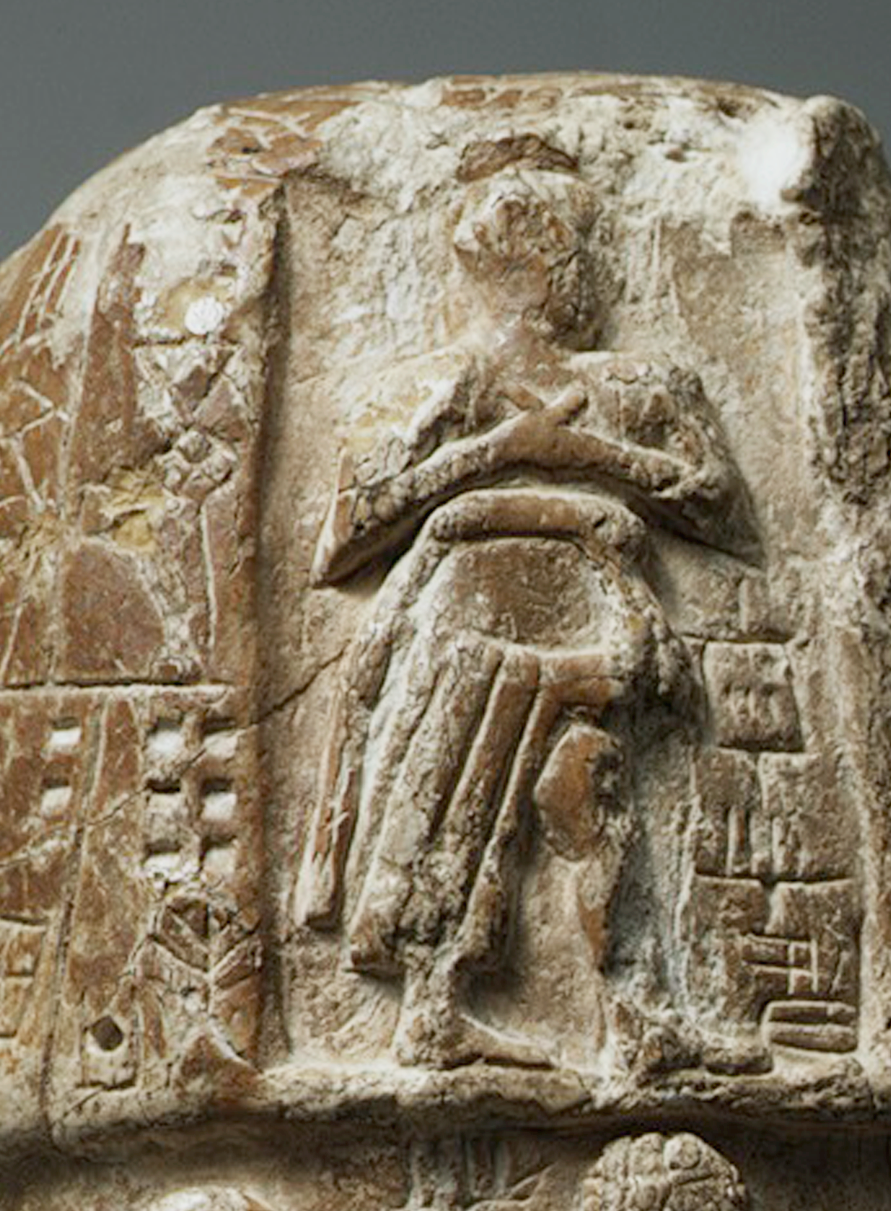
Aga depicted on the Stele of Ushumgal as official of the Great Assembly

Aga's demand meant the people of Uruk becoming drawers of water unendingly, denoting slavery. Gilgamesh repeats it before the assembly of the elders. The poem does not make clear whether Gilgamesh reproduces Aga's message or whether it is deliberately described; however, Line 4 speaks for the fact that Gilgamesh interprets the message as he was "carefully choosing his words". Only the able-bodied men, those who would have to work themselves, revolt. The rebellion is mitigated by the fact that they were not talking about the king, but about the 'son of the king'; perhaps a hint that Aga is still young and immature.

Irrigation was pivotal to life in southern Mesopotamia. Agriculture depended upon artificial irrigation and drainage, and the canals served for transportation. A vivid example of the importance of canals is found in the Stele of Vultures, erected by Eannatum of Lagash to commemorate a success in the long conflict between his city and its neighbor Umma. The conflict revolved around the control of Gu-Edin, a field on the common border between the two cities. After describing the hostilities and his victory, Eannatum relates in detail the oath taken by the king of Umma, which concerns the irrigation system.

I shall not shift its irrigation canals and channels.

— Eannatum of Lagash. Stele of Vultures Obverse

The object of Aga's demand is related to the very reality of existence in southern Mesopotamia and his demand for Uruk implies that he required foreign labor to carry it out. Pre-Sargonic Lagash texts show that mass killings of war prisoners and recruiting foreign forces to strengthen the city were not unknown. The same motif can be seen in Enmerkar and the Lord of Aratta (ETCSL), where Enmerkar demanded that the people of Aratta do construction work.

Aga's demand was found in a proverb collection, making the answer of the able-bodied men functionally parallel, since both are made from the literally same model. Both answers begin with a strophe demonstrating authority, to make demands and conclude with a decision concerning the war.

Speech using proverbs
Agga's threat	Able-bodied men response
There are wells to be finished, Many wells of the land yet to be completed; There are narrow wells on the land to be finished, There are wells to deepen and ropes to be completed.	Standing on duty, Sitting in attendance, Escorting the king's son, Holding the bridle of the donkey. Who has that much breath?

=== The assembly ===
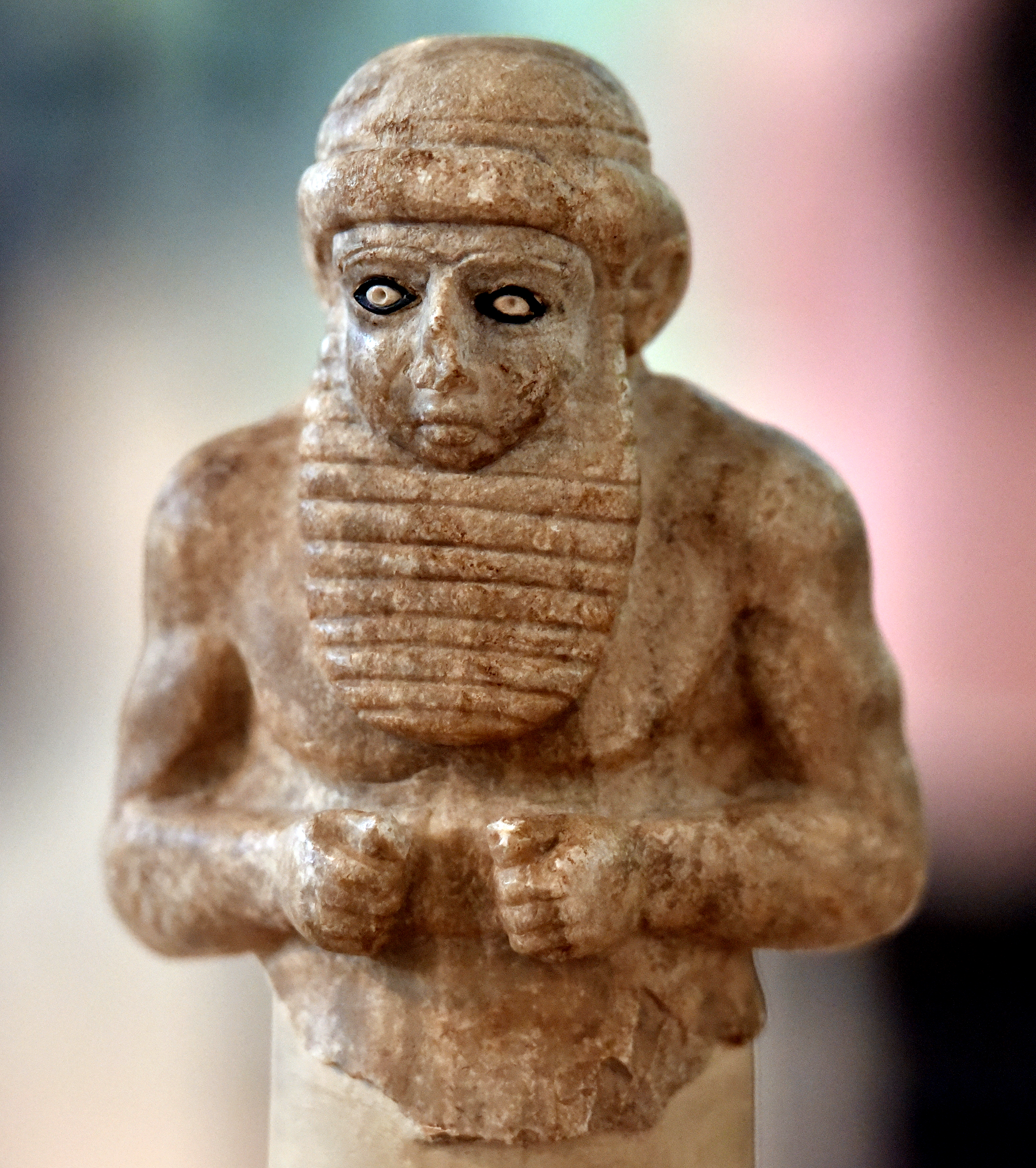
Priest-king from Uruk, Mesopotamia, Iraq, c. 3000 BCE. The Iraq Museum

While assemblies existed, there's no record of their composition or function until the Early Dynastic Period III.^{a} According to Old Babylonian texts, the king had full political authority. There were political organizations in Akkadian terms, such as puhrum (assembly), alum (city) and šibutum (elders). Jacobsen, who used mythological texts for extracting historical information, used the Enuma Elish which relates how the assembly of gods decided to face Tiamat.

- A meeting of the assembly is called by the head of the pantheon.
- The assembly nominates one of their members as Lugal, with the pronunciation of a formula.
- The office is granted for a limited time.

Jacobsen maintained that Enuma Elish was a reflect of pre-historic politics, and gave it the term of "primitive democracy" implying that the citizens' assembly administered all affairs of the community, and this assembly was authorized to appoint a leader for a definitive mission for a limited time. He assumed that the later political institutions of the Sumerian city-states developed from the leadership patterns of small proto-urban communities. To explain the disagreement between the City fathers and the Able-bodied men about attacking Kish, Jacobsen suggests that the power of the assembly was waning and it only had the power to elect a leader in case of rebellion. Another theory based on the pre-Sargonic Lagash texts, suggested that the City fathers represented the estate-owning nobility while the able-bodied men were the members of the community, who cultivated small family plots, and both organizations shared power with the king on issues of temples, irrigation, and construction. However, this theory is not applicable to the time of Gilgamesh and Aga.

Kramer theorized the existence of a bicameral political structure, however the poem, rather than being historically accurate, creates an antithetical parallel^{b} taken for reality, elders and the assembly were two separated political entities (contradicting the poem's story) while the able-bodied men were an element of the city's population working for the military. According to Dina Katz, the able-bodied men were the starting point for the parallelism.

The narrator seems to have created ukkin-ga-ra-ab-ba-uru-na-ke4 to harmonize antithetically with ukkin-gar-ra-guruš-na-ka (the convoked assembly of the city's able-bodied men)

— Dina Katz. Gilgamesh and Akka page 25

Since the able-bodied men were military units whose decisions on public matters had no authority, the author created the Assembly of able-bodied men an antithesis to the Assembly of City fathers, giving both a legal repercussion.

=== The battle ===
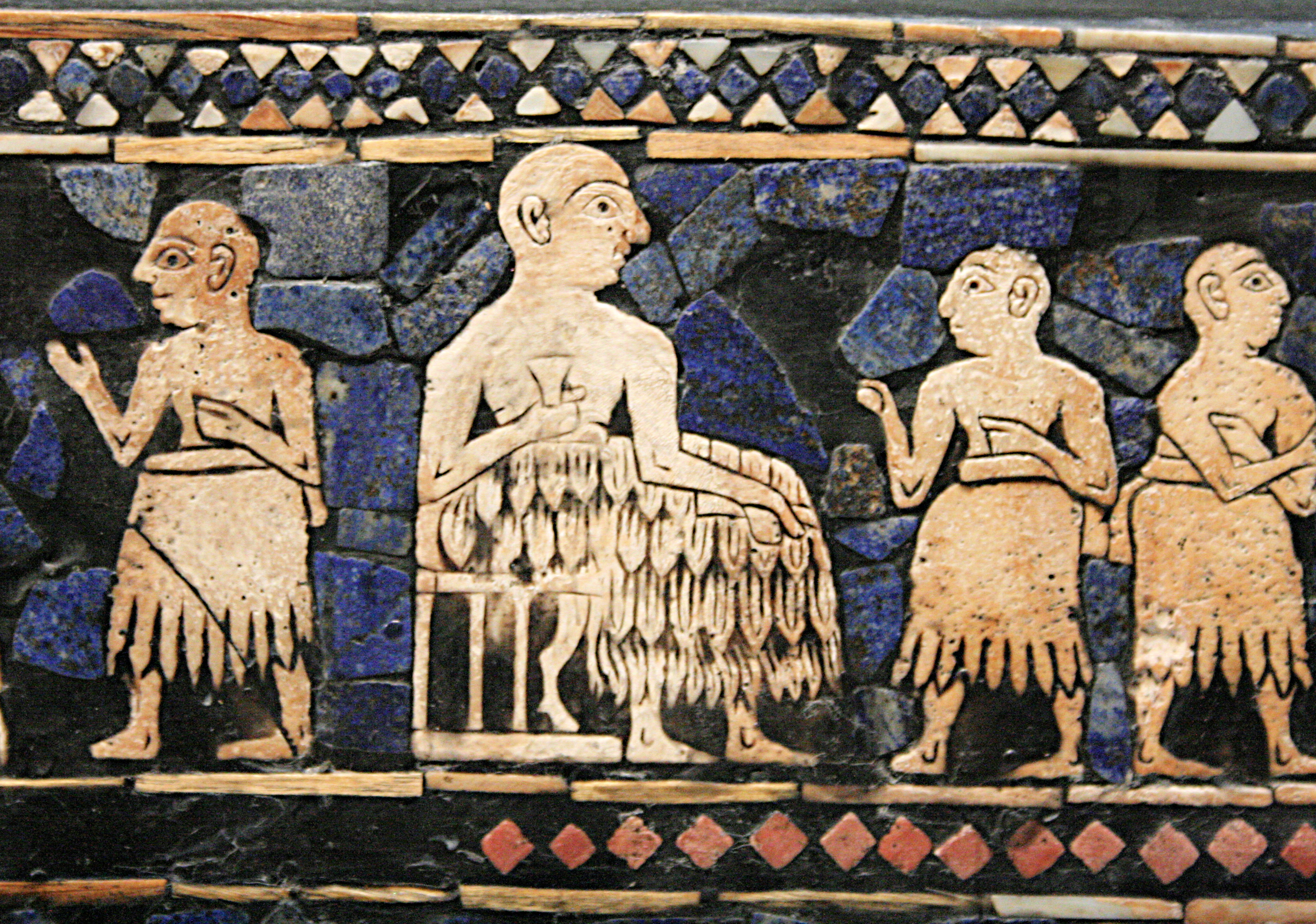
Enthroned King of Ur

Birhurture was sent out in response to the confusion of the people of Uruk when Aga's army appeared, as the army's trust and loyalty to Gilgamesh were at stake. In front of Aga, Birhurtura describes in detail how his army will break. These words are not to demoralize the enemy, but to encourage the Urukeans. And when finally Gilgamesh leans on the wall, his appearance does not affect Aga's army but the people of Uruk, the young (able-bodied men) and the old ("City fathers").

Gilgamesh climbed up on the rampart after the officer of Uruk.
His radiance overwhelmed Kulaba's young and old.

It may be that the inquiries at the various assemblies described in the beginning should emphasize that the good ruler should not only listen to influential people but should also take care of the concerns of ordinary people. Gilgamesh is contrasted with the unjust Aga as the ideal ruler.

Birhurtura's words seem to describe his awe rather than the fearfulness of Gilgamesh's appearance, however, there is no strict distinction between fear and awe in Sumerian and Akkadian (me-lam2). Aga does not identify Gilgamesh from his soldier and has to ask Birhurtura, the me-lam of Gilgamesh apparently does not affect him. When Gilgamesh steps on the wall, Aga is not physically overwhelmed by his sight, but his army collapses the moment Birhurtura declares he is his king. The recognition of his subjects gives a king all power, even over his enemies. It is what Gilgamesh has and what Aga has missed with his demand and is now trying in vain to get back. The poem does not emphasize the details of the battle, as it is unimportant. But it is the spirit of the warriors which gives Gilgamesh the victory. While the army of Gilgamesh follows him, the army of the unjust Aga does not fight, as he was "taken in the middle of his army".

In the denouement Gilgamesh addresses Aga as his superior, recalling how Aga had once given him safe refuge. Aga asks Gilgamesh to repay his favour and Gilgamesh accordingly lets him go free to Kish.

According to Jacobsen, Gilgamesh was appointed in Uruk as a vassal by his king Aga, then, moved by an heroic pride, instigated a rebellion. Gilgamesh manipulates Aga on acknowledging the relief of Uruk from Kish and the end of its supremacy. The freedom to return was a repayment for Aga's favors in the past. This interpretation matches with the insurgence of Gilgamesh power, both from lord to king, and on the personal level with Aga, from a vassal to an independent king.

== See also ==
- History of Sumer
- Agag

== Notes ==
a. The information contained in the early third millennium texts is in its present state of elaboration not yet usable for the reconstruction of the political system.
b. A recurrent motif used on the Ancient Near East literature.
