= Divine Council =

Assembly of deities over which a higher-level God presides

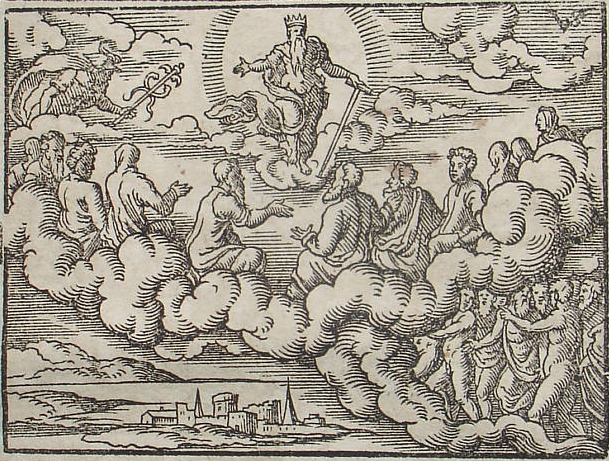
Council of gods before the Deluge. Engraving by Virgil Solis for Ovid's Metamorphoses Book I, 162–208. Fol. 4v, image 7.

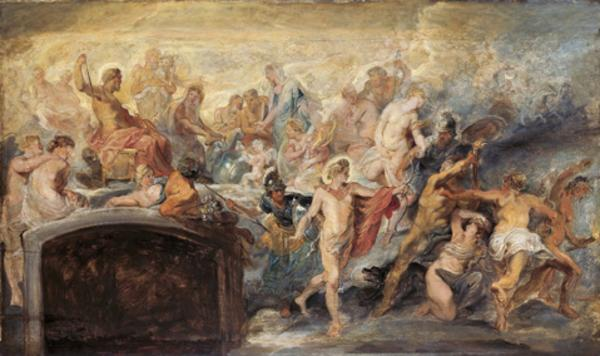
The Council of Gods (Sketch for the Medici Cycle) No.14, Peter Paul Rubens (1577–1640), Alte Pinakothek

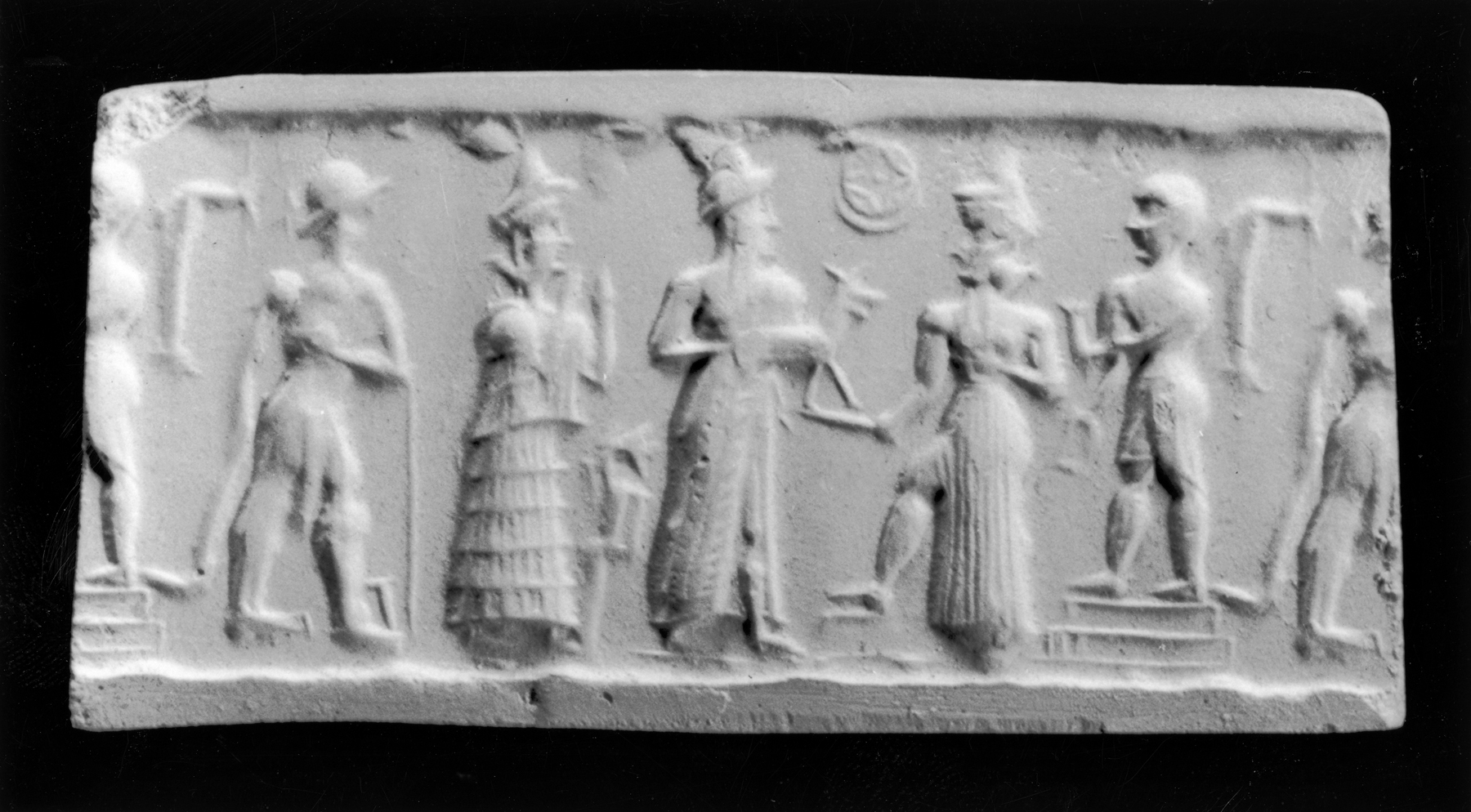
This seal depicts a favorite scene of the Old Babylonian period in which a worshiper stands among a number of gods. The worshiper, in a long robe and cap, offers an animal to the sun-god Shamash, who rests one foot on a stool and holds the saw of justice in his outstretched hand. The sun disk, nestled in a crescent, floats between the two. The goddess Lama stands with her hands raised in supplication. Behind her, a male figure in a kilt holds a curving weapon at his side, and another figure behind Shamash holds the bucket and "sprinkler" associated with fertility.

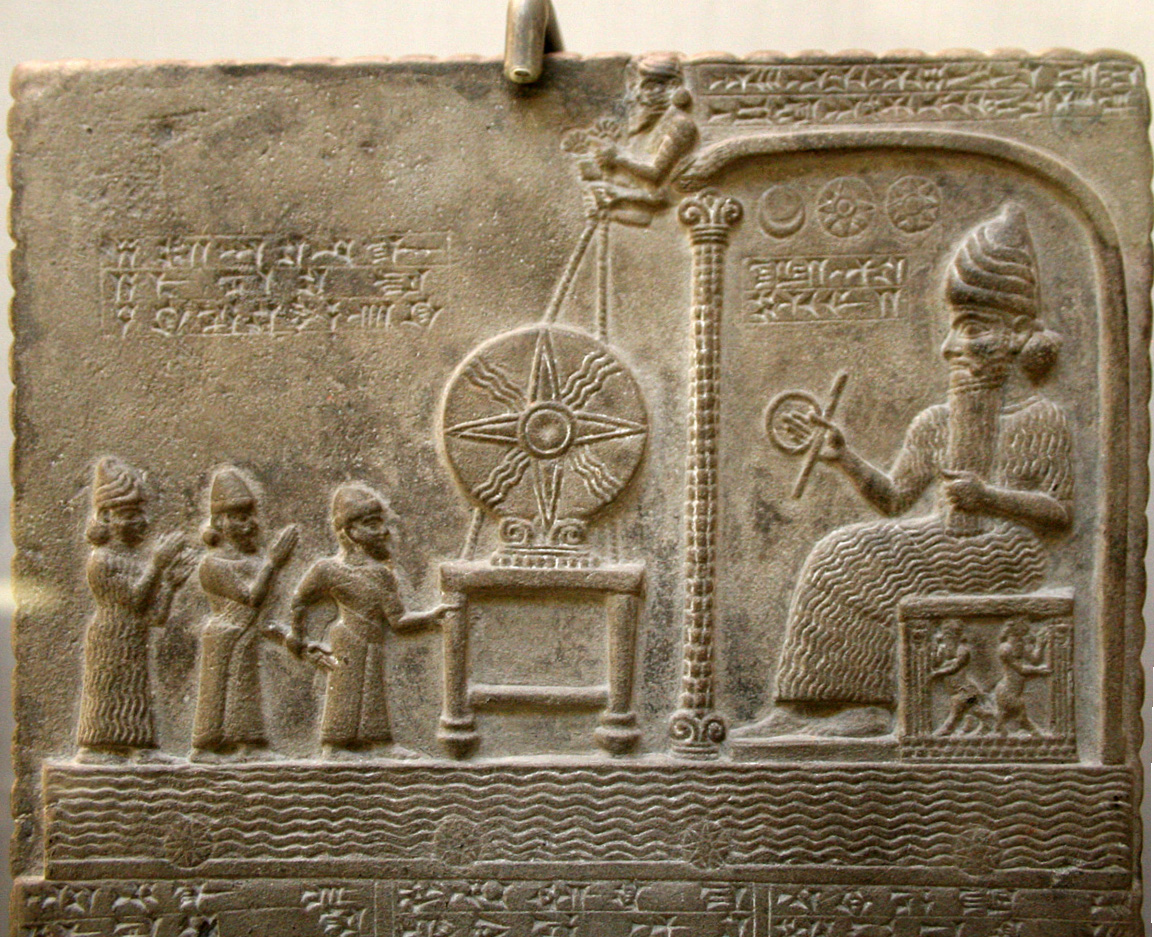
A meeting of gods on the Tablet of Shamash, British Library room 55. Found in Sippar (Tell Abu Habbah), in Ancient Babylonia; it dates from the 9th century BC and shows the sun god Shamash on the throne, in front of the Babylonian king Nabu-apla-iddina (888–855 BC) between two interceding deities. The text tells how the king made a new cultic statue for the god and gave privileges to his temple.

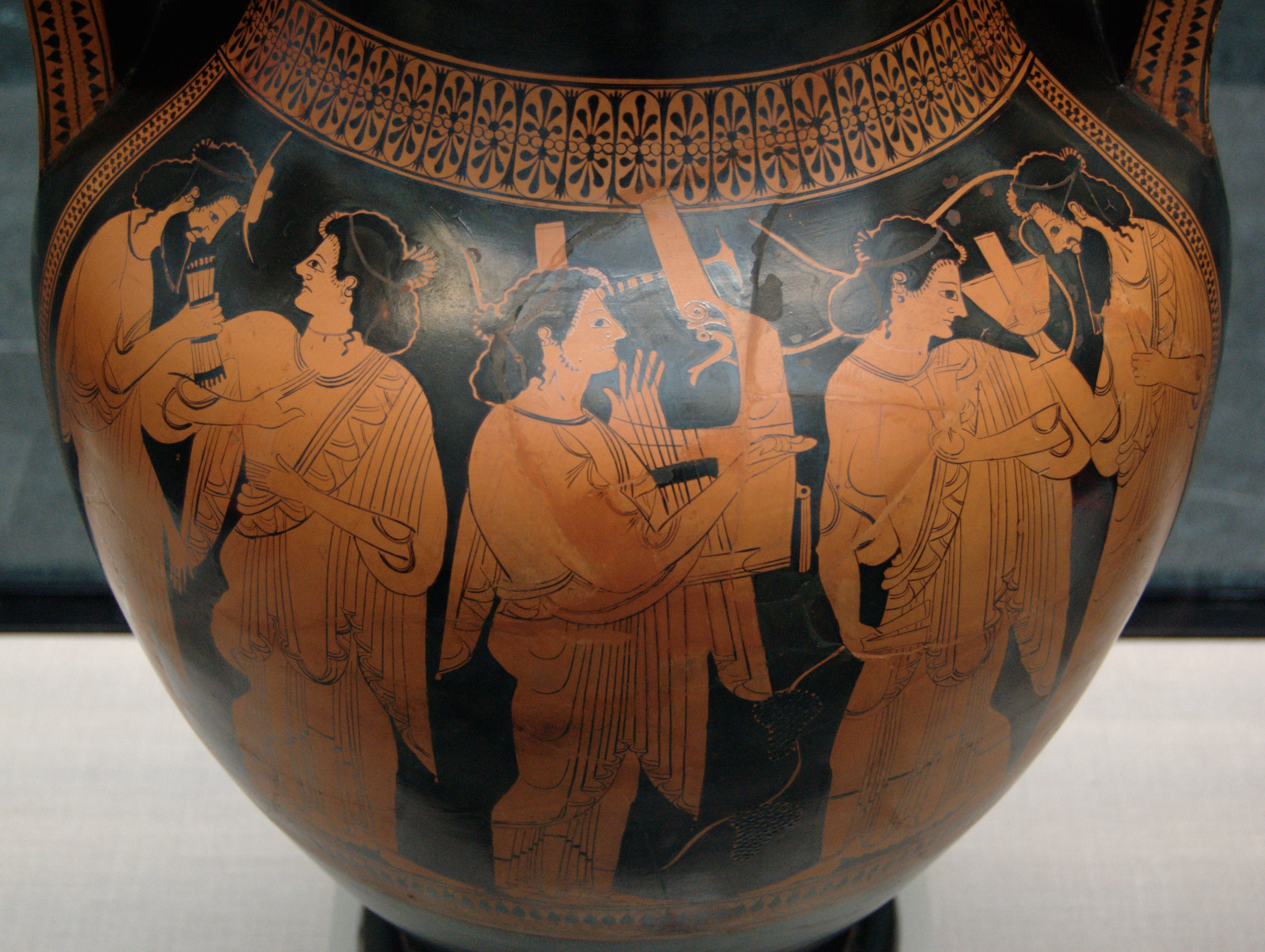
Divine council in Olympus: Hermes with his mother Maia, Apollo playing kithara, Dionysos and a maenad. Side B of an Attic red-figure belly-amphora, ca. 500 BC.

A Divine Council is an assembly of a number of deities over which a higher-level one presides.

== Historical setting ==
The concept of a divine assembly (or council) is attested in the archaic Sumerian, Akkadian, Old Babylonian, Ancient Egyptian, Babylonian, Canaanite, Israelite, Celtic, Ancient Greek and Ancient Roman and Nordic pantheons. Ancient Egyptian literature reveals the existence of a "synod of the gods". Some of our most complete descriptions of the activities of the divine assembly are found in the literature from Mesopotamia. Their assembly of the gods, headed by the high god Anu, would meet to address various concerns. The term used in Sumerian to describe this concept was Ukkin, and in later Akkadian and Aramaic was puhru.

== Examples ==
=== Archaic Sumerian ===
One of the first records of a divine council appears in the Lament for Ur, where the pantheon of Annunaki is led by An with Ninhursag and Enlil also appearing as prominent members.

=== Akkadian ===
The divine council is led by Anu, Enlil, and Ninlil.

=== Old Babylonian ===
In the Old Babylonian pantheon, Samas (or Shamash) and Adad chair the meetings of the divine council.

=== Ancient Egyptian ===
The leader of the Ancient Egyptian pantheon is considered to either be Thoth or Ra, who were known to hold meetings at Heliopolis (On).

=== Babylonian ===
Marduk appears in the Babylonian Enûma Eliš as presiding over a divine council, deciding fates and dispensing divine justice.

=== Canaanite ===
Texts from Ugarit give a detailed description of the Divine Council, in which El and Ba'al are the presiding gods.

=== Hebrew/Israelite ===
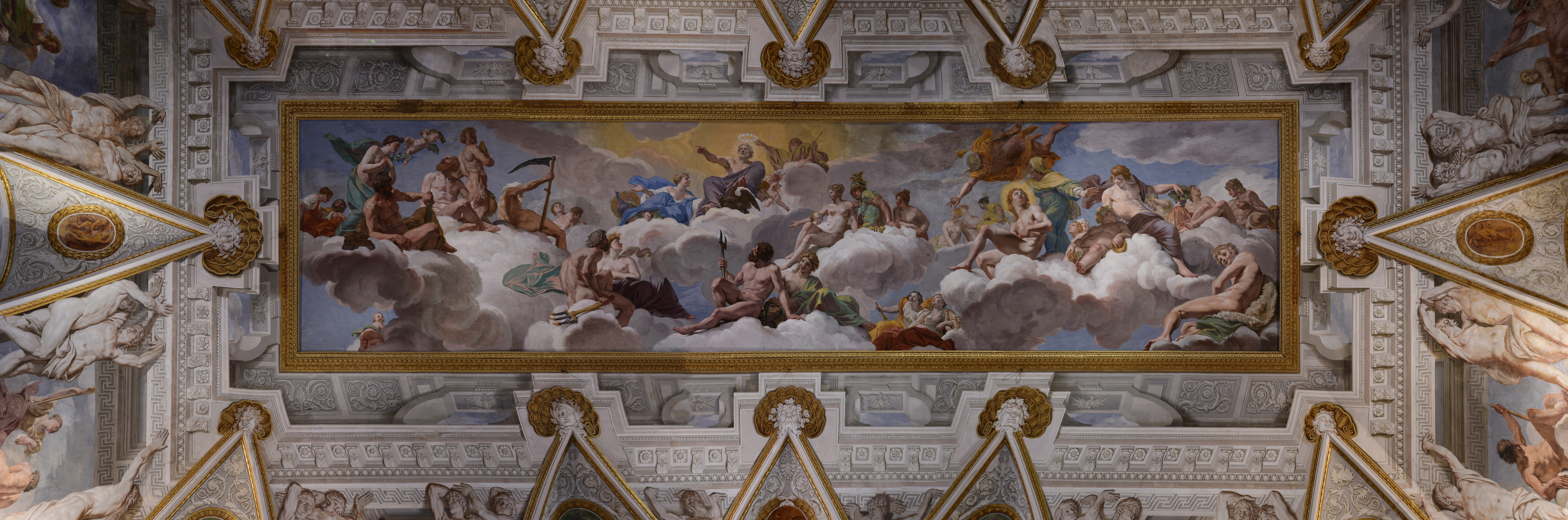
The Council of Gods, Giovanni Lanfranco (1582–1647), Galleria Borghese

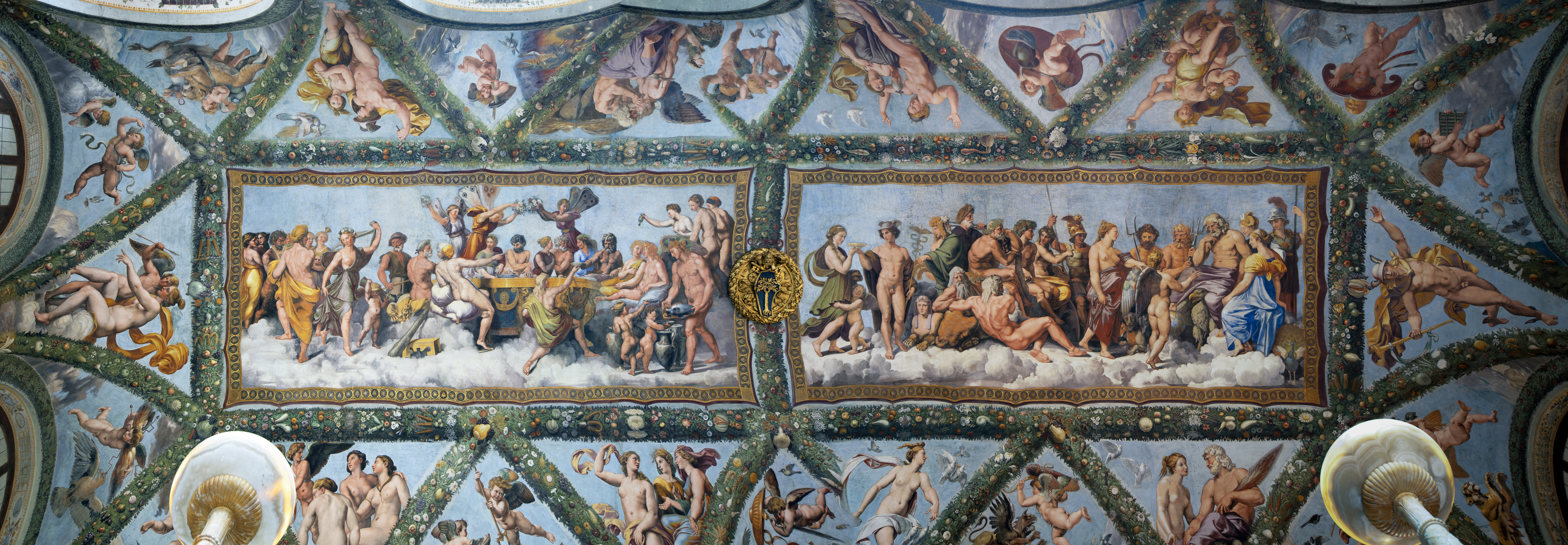
Loggia di Psiche, ceiling fresco by Raffael and his school (The Council of The Gods), Villa Farnesina, Rome, Italy, by Alexander Z., 2006-01-02

In the Hebrew Bible, there are multiple descriptions of Yahweh presiding over a great assembly of spiritual beings. Some interpret these assemblies as examples of a Divine Council:

The Old Testament descriptions of the "divine assembly" all suggest that this metaphor for the organization of the divine world was consistent with that of Mesopotamia and Canaan. One difference, however, should be noted. In the Old Testament, the identities of the members of the assembly are far more obscure than those found in other descriptions of these groups, as in their polytheistic environment. Israelite writers sought to express both the uniqueness and the superiority of their God Yahweh.

The Revised JPS Edition of Psalm 82 translation reads: "God (Biblical Hebrew: אֱלֹהִ֔ים, romanized: Elohim) stands in the divine assembly (בַּעֲדַת-אֵל, ‘ăḏaṯ-’êl), pronouncing judgment among the divine beings (אֱלֹהִ֔ים, elohim)" (אֱלֹהִים נִצָּב בַּעֲדַת־אֵל בְּקֶרֶב אֱלֹהִים יִשְׁפֹּט). The meaning of the two occurrences of "elohim" has been debated by scholars, with some suggesting both words refer to Yahweh, while others propose that the God of Israel rules over a divine assembly of other gods or angels. Some English translations of Psalm 82:1 render the verse as, "God (Elohim) stands in the congregation of the mighty to judge the heart as God (elohim)", which avoids reference to a divine council altogether. Later, in Psalm 82:6, the word for "gods" (elokim) is again used (per the Christian King James Version): "I have said, Ye [are] gods; and all of you [are] children of the most High." Instead of "gods", the 1917 Jewish Publication Society of America Version uses "godlike beings". Still, the Biblical Hebrew term is elohim (Strong's H430). Psalm 82 is quoted in the Christian New Testament in John 10:34.

Additional examples are in 1 Kings and the Book of Job. In 1 Kings 22:19, the prophet Micaiah has a vision of Yahweh seated among "the whole host of heaven" standing on his right and on his left. He asks who will entice Ahab, and a spirit volunteers. The first two chapters of the Book of Job describe the "Sons of God" assembling in the presence of Yahweh. Both of these assemblies have been interpreted as another example of a divine council.

Writes Christian theologian David N. Freedman for the Anchor Bible Dictionary:

The role of the divine assembly as a conceptual part of the background of Hebrew prophecy is clearly displayed in two descriptions of prophetic involvement in the heavenly council. In 1 Kings 22:19–23... Micaiah is allowed to see God (Elohim) in action in the heavenly decision regarding the fate of Ahab. Isaiah 6 depicts a situation in which the prophet himself takes on the role of the messenger of the assembly and the message of the prophet is thus commissioned by Yahweh. The depiction here illustrates this important aspect of the conceptual background of prophetic authority.

Michael S. Heiser has argued that even if some of these beings are understood to be "gods," that does not mean that the biblical writers were saying that Yahweh is not unique; rather, Heiser understands Yahweh to be the only creator God whereas the other gods are subordinate created beings.

=== Chinese ===
In Chinese theology, the deities under the Jade Emperor were sometimes referred to as the celestial bureaucracy because they were portrayed as organized like an earthly government.

=== Celtic ===
In Celtic mythology, most deities are considered members of the same family: the Tuatha Dé Danann. Family members include the Goddesses Danu, Brigid, Airmid, The Morrígan, and others. Gods in the family include Ogma, the Dagda, Lugh and Goibniu, again, among many others. The Celts honoured many tribal and tutelary deities, along with spirits of nature and ancestral spirits. Sometimes a deity was seen as the ancestor of a clan and family line. Leadership of the family changed over time, depending on the situation. The Celtic deities do not fit most Classical ideas of a "Divine Council" or pantheon.

=== Ancient Greek ===
Zeus and Hera preside over the divine council in Greek mythology. The council assists Odysseus in Homer's Odyssey.

=== Ancient Roman ===
Jupiter presides over the Roman pantheon who prescribe punishment on Lycaon in Ovid's Metamorphoses, as well as punishing Argos and Thebes in Thebaid by Statius.

=== Norse ===
There are mentions in Gautreks saga and in the euhemerized work of Saxo Grammaticus of the Norse gods meeting in council. The gods sitting in council in their judgment seats or "thrones of fate" is one of the refrains in the Eddic poem "Völuspá"; a "thing" of the gods is also mentioned in "Baldrs draumar", "Þrymskviða" and the skaldic "Haustlöng", in those poems always in the context of some calamity. Snorri Sturluson, in his Prose Edda, referred to a daily council of the gods at Urð's well, citing a verse from "Grímnismál" about Thor being forced through rivers to reach it. However, although the word regin usually refers to the gods, in some occurrences of reginþing it may be simply an intensifier meaning "great", as it is in modern Icelandic, rather than indicating a meeting of the divine council.

=== The Church of Jesus Christ of Latter-day Saints ===
"The Council in Heaven" is central to the premortal life in the Church of Jesus Christ of Latter-day Saints. Latter-day Saints believe that in the premortal life, Heavenly Father explained to His children what life on earth would be like. He taught that individuals would receive agency and be able to choose between good and evil. He also taught of birth, death, judgement, and resurrection. The plan included the role of Jesus Christ in atoning for the sins of the world and being resurrected so that people would be able to repent and return unto God. Lucifer (Satan) rebelled against the plan and wanted to eliminate agency so that "one soul shall not be lost". He wanted power and glory for himself and as a result he and his followers were cast out of Heaven.

== See also ==
- Pantheon (religion)
- Rephaim
- Sons of God
- Heavenly host
- War in Heaven
- Deir Alla inscription
- Archon (Gnosticism)
