= Tummal =

Tummal (Tum-ma-al^{ki} or Tum-al^{ki}) was an ancient Near East cult site of the goddess Ninlil, as Egi-Tummal (Lady of Tummal), currently unlocated but known to be in the vicinity of Nippur and Drehem. E-Tummal (House of Tummal) (also E-kiur) was the temple to Ninlil located there. Texts from Drehem indicate that monthly lustrations, with animal offerings, for the goddess Nintinugga were being conducted at the temple of Ninlil in Tummal.

== History ==
Though it is known to have existed in the Akkadian Empire period, most of the records mentioning Tummal come from the Ur III period when it was site of the sacred marriage between Enlil and Ninlil. During the reign of Ur III ruler Shulgi, especially in years 35-37, large amount of construction occurred at Tummal, including of a royal palace and administrative buildings. The palace included funerary chapels for Ur-Nammu (e Tum-ma-al Ur-^{d}Namma) and his wife. Building materials came from as far away as Babylon, Kutha, and Adab. The ki-a-nag, or funerary offerings for Ur III ruler Ur-Nammu were carried out at Tummal. As his grave was not found in Ur this has sparked speculation he was buried in Tummal. In one Ur III text it was reported that workers from Umma performed "24,500 man-days, 67 full time years" of labor at Tummal. During the time of Amar-Sin and Shu-Sin a royal daughter, Seleppütum (A daughter of Amar-Sin or perhaps Shulgi) resided at Tummal.

== Location ==
In the early days of archaeology it was believed that Tummal was merely the name of a sacred quarter in Nippur dedicated to Ninlil, it later became clear that Tummal was a city in its own right, though nothing prevents there from being such a named area in Nippur. Current thinking, yet unconfirmed, places it at the site of Dlehim.

In Mesopotamia it was typical for gods (their cult statues) to go on "divine journeys" visiting their cult sites and being "greeted" by other gods along the way. It is known from itineraries of the divine journeys of the god Nanna-Suen that Tummal lay between Nippur and Shuruppak, 55 kilometers to the south, both cities on the Euphrates River.

== Tummal Inscription ==
The Tummal Inscription, also known as the "History of the Tummal of Ninlil at Nippur", is sometimes considered one of the Babylonian Chronicles. Sixteen slightly differing copies have been found, 12 at Nippur, 3 at Ur, and 1 of unknown provenance. It was written in the time of the Ishbi-Erra (c. 2017—1986 BC), initial ruler of the Dynasty of Isin. The writing lists the names of the rulers that built the temples dedicated to Enlil within Nippur and temples of Ninlil in Tummal, amongst whom were the king of Kish, Enmebaragesi and his heir Aga of Kish.

"En-me-barage-si,
The king in this very city (that is Nippur),
built the House of Enlil,
Agga the son of En-me-barage-si,
made the Tummal pre-eminent.
Then the Tummal fell into ruins for the first time.
Meš-ane-pada built the Bur-šušua in Enlil's temple.
Meš-ki-aĝ-Nuna, son of Meš-ane-pada,
made the Tummal flourish,
and brought Ninlil into the Tummal.
Then the Tummal fell into ruins for a second time.
Bilgames built the Numunbura in Enlil's shrine.
Ur-lugal, son of Bilgames,
made the Tummal flourish,
and brought Ninlil into the Tummal.
Then the Tummal fell into ruins for a third time.
Nanni built the Lofty Garden in Enlil's temple.
Meš-ki-aĝ-Nanna, son of Nanni,
made the Tummal flourish,
and brought Ninlil into the Tummal.
Then the Tummal fell into ruins for a fourth time.
Ur-Namma, built the E-kur.
Šulgi, son of Ur-Namma,
made the Tummal flourish,
and brought Ninlil into the Tummal.
Then the Tummal fell into ruins for a fourth time.
From the years of Amar-Suena
of Shu-Suena,
until King Ibbi-Suen
chose En-am-gal-ana by extispicy as the high priest of inanna of Uruk,
Ninlil came regularly to the Tummal.
Written according to the words of Lu-inanna, the chief leatherworker of Enlil.
Išbi-Erra, who looks after the E-kur,
built the storehouse of Enlil."

— Old Babylonian tablet Tummal Inscription (1900-1600 BCE)

The chronicle was written by two persons from Nippur and, most likely, Ur. A number of religious analyses of the inscriptions find evidence within the text for a claim of divine intervention.

The inscription was useful in the understanding of the archaeology and history of Gilgamesh.

It has been proposed that this text was "not a historical document, but quite simply a school concoction based primarily on the SKL and on the Nippur version of the lexical list Proto-Kagal".

It is known that during the Old Babylonian period scribes visited Tummal to copy inscriptions from the bases of Akkadian ruler's statues.

== See also ==
- Cities of the ancient Near East
- Chronology of the ancient Near East
