= Enmebaragesi =

Ancient Mesopotamian king

Enmebaragesi 𒂗𒈨𒁈𒄄𒋛
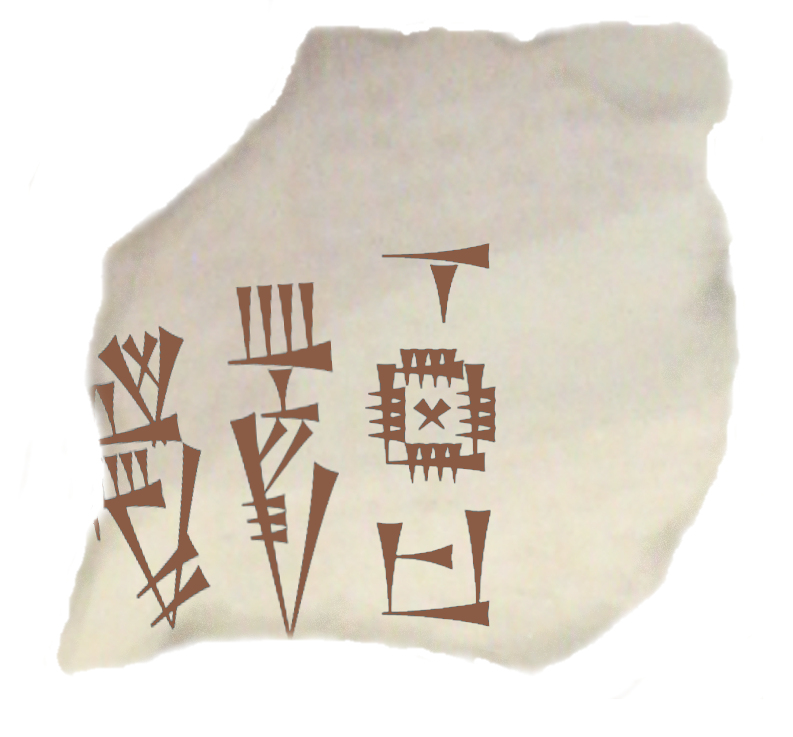
- Alabaster vase fragment with transcription of Mebaragesi as king of Kish (illustration) 𒈨𒁈𒋛 𒈗 𒆧 me-bara2-si lugal kish "Mebarasi, King of Kish"

King of Kish
- Reign: c. 2750 BC
- Successor: Aga
- Issue: Aga
- Dynasty: Kish 1

Enmebaragesi (Sumerian: 𒂗𒈨𒁈𒄄𒋛, romanized: Enmebárgisi; fl. c. 2750 BC) originally Mebarasi (𒈨𒁈𒋛) was the penultimate king of the first dynasty of Kish and is recorded as having reigned 900 years in the Sumerian King List. Like his son and successor Aga, he reigned during a period when Kish had hegemony over Sumer. (Note: While Aga and his father Enmebaragesi had Sumerian names, the rest of the Kish dynasty had Semitic names, such as Jushur, Zuqaqip or Mashda.Katz 1993, p. 20) Enmebaragesi is the earliest ruler on the king list whose name is attested directly from archaeology.

== Name ==
The name construction of "Title A Place B-e si-Ø" (Official A who is appropriate for place B) was commonly used in the Early Dynastic onomasticon.

- EN (𒂗): Honorific title that was not part of the original name, used on kings associated with cities sacred to Inanna in the mythical historiography of Ur-Nammu's dynasty.
- ME (𒈨): Michalowski reads it as isib (priest), while Steinkeller concludes it is an abbreviated writing form of men (crown). (Note: The word men is rather uncommon in the Fara personal names, appearing only seven times. One of those names Men-pa-e2 only appears five times, while its graphic variation ME-pa-e2 is attested 37 times.Steinkeller 2015, p. 44)
- BARA2 (𒁈): According to the onomastic, it is a cultic/political place. However, if the pattern is "ME fit for Official A", it would mean "ruler".
- SI (𒋛): Verb meaning "to fill", which has more active force than the intransitive verb TUŠ (to sit, dwell), having a highly ideological meaning.

Given both options, the name can be translated as "Priest who permeates the throne" or "Crown fit for a ruler".

== Date ==
The dating of Enmebaragesi's reign and lifespan has inspired a fair amount of debate within the scholarly community, with propositions ranging from beginning Early Dynastic I (c. 2900 – c. 2800 BCE) to Early Dynastic IIIa (c. 2600 BCE). Most scholars typically attribute a date of c. 2600 BCE, citing several inscriptions that are datable to that period, while others place these inscriptions slightly earlier at c. 2700 BCE. Gianni Marchesi and Niccolò Marchetti, in their 2006 book: Royal Statuary of Early Dynastic Mesopotamia, propose that three of the four inscriptions typically attributed to Enmebaragesi refer to a non-royal personage, due to their lack of royal dedicators and the fact that they are dated later than the only known inscription referring to Enmebaragesi as king. These ideas are also reflected in the publications of the ARCANE project (Associated Regional Chronologies for the Ancient Near East), the most up-to-date evaluation of the chronology of 3rd millennium BC Mesopotamia.

== Inscriptions ==
Four inscriptions have been found with the name Mebaragesi, however, only one specifically mentions the title of king, a vessel fragment (IM 30590) of unknown provenance marked "confiscated at Kut", housed in the Baghdad Museum; 𒈨𒁈𒋛 𒈗𒆧 ("Mebarasi, King of Kish"). This inscription can be dated on palaeographic grounds to the Early Dynastic I based on the very archaic form of the sign Kish, still showing the horns of the aurochs’ heads' at the origin of the grapheme.

Another vessel fragment from Khafajah, inscribed with the name ME-barag-[si] is usually also attributed to the king of Kish. However, the dating of the piece is from the ED IIIa, and the Bara2 (𒁈) of the inscription is of a different shape than that of the inscription in the Baghdad Museum, which might suggest it is referring to another Mebaragesi who was not king. He is also attested in the Sumerian King List and in the Tummal Inscription, both as the father of Aga of Kish and the first builder of the temple:

Enmebaragesi,
the king in this very city (Nippur),
built the House of Enlil,
Agga the son of Enmebaragesi,
made the Tummal pre-eminent.

— Old Babylonian tablet Tummal Inscription (1900-1600 BCE)

Enmebaragesi is also mentioned Gilgamesh and Aga as the father of Aga who laid siege to Uruk. In The Lord to the Living One's Mountain Gilgamesh's sister, who is offered to the monster Huwawa, is named Enmebaragesi .

== Reign ==
According to the Sumerian King List, Kish had the hegemony over the entire territory of northern Babylonia and the most northern section of southern Babylonia cities such as Nippur, Isin, and Eresh, and large portions of the Diyala Region. He succeeded Iltasadum on the throne, where he reigned 900 years, leading a successful campaign against Elam and capturing Dumuzid the Fisherman in Uruk. There is some scant evidence to suggest that like the later Ur III kings, the rulers of Early Dynastic Kish sought to ingratiate themselves to the authorities in Nippur, possibly to legitimize a claim for leadership over the land of Sumer or at least part of it. The use of the royal title King of Kish expressing a claim of national rulership owes its prestige to the fact that Kish once did rule the entire nation. Archaeological evidence from Kish shows a city flourishing in ED II with its political influence extending beyond the territory, however in ED III the city declined rapidly.

=== Elamite campaign ===
The Sumerian King List recounts "En-me(n)-barage-si, the one who carried away as he spoiled the weapons of the land of Elam, became king." A tradition of the Kishite expansion into the Susiana and Iranian plateau is reflected in an inscription of an ED II king of Kish named Enna-il, which commemorates his military operations in Elam. The inscriptions of Enmebaragesi discovered at Khafajah, and an unidentified king of Kish at Tell Agrab, are convincing indicators of the Kišite presence in the Diyala Region.

=== Invasion of Uruk and its ambiguity in interpretation ===
One version of the Sumerian King List was previously interpreted as stating that King Dumuzid the Fisherman of Uruk captured Enmebaragesi, but a new translation exchanges Enmebaragesi as the one who captured Dumuzid.

Sumerian King List translations
Reading	Transliteration	Translation
Old	Šu aš en?-me-barag-ge4?-e-si nam-ra [i3?]-ak?	Single handed he (Dumuzid) captured En-me-barage-si.
New	[Šu aš] en?-me-[barag-ge4?-e-si-ta] nam-ra [ak]	He (Dumuzid) was taken captive by the (single) hand of Enmebaragesi.

This clarifies the political and military struggle between Kish and Uruk, the short duration of Dumuzid's rule, and why Dumuzid had no hereditary successors. On this interpretation, after the general-king Lugalbanda in Uruk, Dumuzid the Fisherman from Kuara seized the throne. Enmebaragesi attacked Uruk, captured Dumuzid, subjugated the city, and made Gilgamesh his vassal-king.

=== Defeated by Gilgamesh theory ===
The later Ur III king Shulgi addressed one of his praise poems (Shulgi Hymn O) to Gilgamesh, that credits him with capturing and defeating Enmebaragesi of Kish instead of his son Aga as Gilgamesh and Aga recounts. While in the historical scene of the Early Dynastic period this is quite conceivable, (Note: The prolonged war between Lagash and Umma, known from the inscriptions of five consecutive kings of Lagash.) the assumption of two different wars is difficult to uphold because Gilgamesh emerges as victorious in both; his first victory would imply defeat and submission by the kingdom of Kish.

Since Gilgamesh addresses Aga denoting military relations between them in the past and indebtedness to him for saving his life leads to Gilgamesh being dependent on Aga previously, conflicting with the assumption that he won a previous war against Kish. Another theory is since Enmebaragesi established the hegemony of Kish, defeating Aga would be less impressive than his powerful father, who therefore served the purpose of the hymn and portrays Gilgamesh as a mighty figure. Since Enmebaragesi was inserted to replace Aga, the hymn doesn't reflect a separate but rather one literary tradition from the tale.

== See also ==
- Iry-Hor

== Citations ==
Regnal titles
Preceded by	King of Sumer; Lugal of Kish c. 2750 BC	Succeeded by Aga
