= Birhurtura =

Birhurtura 𒄵𒄯𒌉𒊏
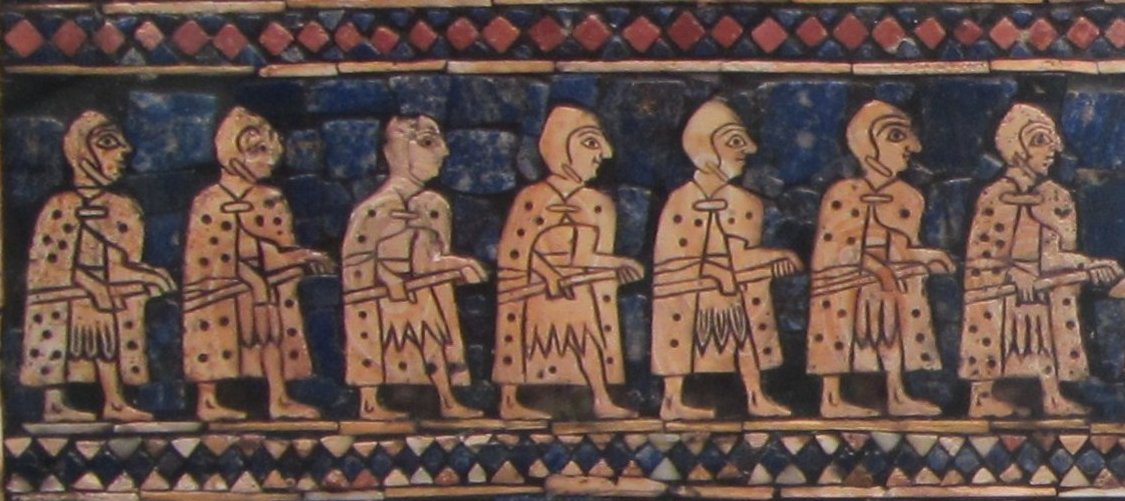
- Soldiers marching in the Standard of Ur, one of the earliest representations of a Sumerian army.
- Military career
- Allegiance: Uruk
- Service years: c. 2600
- Rank: Royal guard
- Conflicts: Siege of Uruk

Birhurtura (𒄵𒄯𒌉𒊏, ḪI×ŠE-ḪI×AŠ₂-tur-ra; sometimes written as BIRHARtura) was a royal guard of Gilgamesh in Uruk. His military exploits are recorded in the Sumerian poem Gilgamesh and Aga, where Kish besieged Uruk to enslave the city into irrigation works.

== Name ==
Jacobsen has identified the name as Caterpillar.

== Siege of Uruk ==
Aga sent messengers to Uruk with a demand to work on the irrigation of Kish as slaves. Gilgamesh goes to the assembly of elders to suggest revealing himself against Aga, however, this proposition is rejected. Gilgamesh, not satisfied with the answer, and trusting the goddess Inanna, goddess of Uruk, proposes the same to the guruš (lit. the able-bodied men). These accept and name Gilgamesh Lugal (𒈗). After four days Aga leads his army to the walls of Uruk. Gilgamesh asks for a volunteer to distract Aga, whose mission Birhurtura fulfills. On leaving the city, he is captured and brought before Aga himself, who interrogates and tortures him. A man leans over the rampart; Aga, confused, asks Birhurtura if he is his king.

Aga saw him and then spoke to Birhur-tura:
Slave, is that man your king?
Birhur-tura then speaks:
That man is not my king!
Were that man my king?
Were that his angry brow?
Were those his bison eyes?
Were that his lapis lazuli beard?
Were those his elegant fingers?
Would he not cast down multitudes?
Would he not raise up multitudes?
Would multitudes not be smeared with dust?
Would not all the nations be overwhelmed?
Would not the land's canal-mouths be filled with silt?
Would not the barges' prows be broken?
And would he not take Aga,
The king of Kish,
Captive in the midst of his army?

Gilgamesh leans to the wall, and his divine radiance is beheld by Aga. Enkidu takes advantage on the diversion and breaks against the enemy army. Gilgamesh captures Aga in the middle of the battle. Finally, Aga reminds him of favors he has done to him in the past, and Gilgamesh sets him free.

While the text does not describe explicitly how Enkidu charged against the enemy troops, Birhurtura’s actions are understood as a depiction to Aga. According to Heimpel, tricking opponents for a dramatic turn in the development of the plot is a recurrent motif in Sumerian literature, as for example, Enki’s trick to release Inanna from the netherworld, Inanna tricking Enki to gain his Me, and Gilgamesh himself for striking Huwawa.
