= Aga of Kish =

Ancient Mesopotamian king

Aga 𒀝𒂵
- Ruler of Sumer; Governor of Umma; Governor of Zabala
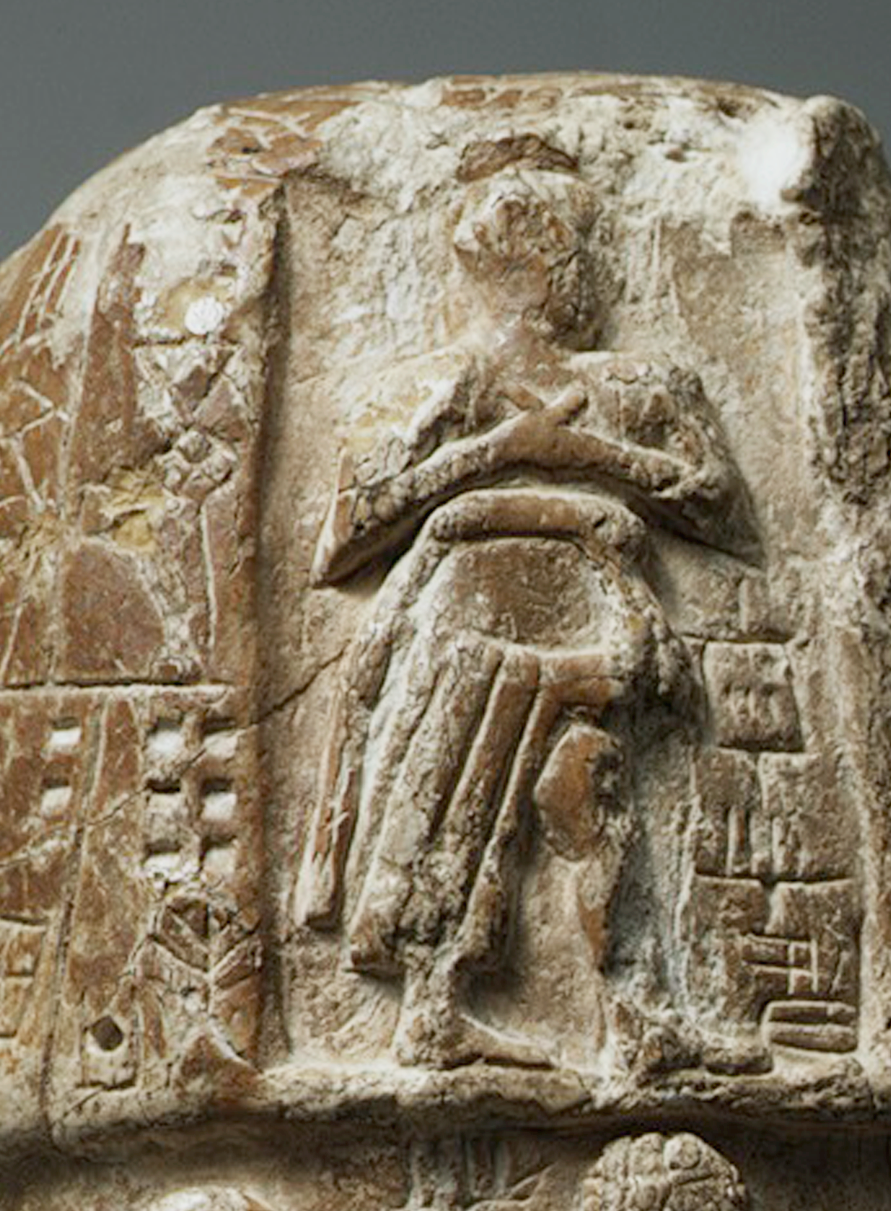
- Aga depicted on the Stele of Ushumgal as official of the Great Assembly of Umma

King of Kish
- Reign: c. 2700 BC
- Predecessor: Enmebaragesi
- Successor: Possibly Munushushumgal
- Father: Enmebaragesi

Aga (Sumerian: 𒀝𒂵 Aga, Agga, or Akkà; fl. c. 2700 BC), commonly known as Aga of Kish, was king in the first dynasty of Kish during the Early Dynastic I period. He is listed in the Sumerian King List as the 23rd king of Kish and is listed in many sources as the son of Enmebaragesi. The Kishite king ruled the city at its peak, probably reaching beyond the territory of Kish, including Umma and Zabala.

The Sumerian poem Gilgamesh and Aga records the Kishite siege of Uruk after its lord Gilgamesh refused to submit to Aga, ending in Aga's defeat and consequently the fall of Kish's hegemony.

== Name ==
The name of Aga is Sumerian^{a} and a relatively rarely attested personal name in Early Dynastic times, making his identification in royal texts spottable. His name appears in the Stele of Ushumgal, as the gal-ukkin ("Great Assembly official").^{b}

AK (𒀝) was likely an Early Dynastic spelling of Akka, (the past particle of the Sumerian verb "to make"). The name in question is to be interpreted as a Sumerian genitival phrase, Akka probably means "Made by [a god]" (ak + Divine Name.ak).

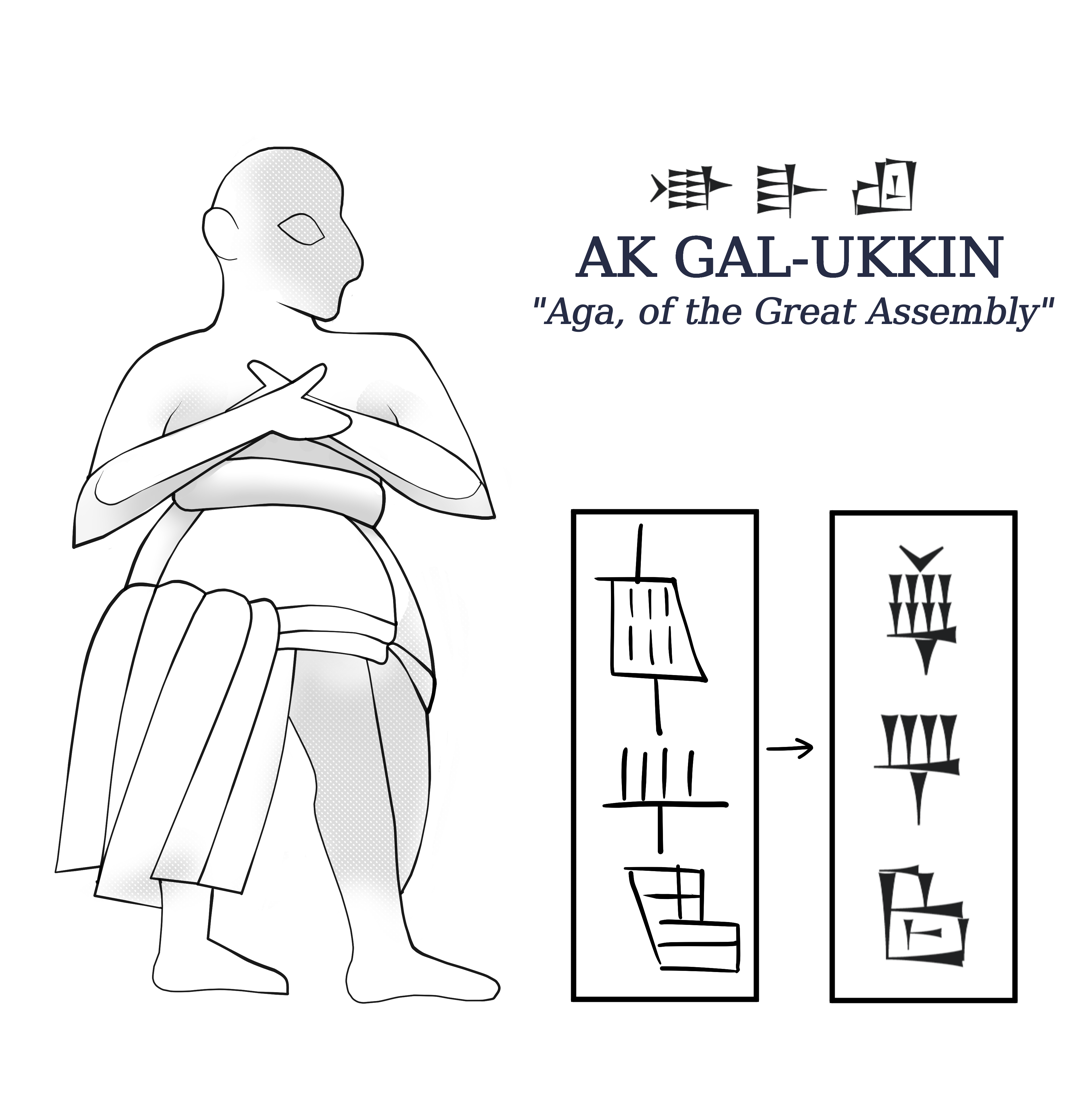
Drawing of Aga on the Stele of Ushumgal. He is named as "Aga of the Great Assembly"

Gem of King Aga
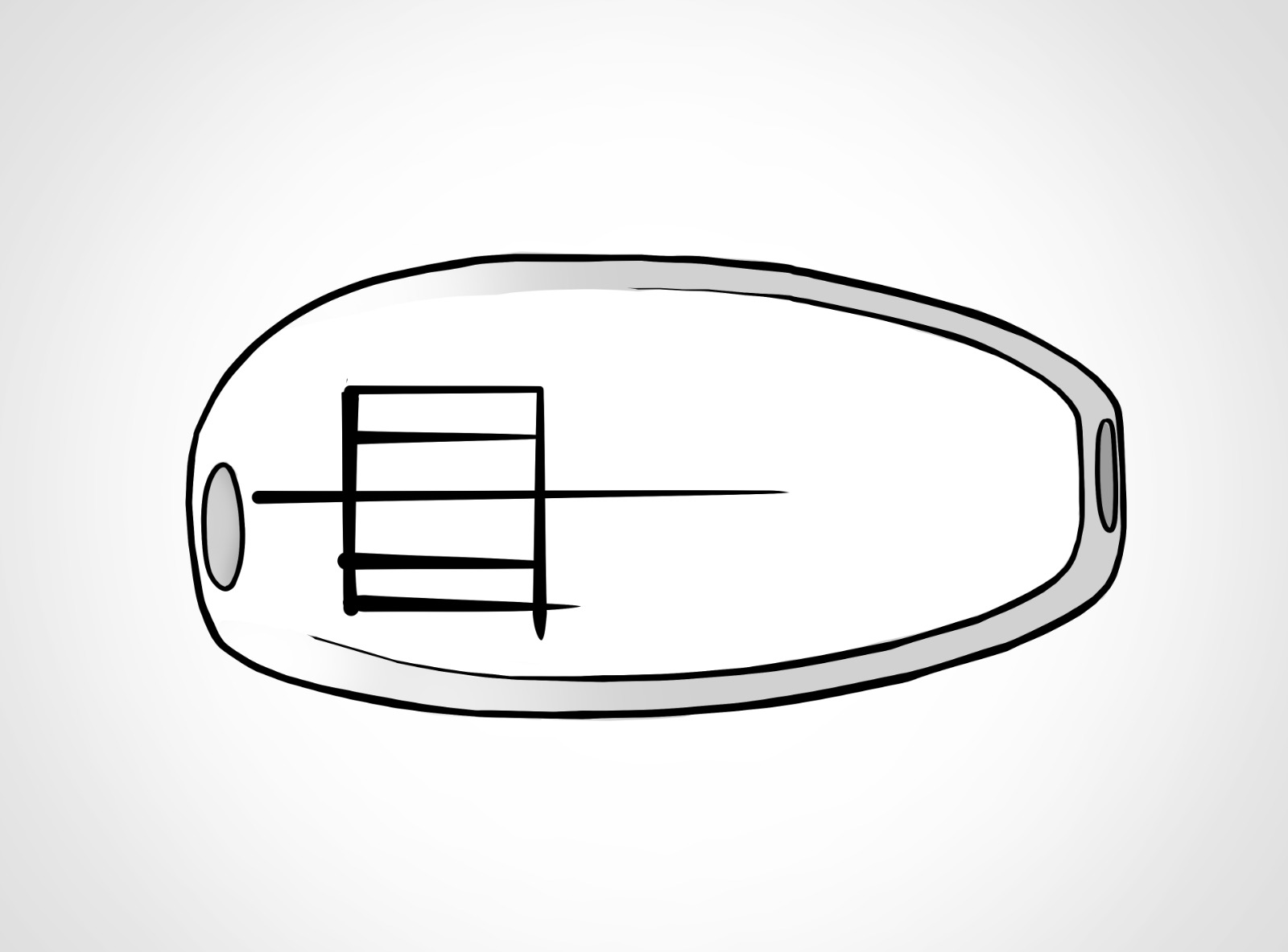
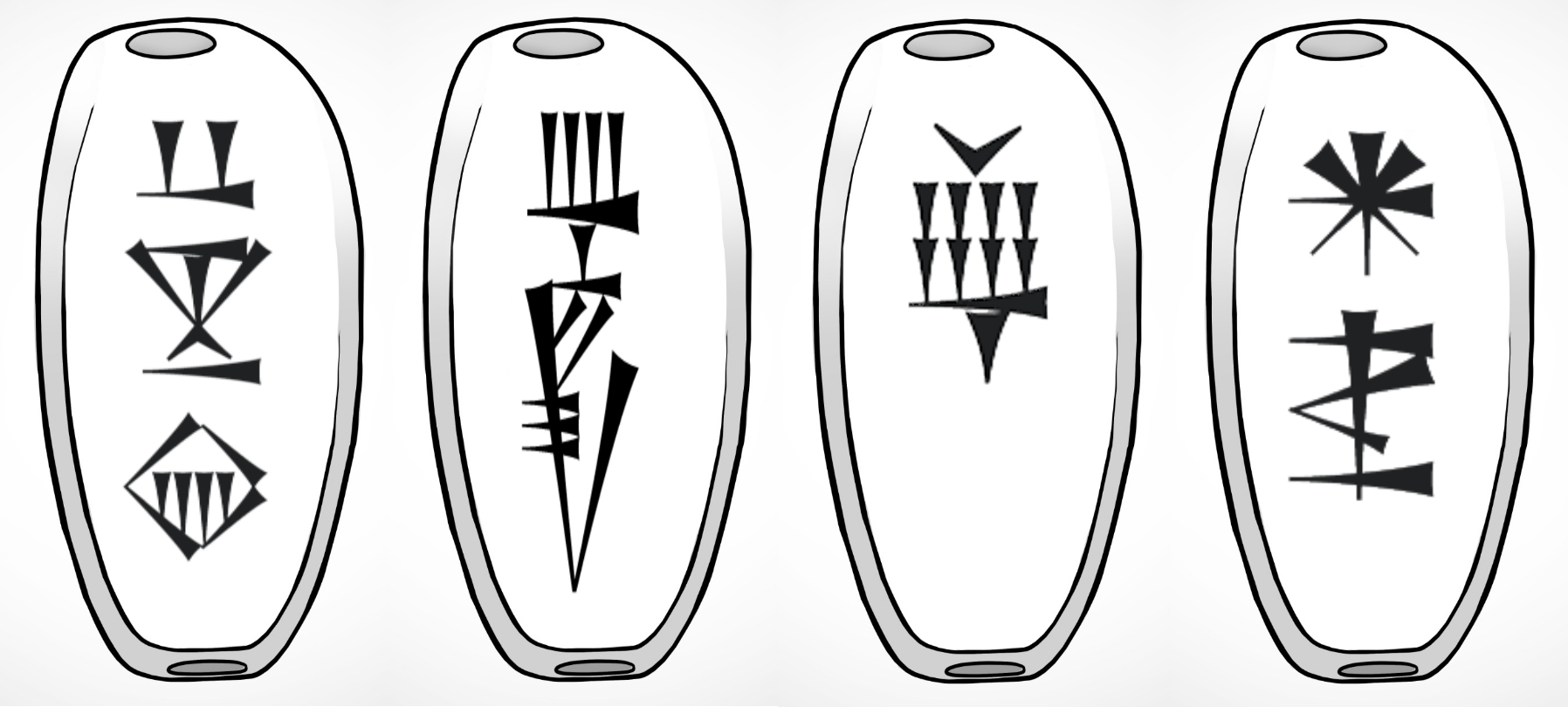
Gem of unknown provenance mentioning Ak (𒀝), an alternate naming for Aga. The gem has four columns of text on its faces, and reads "For Inanna, Aga King of Umma" (𒀭𒈹𒀝𒈗𒄑𒆵𒆠, ^{d}inanna ak lugal umma^{ki}).

Distinct forms attested of Aga's name
Cuneiform	Transliteration	Main inscription	Period
𒀝	Ag/Ak	Stele of Ushumgal; Gem of King Aga	2900-2700 BC
𒀝𒂵	Ag-ga/Ak-ka	Gilgamesh and Aga; Tummal Inscription	1900–1600 BC
𒀝𒃷	Ag-ga3/Ak-ka3	Sumerian King List	1900–1600 BC

== Historical king ==
Aga is attested in two compositions of an historiographical nature, the Sumerian King List and the Tummal Inscription, both as the son of Enmebaragesi, who has been verified through archaeological inscriptions; these sources may confirm Aga and Gilgamesh's existence. Aga's name appears in the Stele of Ushumgal and the Gem of King Aga, both showing influence over Umma.

Enmebaragesi,
the king in this very city (Nippur),
built the House of Enlil,
Agga the son of Enmebaragesi,
made the Tummal pre-eminent.

— Old Babylonian tablet Tummal Inscription (1900-1600 BC)

=== Reign ===
According to the Sumerian King List (ETCSL 2.1.1), Kish had the hegemony of Sumer where he reigned 625 years, succeeding his father Enmebaragesi to the throne, finally ending in defeat by Uruk.

The use of the royal title King of Kish expressing a claim of national rulership owes its prestige to the fact that Kish once did rule the entire nation. His reign probably covered Umma, and consequently Zabala, which was a dependent of it in the Early Dynastic Period; this can be supported on his appearance in the Gem of King Aga, where he is mentioned as the king of Umma. There is some scant evidence to suggest that like the later Ur III kings, the rulers of ED Kish sought to ingratiate themselves to the authorities in Nippur, possibly to legitimize a claim for leadership over the land of Sumer or at least part of it. Archeological evidence from Kish shows a city flourishing in ED II with its political influence extending beyond the territory, however in ED III the city declined rapidly.

== Gilgamesh and Aga ==
In the poem Gilgamesh and Aga (ETCSL 1.8.1.1), Aga of Kish sends messengers to his vassal Gilgamesh in Uruk with a demand slave labor for the irrigation of Kish.

There are wells to be finished.
There are wells in the land to be finished.
There are shallow wells in the land to be completed.
There are deep wells and hoisting ropes to be completed.

— Aga commanding Uruk to work for the irrigation of Kish.

Gilgamesh repeats the message before the "city fathers" (ab-ba-iri) to suggest defiance of Aga, but the elders refuse. Gilgamesh, goes on to incite rebellion among the guruš (able-bodied men) who would have to do the labor. They refer to Aga as the "son of the king", which suggests he was still young and immature. The guruš accept Gilgamesh's call to revolt and declare him lugal (king).^{c}

After ten days, Aga lays siege to the walls of Uruk, whose citizens are now confused and intimidated. Gilgamesh asks for a volunteer to stand before Aga; his royal guard Birhurtura offers himself. On leaving the city gates, he is captured and brought before Aga, who interrogates and tortures him. Aga asks an Uruk soldier leaning over the wall if Birhurtura is his king. Birhurtura denies this, replying that when the true king appears, he will beat capture Aga and beat his army to dust. The infuriated Aga redoubles his torture.

Then Gilgamesh leans over the wall. Aga withstands his divine radiance, but it terrifies the Kishite army. Enkidu and the guruš take advantage of their confusion to cut through them and capture Aga in the middle of his army. Gilgamesh addresses Aga as his superior, remembering how Aga saved his life and gave him refuge; Aga withdraws his demand and begs his favor to be returned. Gilgamesh, in the sight of his god Utu, sets Aga free to return to Kish.

Story of Gilgamesh and Aga
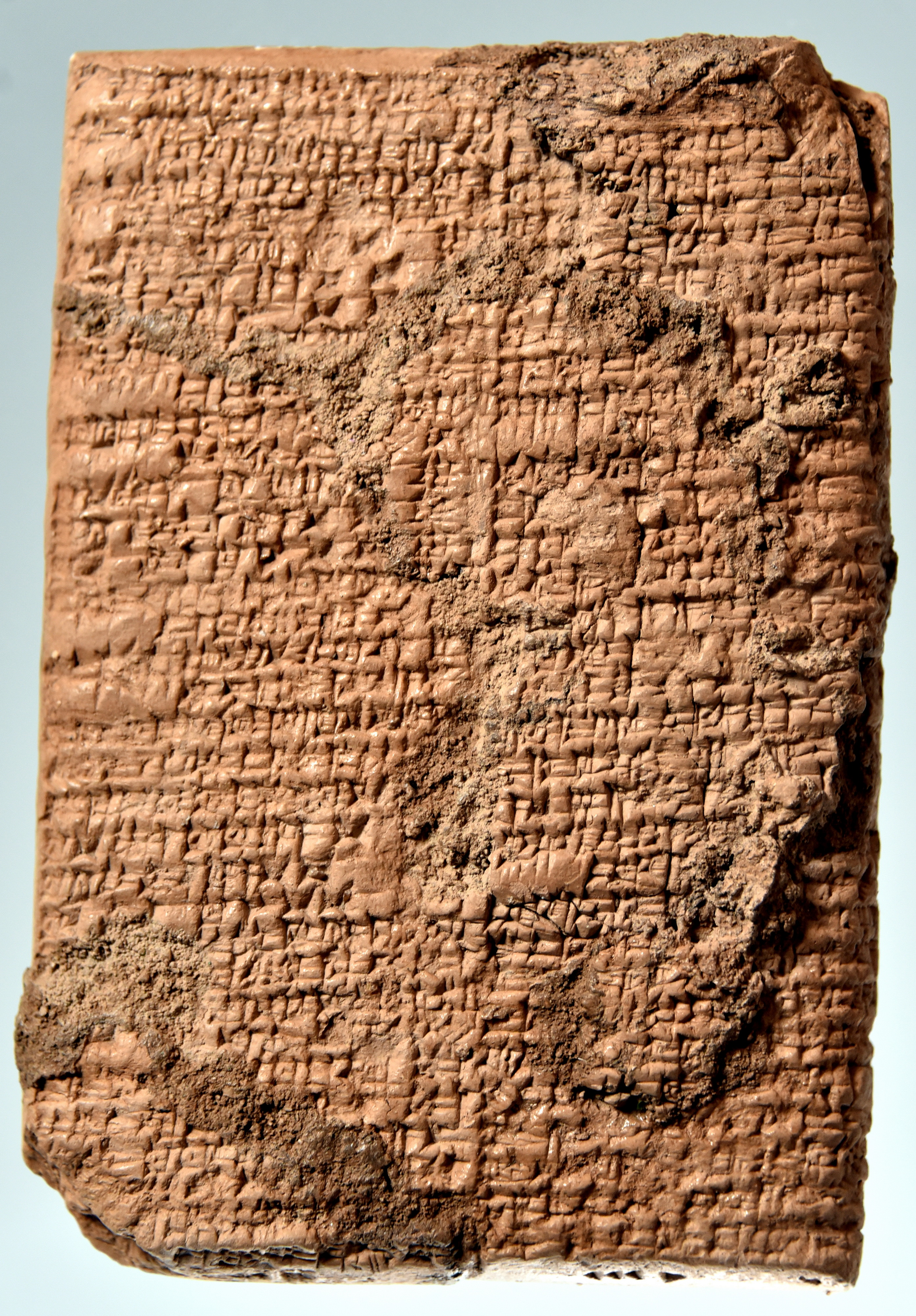
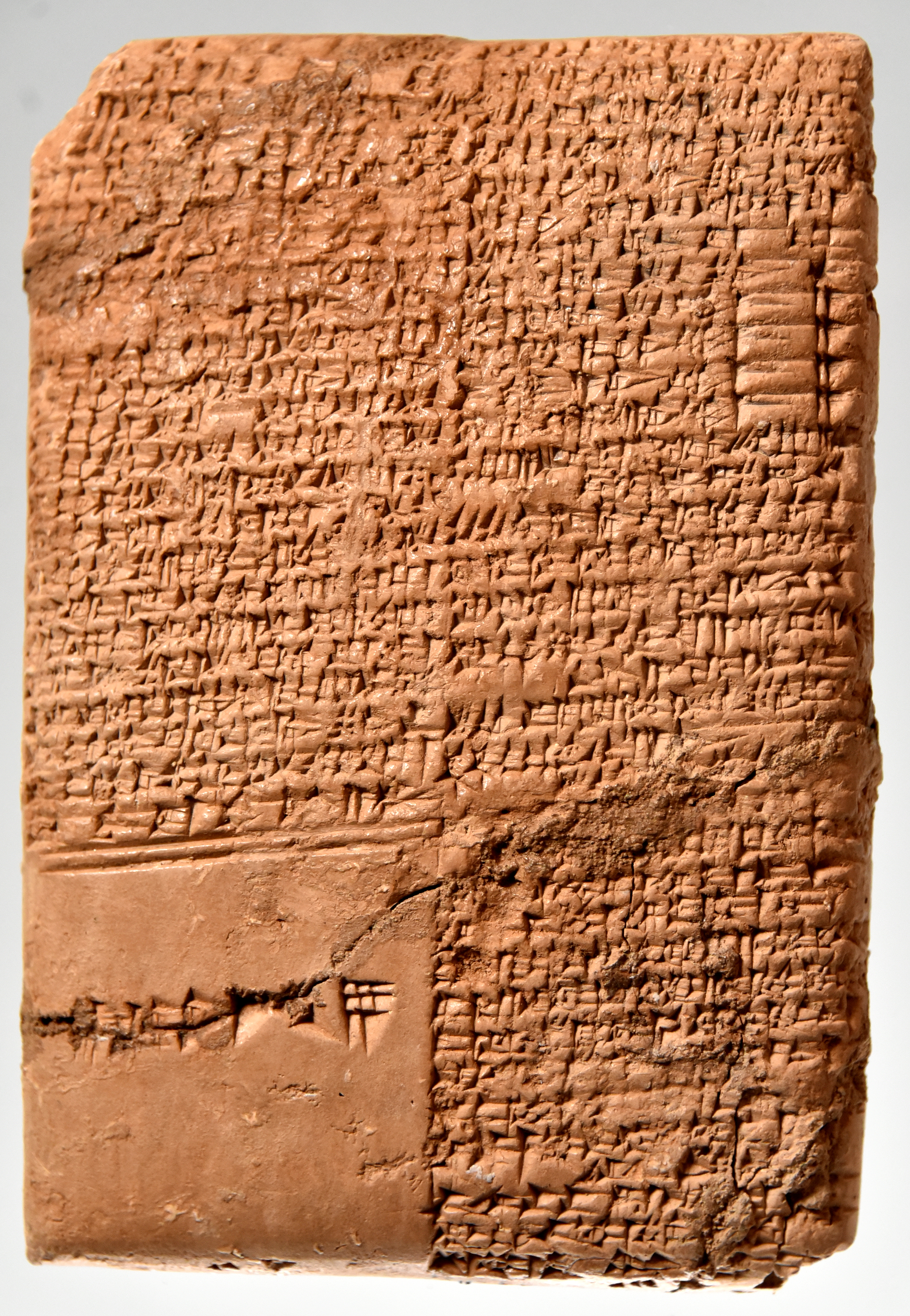
Story of Gilgamesh and Aga. Old Babylonian period. Sulaymaniyah Museum, Iraq

=== Replacement in the poem ===
The Shulgi Hymn O (ETCSL 2.1.1) of the Ur III ruler Shulgi (c. 2094 BC – 2047 BC) praises Gilgamesh for defeating Enmebaragesi of Kish rather than his son. While such an encounter is quite conceivable,^{d} the assumption of two different wars is difficult to uphold because Gilgamesh emerges as victorious in both; his first victory would have left Kish already defeated, pre-empting the second victory. If Gilgamesh had won a previous war against Kish, he would not have spoken with Aga of past military cooperation and indebtedness for saving his life.

Another theory is that for literary considerations, the founding hegemon Enmebaragesi would be a more impressive opponent than his son. Enmebaragesi was merely inserted to replace Aga, and the different versions of the hymn constitute to a single literary work.

== See also ==
- History of Sumer
- Epic of Gilgamesh
- Sumerian literature
- Agag

== Notes ==
a. The rest of the Kish dynasty had Akkadian names, such as Jushur, Zuqaqip or Mashda.

b. gal-ukkin-na (𒃲𒌺𒈾) "Chairman of the Assembly".

c. Lugal is Gilgamesh's title in wartime, while his official title is En of Kulaba.

d. The prolonged war between Lagash and Umma, known from the inscriptions of five consecutive kings of Lagash.

== Citations ==
Regnal titles
Preceded by Enmebaragesi	Ruler of Sumer c. 2900-2700 BC	Succeeded by Gilgamesh
Preceded by Enmebaragesi	Ensi of Kish c. 2750 BC	Succeeded by Possibly Munushushumgal
