= Stele of Ushumgal =

Early Sumerian stone tablet

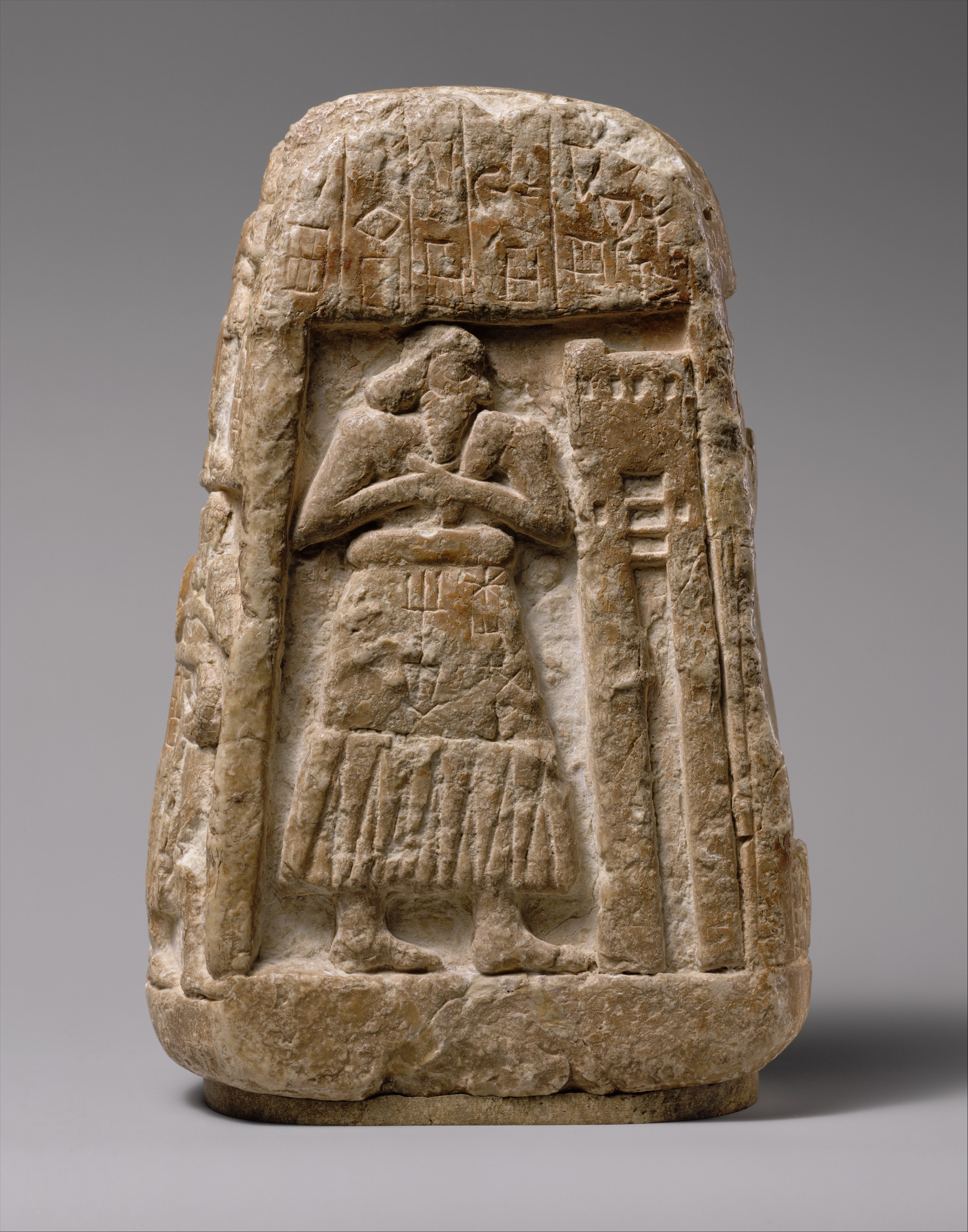
- The stele, showing the priest Ushumgal (𒀭𒃲𒁔, ^{D}ushumgal)
- Material: Gypsum alabaster
- Height: 22 cm
- Created: c. 2800 BC
- Discovered: Possibly Umma; 31.621369°N 45.933406°E
- Present location: Metropolitan Museum of Art, New York City
- Registration: Metropolitan Museum of Art 58.29

Location

The Stele of Ushumgal is an early Sumerian stone tablet, dating to the Early Dynastic I-II (c. 2900-2700 BCE), and probably originating from Umma. It is currently located in the Metropolitan Museum of Art, New York City.

The stele is 22 cm high. It is partially deciphered, refers to an early transfer of land ownership. A large man is inscribed with a label, which can be read “Ušumgal, the pab-šeš priest of (the deity) Šara”. On the other side stands Shara-igizi-Abzu, the daughter of Ushumgal.

The stele has been described as a type of "ancient Kudurru", a sort of stele known from the Kassites period in the 2nd millennium BCE.

The name "Akka" appears in the Stele of Ushumgal, as Ak gal-ukkin, "Ak gal-ukkin official". It has been suggested this could refer to Aga of Kish himself.

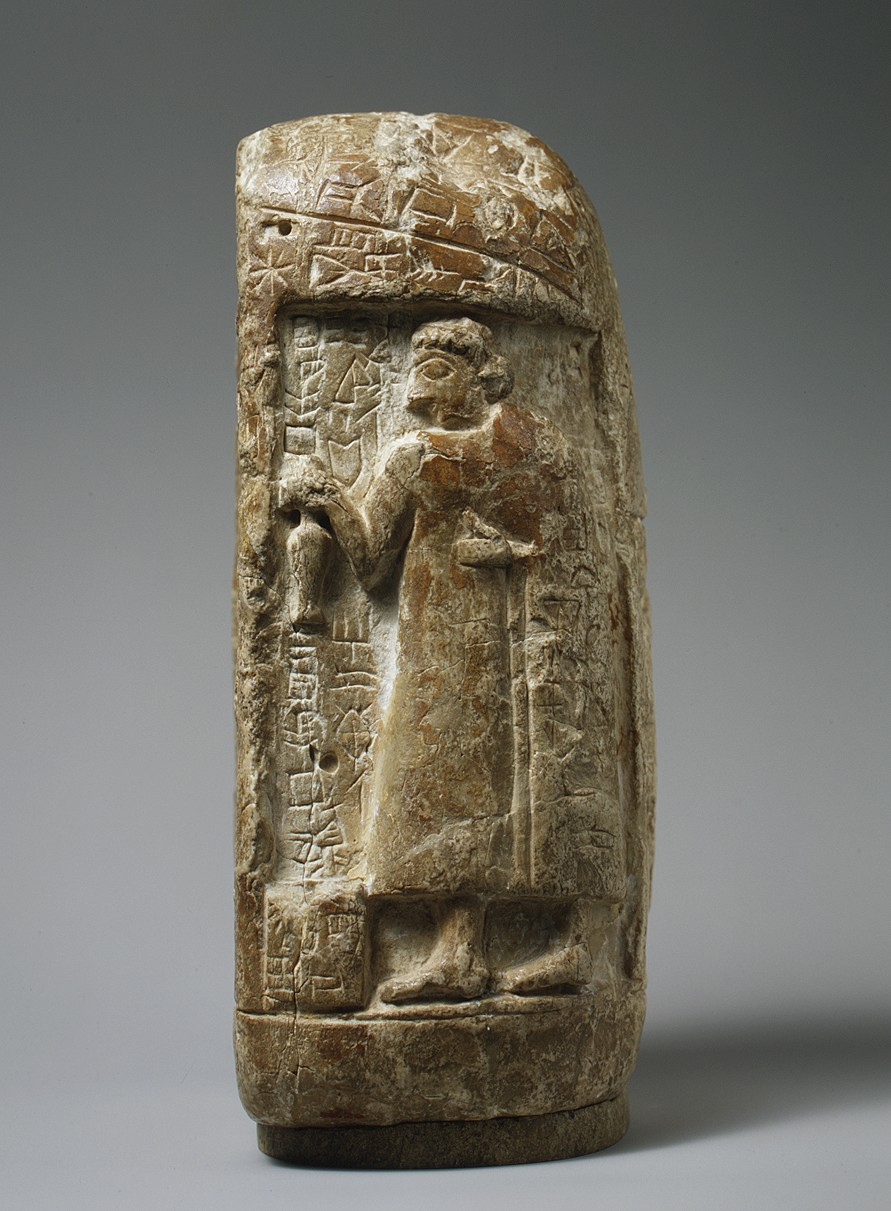
The daughter of Ushumgal

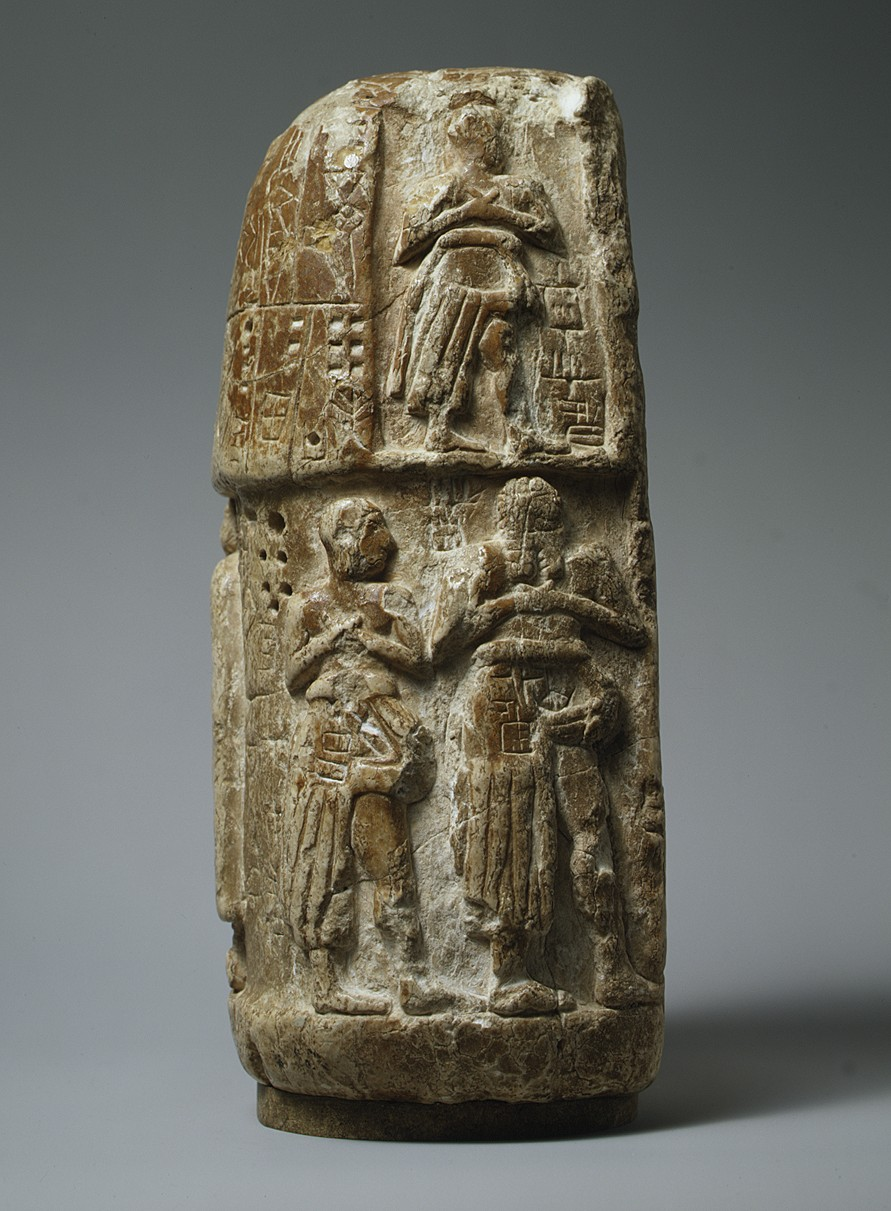
Three men, possibly from a local council

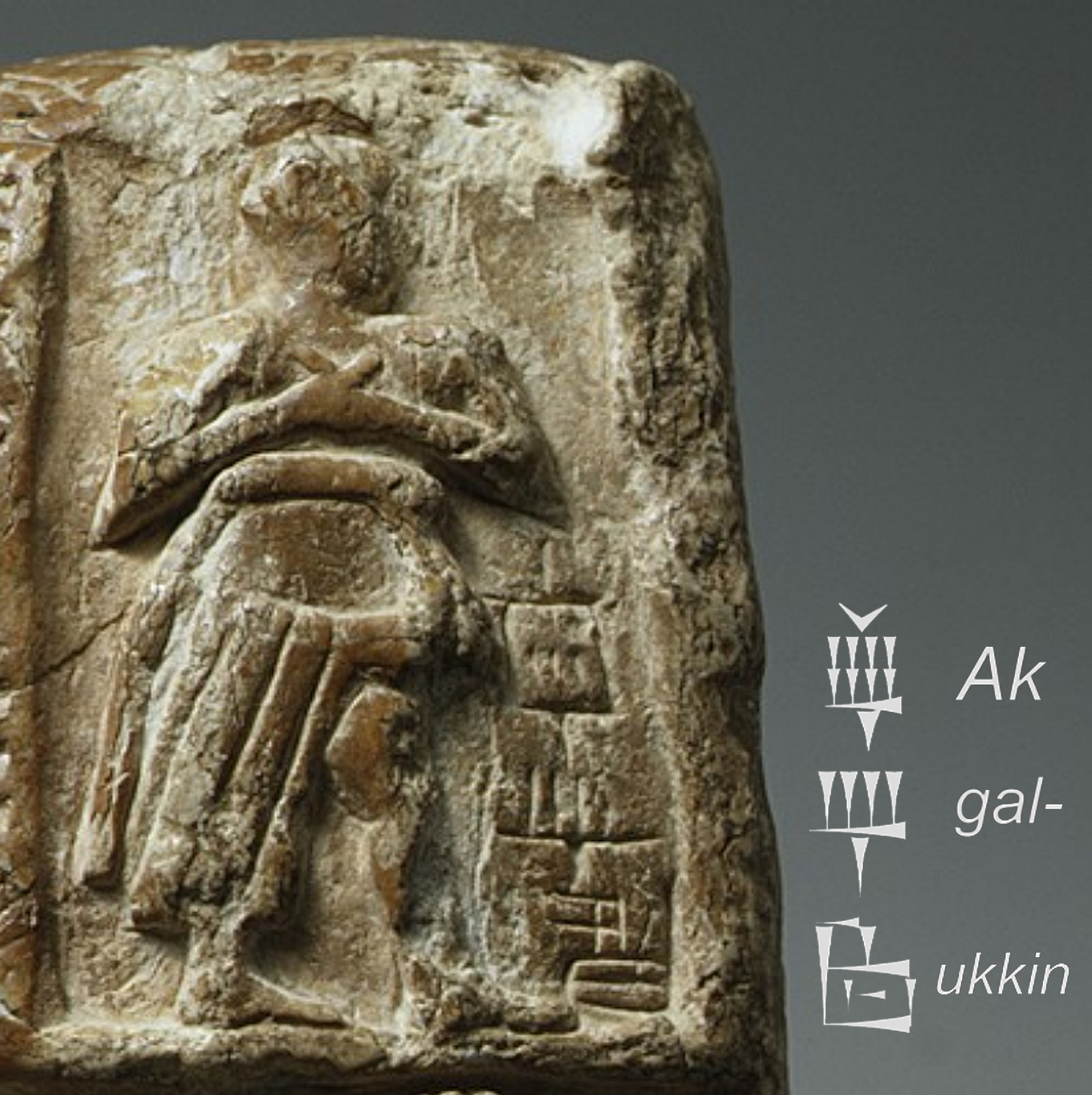
The name "Akka" appears in the Stele of Ushumgal, as Ak gal-ukkin, "Ak gal-ukkin official". It has been suggested this could refer to King Aga of Kish himself.

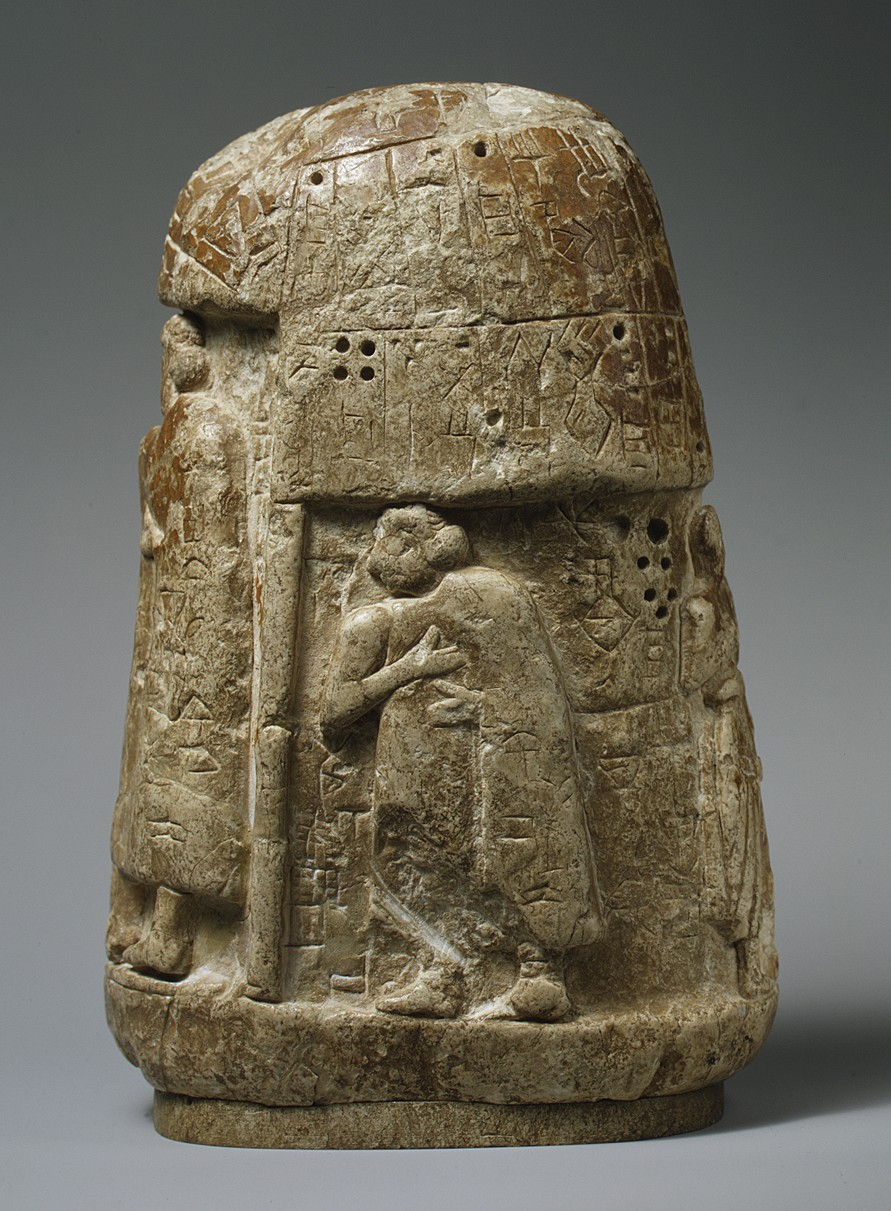
Another figure

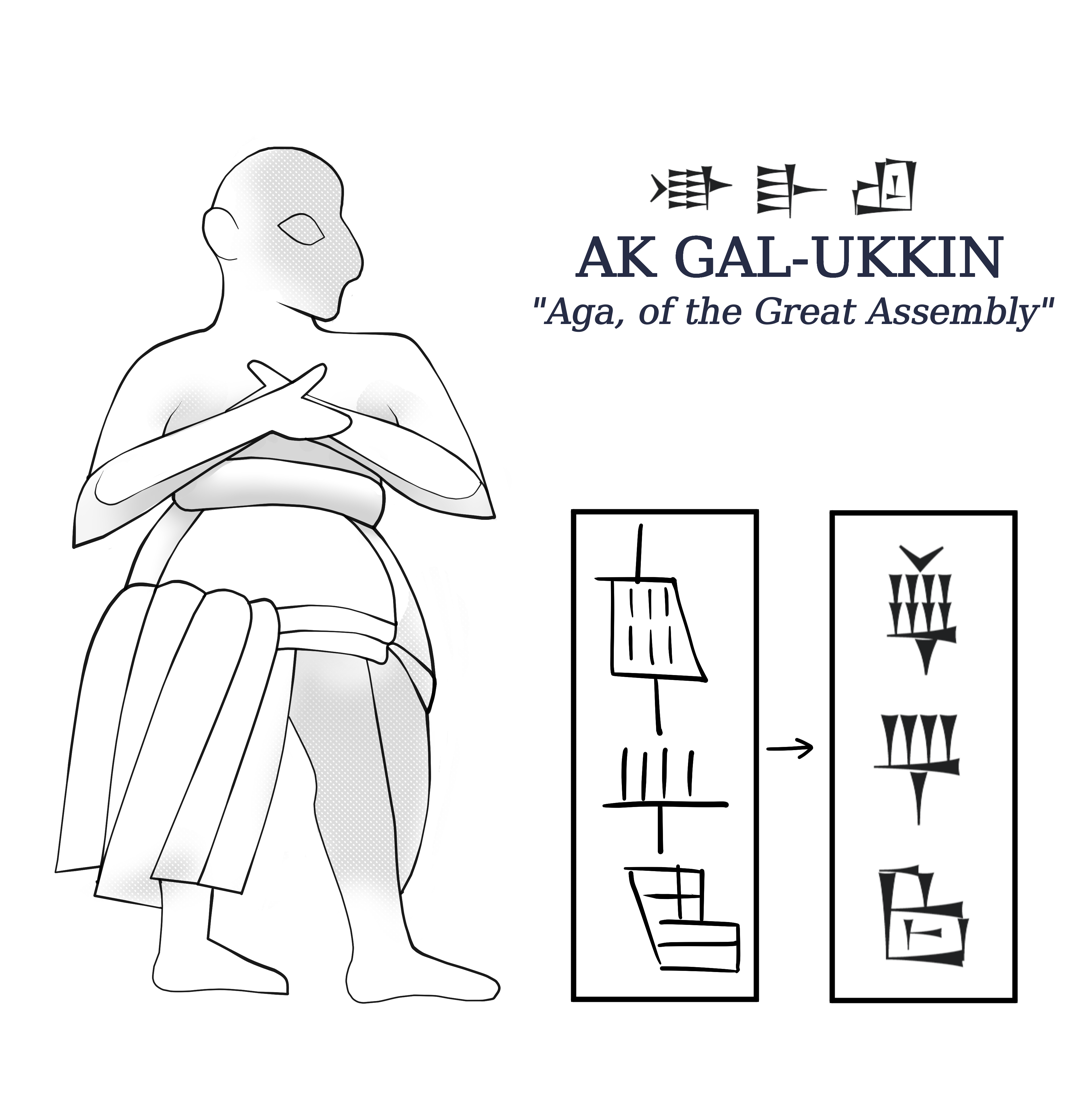
Line art of Aga of Kish from the Stele of Ushumgal

== See also ==
- Blau Monuments
- Warka Vase
