= Ukkin =

Sumerian word for Divine council

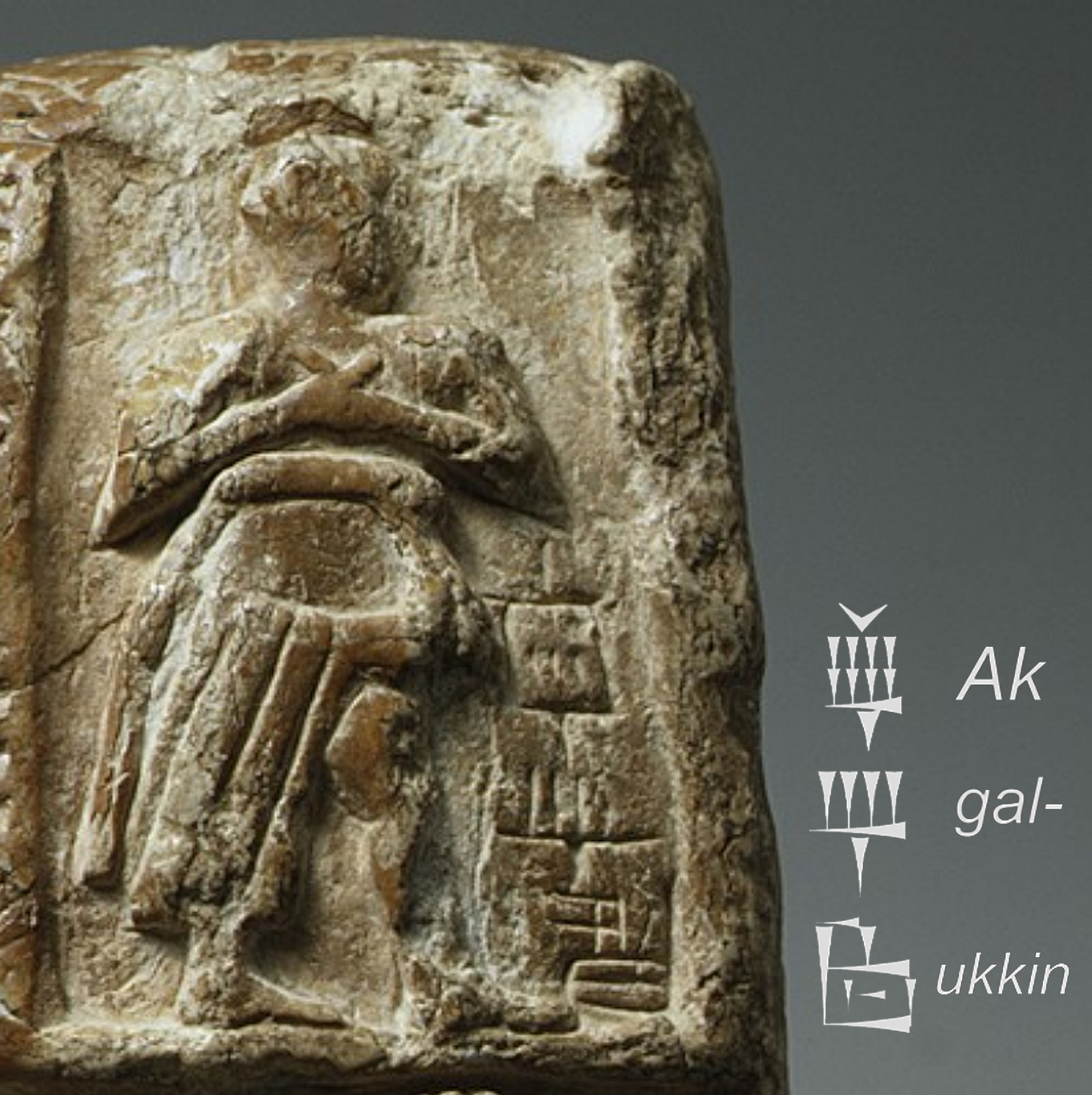
The name "Akka" appears in the Stele of Ushumgal, as Ak gal-ukkin, "Ak gal-ukkin (Great Assembly) official". It has been suggested this could refer to Aga of Kish himself.

Ukkin (UKKIN) is the Sumerian word or symbol for assembly, temple council or Divine council, written ideographically with the cuneiform sign 𒌺 (Borger 2003 nr. 73, encoded by Unicode at code point U+1233A).

In Akkadian it is transliterated as Puḫru or Puḫrum and was used in the context of "public assembly", of both Gods and people with the ultimate meaning of a "totality" of living things. A council of the gods specifically is referred to in Akkadian as Puḫru Ilani or Puḫur Ilani. The word was later adopted into Aramaic. In Hittite language it is transliterated as Pankuš or Tuyila. In the Hellenistic era the word Kiništu was used and it found an equivalent in the word Qāhāl in other ancient languages.

H. Zimmern noted that the Babylonian New Year feast was also called puhru and connected this with the modern day Jewish holiday of Purim.
