= Kalumum =

Sumerian ruler in the First Dynasty of Kish

Kalumum 𒅗𒇻𒈬𒌝
- First appearance: Sumerian King List c. 2000 BC

In-universe information
- Occupation: King of Kish (reigned c. 840 years)

Kalumum (Sumerian:𒅗𒇻𒈬𒌝) of Kish was the eighth Sumerian king in the First Dynasty of Kish, according to the Sumerian king list. Like the other members of the First dynasty prior to Etana, he was named for an animal; his name "Kalumun" is Akkadian for "lamb". Kalulum is unlikely to have existed as his name does not appear on texts dating from the period in which he was presumed to have lived (Early Dynastic period).

Regnal titles
Preceded by Kalibum	King of Sumer legendary	Succeeded by Zuqaqip
Preceded by Kalibum	Ensi of Kish legendary	Succeeded by Zuqaqip
