= Kish (Sumer) =

Ancient Sumerian city

- Location within Iraq
- 32°32′25″N 44°36′17″E
- Type: Settlement
- Periods: Ubaid to Hellenistic
- Location: Tell al-Uhaymir, Babil Governorate, Iraq
- Region: Mesopotamia

History
- Built: Ubaid period

Site notes
- Excavation dates: 1852, 1912, 1923–1933, 1989, 2000–2001
- Archaeologists: Austen Henry Layard, Julius Oppert, Henri de Genouillac, Stephen Langdon, Hideo Fuji, Ken Matsumoto

Kish (Sumerian: Kiš; transliteration: Kiš^{ki}; cuneiform: 𒆧𒆠; Akkadian: Kiššatu, near modern Tell al-Uhaymir) is an important archaeological site in Babil Governorate (Iraq), located 80 km (50 mi) south of Baghdad and 12 km (7.5 mi) east of the ancient city of Babylon. The Ubaid period site of Ras al-Amiyah is 8 km (5.0 mi) away. It was occupied from the Ubaid period to the Hellenistic period. In Early Dynastic times the city's patron deity was Ishtar with her consort Ea. Her temple, at Tell Ingharra, was (E)-hursag-kalama. By Old Babylonian times the patron deities had become Zababa, along with his consort, the goddess Bau and Istar. His temple Emeteursag (later Ekišiba) was at Uhaimir.

== History ==
The ancient cities of Sumer.

=== Chalcolithic ===
==== Ubaid period ====
Kish was occupied from the Ubaid periods (c.5300–4300 BC), gaining prominence as one of the pre-eminent powers in the region during the Early Dynastic Periods all when it reached its maximum extent of 230 hectares.

=== Early Bronze Age ===
The Sumerian King List (SKL) states that Kish was the first city to have kings following the deluge. The 1st dynasty of Kish begins with Ĝushur. Ĝushur's successor is called Kullassina-bel, but this is actually a sentence in Akkadian meaning "All of them were lord". Thus, some scholars have suggested that this may have been intended to signify the absence of a central authority in Kish for a time. The names of the next nine kings of Kish preceding Etana are Nanĝišlišma, En-tarah-ana, Babum, Puannum, Kalibum, Kalumum, Zuqaqip, Aba, Mašda, and Arwium.

==== Uruk period ====
Late Chalcolithic/Early Bronze I. Archaeological finds from the Uruk period (c. 3900-3100 BC) indicate that the site was part of the Uruk Expansion and hence originally Sumerian language speaking. Ignace Gelb identified Kish as the center of the earliest East Semitic culture which he calls the Kish civilization, however the concept has been challenged by more recent scholarship.

==== Jemdet Nasr period ====
Early Bronze IIA (c. 3050/3000-2900/2850 BC). During the Jemdet Nasr period, little is known.

Excavations conducted by the Oxford-Field Museum expedition (1923–1933) identified significant flood deposits from the Euphrates River that disrupted the city's occupation. At the Ingharra mound (East Kish), archaeologists discovered a thick layer of yellow-green sand and silt, completely devoid of artifacts, separating the Jemdet Nasr period from the Early Dynastic I (ED I) period.

==== Early Dynastic period ====
Early Bronze IIB (c. 2900/2850-2750 BC). In Early Dynasty I-II little is known.

Early Bronze IIIA (c. 2750-2500 BC). Early Dynastic IIIA. Of the twenty-first king of Kish on the list, Enmebaragesi, who is said to have captured the weapons of Elam, is the first name confirmed by archaeological finds from his reign. He is also known through other literary references, in which he and his son Aga of Kish are portrayed as contemporary rivals of Dumuzid, the Fisherman, and Gilgamesh, early rulers of Uruk.

Some early kings of Kish are known through archaeology, but are not named on the SKL. It can be difficult to determine if these are actually rulers of Kish or had merely adopted the common appellation "King of Kish". This includes Mesilim, who built temples in Adab and Lagash, where he seems to have exercised some control. Two other examples were the sleeve of an Early Dynastic II bronze sword found at Girsu which read "Lugal-namni[r]-sum (is) king of Kis" and a statue fragment found at Nippur which read "Enna-il, king of Kis".

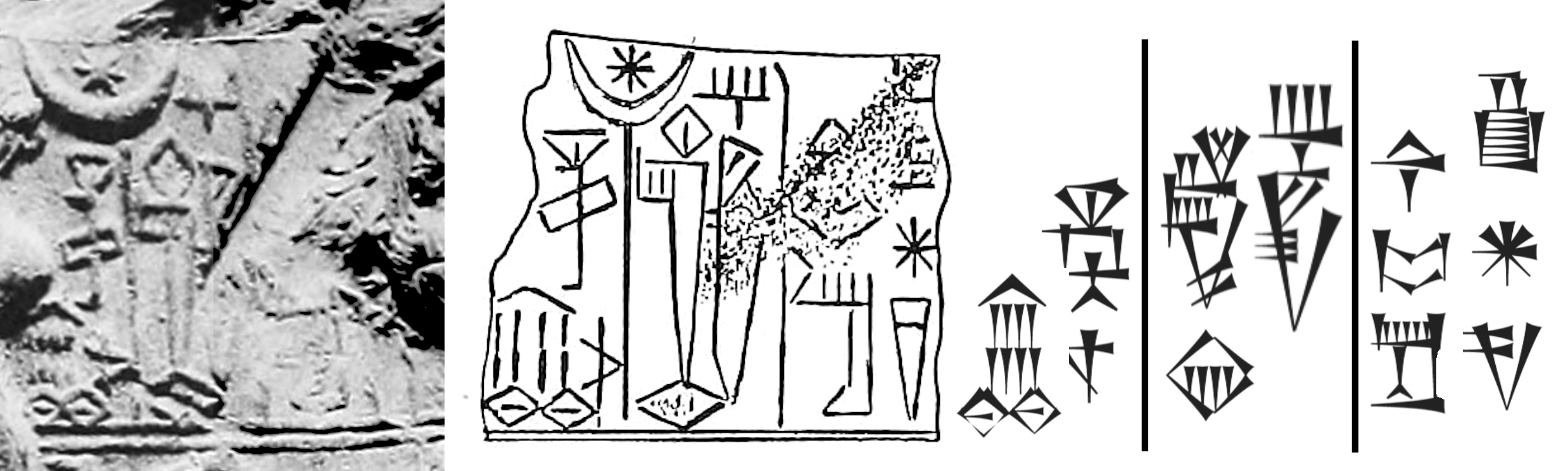
Mesannepada, Lugal Kish-ki (𒈩𒀭𒉌𒅆𒊒𒁕 𒈗 𒆧𒆠), "Mesannepada, King of Kish", on a seal impression found in the Royal Cemetery at Ur. The last column of characters, is thought to mean "his wife..." (𒁮𒉡𒍼, dam-nu-gig).

Early Bronze IIIB (c. 2500-2350 BC). In Early Dynastic IIIB, after its early supremacy, Kish declined economically and militarily, but retained a strong political and symbolic significance. Its influence reached as far west as the city of Ebla near the Mediterranean Sea, as shown by the Ebla tablets. According to the Ebla tablets, Kish was defeated in the time of Ebla ruler Ishar-Damu, probably by Uruk. Shortly afterward Kish joined Ebla in defeating Mari, followed by the marriage of the Eblan princess Keshdut to a king of Kish. Just as with Nippur to the south, control of Kish was a prime element in legitimizing dominance over the north of Mesopotamia. Because of the city's symbolic value, strong rulers later claimed the traditional title "King of Kish", even if they were from Akkad, Ur, Assyria, Isin, Larsa or Babylon. One of the earliest to adopt this title upon subjecting Kish to his empire was King Mesannepada of Ur.

==== Akkadian period ====
Early Bronze IVA (c. 2350-2150 BC). The Akkadian Period began with Sargon of Akkad (r. 2334-2279 BC) who founded the Akkadian Empire (c. 2334-2154 BC). He came from the area near Kish, called Azupiranu according to a much later Neo-Assyrian text purporting to be an autobiography of Sargon.

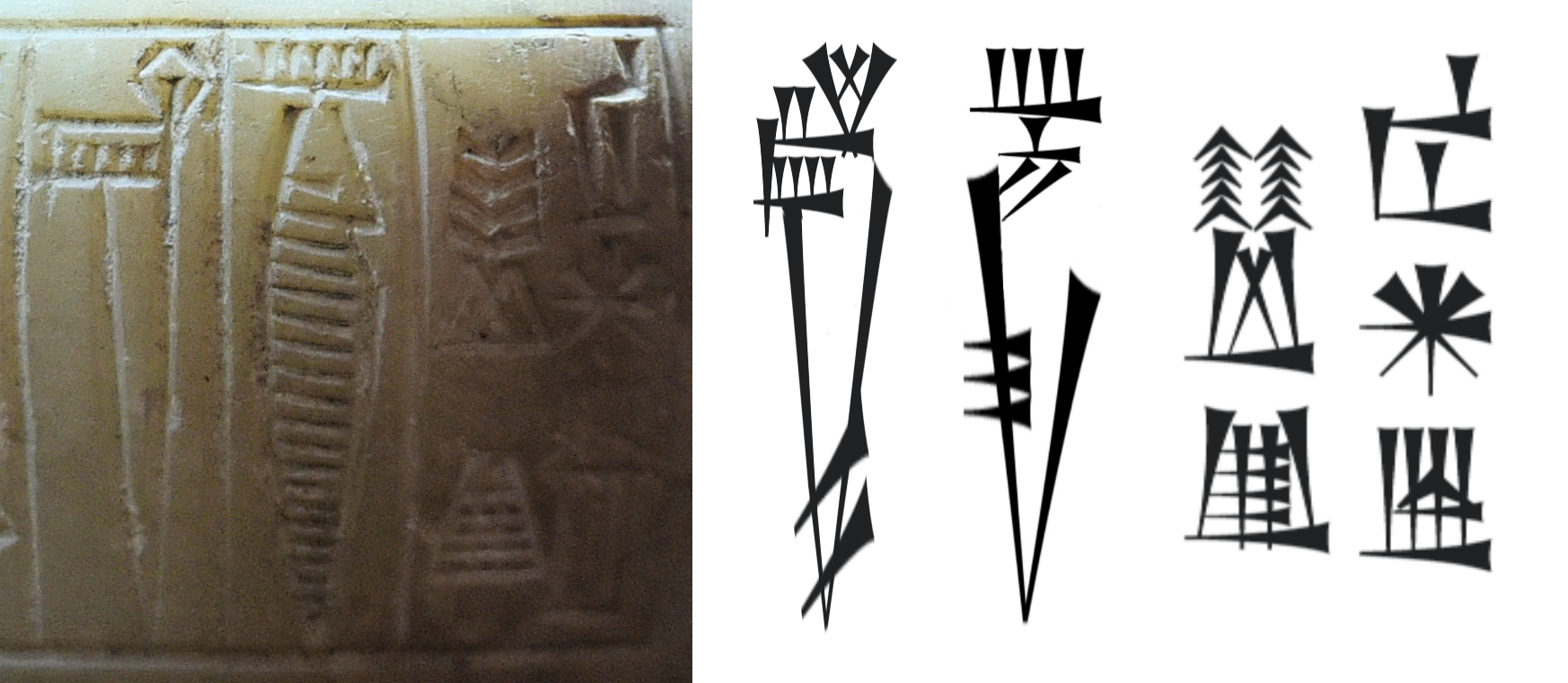
Macehead inscription of Manishtushu, ruler of the Akkadian Empire: Manishtushu Lugal Kish, "Manishtushu King of Kish"

During the reign of Manishtushu, he used the title "Lugal Kish" in inscriptions.

By 2154 BC, the Fall of the Akkadian Empire was due to major climate change causing drought (4.2 ka event). This led to a political turmoil known as the Gutian period with hords of highland Gutians raiding the urban cities on the plain.

==== Ur III period ====
Early Bronze IVB (c. 2150-2020/2000 BC). During the Ur III Period (c. 2112–2004 BC), also known as the Neo-Sumerian Empire, the city of Kish occupied a unique position. While it was no longer the seat of an independent hegemony as it had been in the Early Dynastic period, it remained a vital strategic and ideological center under the centralized administration of the Third Dynasty of Ur. Kish was governed by an ensi (governor) appointed by the kings of Ur. Records show these governors were heavily involved in the bala system—a complex tax and redistribution network. Kish served as a major provincial capital. Because of its location in northern Babylonia, it acted as a gateway between the Sumerian south and the Semitic-speaking regions to the north and west. It was a crucial node on the royal roads connecting the capital, Ur, to the northern frontier.

In terms of economy, tablets archive shows the management of "gangs" of laborers (guruš and geme). They were employed in large-scale agricultural projects and the maintenance of the irrigation canals, such as the Irim-Kiš canal. Kish was a primary producer of barley and emmer. Tablets shows precise caloric rationing for workers, reflecting a highly "math-heavy" and bureaucratic approach to state economy.

The religion was dominated by the Temple of Zababa with the city’s patron deity was Zababa (a warrior god). The Ur III kings, particularly Shulgi and Shu-Sin, invested heavily in the restoration of his temple, E-meteursag. Cultic offerings are shown from documents at the central livestock agency at Puzrish-Dagan record frequent shipments of cattle and sheep specifically destined for the altars in Kish, indicating its continued status as a "holy city."

Archaeological evidence from the Ur III layers at Tell al-Uhaymir is somewhat sparse compared to the Early Dynastic layers, largely because the Neo-Sumerian structures were often built over or recycled by later Babylonian builders. However, the presence of stamped bricks bearing the names of Ur III kings confirms their active construction programs in the city.

By 2036 BC, an abrupt climate change hit hard for about a decade, probably caused by a major volcanic eruption. Colder weather in the northern hemisphere and drought in Mesopotamia saw Ur III Empire struggle with grain prices rising and rebellions emerge. After that, the Ur III never recovered and declined until its fall in 2004 BC - marking the end of the Early Bronze Age. The governorate of Kish fell out of the central authority of Ur III becoming an independent regional power again.

=== Middle Bronze Age ===
==== Isin-Larsa period ====
Middle Bronze IA (c. 2020/2000-1900 BC). In the Isin-Larsa period, Kish became a "buffer state" and a frequent prize in the power struggle between the rival cities of Isin and Larsa. Following the Elamite destruction of Ur, the centralized bureaucracy vanished. Local dynasties seized the opportunity to declare sovereignty. Kish regained its status as an semi-independent kingdom for several decades, though it was often squeezed between larger regional powers. Its strategic location near the northern irrigation networks made Kish a target.

==== Old Babylonian period ====
Middle Bronze IB (c. 1900-1820 BC). By the early part of the First Dynasty of Babylon Kish was under the control of Babylon with the tenth year name of ruler Sumu-abum (c. 1897–1883 BC) being "Year in which (Sumu-abum) made for Kish its city wall (reaching) heaven" (repeated in following year). Not long afterward, Kish was conquered by Sumuel of Larsa as reflected in his eleventh year name "Year the army of Kisz was smitten by weapons", repeated in the following three year names. In the 13th year of Sumu-la-El he reports destroying Kish (repeated in following four years) and then destroying the city wall of Kish in his 19th year and in his 30th year "Year the temple of Zababa, the Emeteursag / the house, ornament of the heros (Zababa), was built". At this point Kish came under the control of the city-state of Eshnunna under rulers ^{D}Ipiq-Adad II and ^{D}Naram-Sin.

Middle Bronze II (c. 1820-1550 BC). By the time of Babylon ruler Sin-Muballit (c. 1813–1792 BC), father of Hammurabi, Kish was firmly under the control of Babylon and would stay that way until the waning days of the First Dynasty of Babylon. The rulers of Babylon at its peak of power, Hammurabi and Samsu-iluna, are known to have done extensive construction at Kish, including rebuilding the city wall. By this time, the eastern settlement at Hursagkalama had become viewed as a distinct city, and it was probably not included in the walled area.

At some period or periods within the Old Babylonian period, Kish was under the control of a series of rulers generally called the Manana Dynasty. Most of what is known comes from two illicitly excavated archive thought to be from the town of Damrum, near Kish. These rulers include Iawian, Halium, Abdi-Erah, Manana, and four others. Several year names of Iawium are known including "Year Sumu-ditana died". Samsu-Ditana was the last ruler of the First Dynasty of Babylon. One ruler, Ashduniarim is known from a long inscription on a clay foundation cone found at Kish.

"Ašdũni-iarīm, the mighty man, beloved of Ištar, favored by Zababa, king of Kiš, when the world quarters four became hostile to me, for eight years battle I waged, and in the eighth year my opponent to clay indeed turned. ... "

=== Late Bronze Age ===
The succeeding Kassite dynasty moved the capital from Babylon to Dur-Kurigalzu and Kish was diminished. There is some evidence of Kassite activity in Kish.

=== Iron Age and later ===
Afterwards Kish appears to have significantly declined in importance, as it is only mentioned in a few documents from the later second millennium BC. During the Neo-Assyrian and Neo-Babylonian periods, Kish is mentioned more frequently in texts. However, by this time, Kish proper (Tell al-Uhaymir) had been almost completely abandoned, and the settlement which texts from this period call "Kish" was probably Hursagkalama (Tell Ingharra).

After the Achaemenid period, Kish completely disappears from the historical record; however, archaeological evidence indicates that the town remained in existence for a long time thereafter. Although the site at Tell al-Uhaymir was mostly abandoned, Tell Ingharra was revived during the Parthian period, growing into a sizeable town with a large mud-brick fortress. During the Sasanian period, the site of the old city was completely abandoned in favor of a string of connected settlements spread out along both sides of the Shatt en-Nil canal. This last incarnation of Kish prospered under Sasanian and then Islamic rule, before being finally abandoned during the later years of the Abbasid Caliphate (750–1258).

== Archaeology ==
Kish is located 12 km (7.5 mi) east of the ancient city of Babylon and 80 km (50 mi) south of modern Baghdad. The Kish archaeological site is an oval area roughly 8 by 3 km (5 by 2 mi), transected into east and west sections by the dry former bed of the Euphrates River, encompassing around 40 mounds scattered over an area of about 24 square kilometers, the largest being Uhaimir and Ingharra.

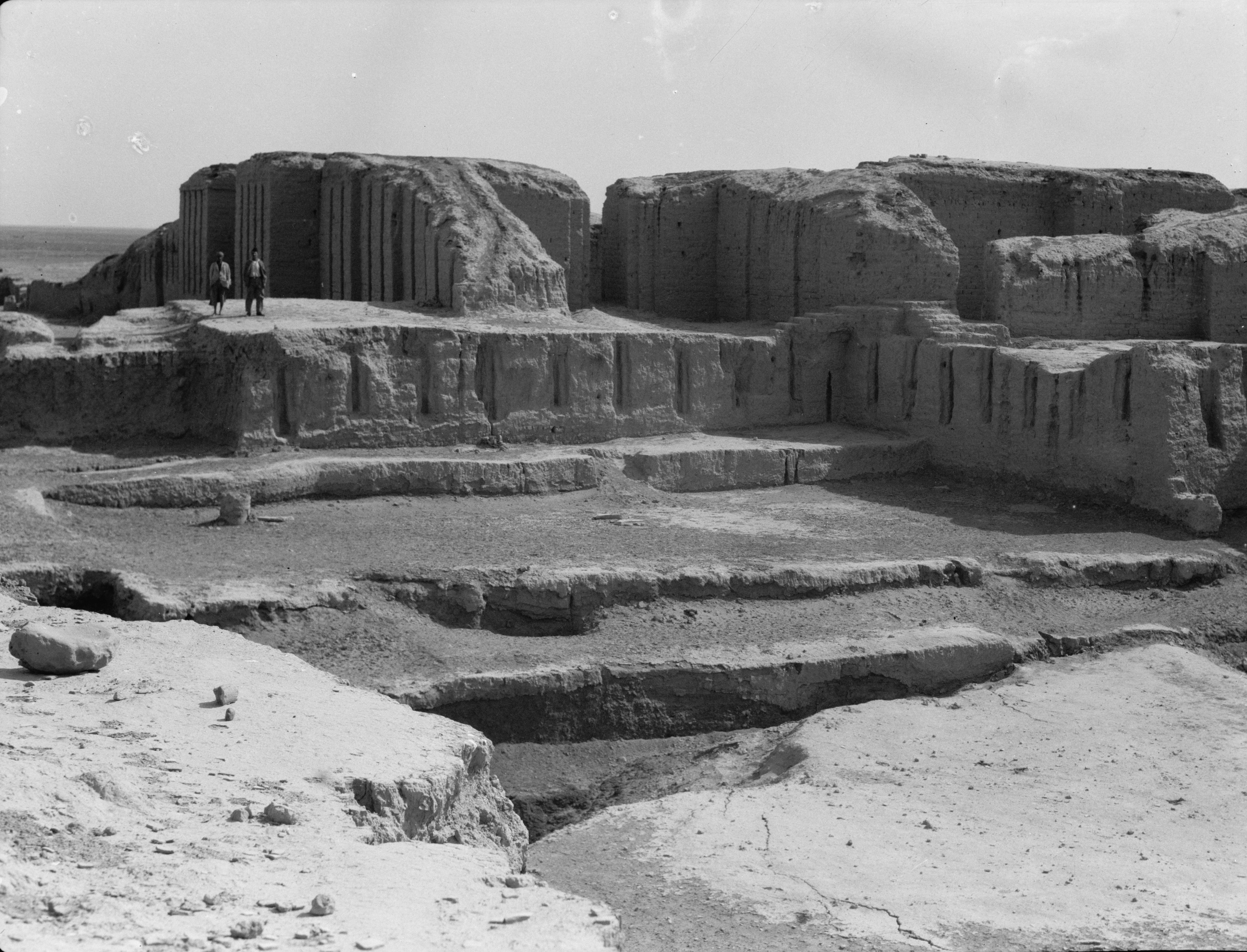
Iraq. Kish. (Tel-Uhaimir). Ruins of Kish at time of excavation

After irregularly excavated tablets began appearing at the beginning of the twentieth century, François Thureau-Dangin identified the site as being Kish. Those tablets ended up in a variety of museums. Because of its close proximity to Babylon (of which early explorers believed it was part) the site was visited by a number of explorers and travelers in the 19th century, some involving excavation, most notably by the foreman of Hormuzd Rassam who dug there with a crew of 20 men for a number of months. Austen Henry Layard and also Julius Oppert dug some trenches there in early 1852 though the finds were lost in the Qurnah Disaster. None of this early work was published. The name of the site as Kish was determined by George Smith in 1872 based on an inscribed brick of Adad-apla-iddina which had been discovered 60 years before. A large number of looted cuneiform tablets from Kish appeared on the antiquities market beginning in 1910. A French archaeological team under Henri de Genouillac excavated at Tell Uhaimir for three months in January 1912, finding some 1,400 Old Babylonian tablets which were distributed to the Istanbul Archaeology Museum and the Louvre. He also excavated at a Neo-Babylonian monumental building on Tell Ingharra. At Tell Bander he uncovered Parthian materials.

Later, a joint Field Museum and University of Oxford team under Stephen Langdon excavated from 1923 to 1933, with the recovered materials split between Chicago and the Ashmolean Museum at Oxford. Seventeen different mounds were excavated but the main focus of the excavations was at Tell Ingharra and Tell Uhaimir. The actual excavations at Tell Uhaimir were led initially by E. MacKay and later by L. C. Watelin. Work on the faunal and flora remains was conducted by Henry Field. Even by the standards of the day, the documentation of this excavation (findspots provenance etc.), were sorely lacking. This was compounded by the death of the principals within a few years and the beginning of World War II. In recent decades there has been a major effort to recreate the data from all the old field notes and finds. A bone awl from Phase 2 in the YWN area, the transition between Early Dynastic and Akkadian periods, was accelerator radiocarbon dated to 2471–2299 BC (3905 ± 27 C14 years BP).

A surface survey of Kish and the area around it was conducted in 1966–1967. It showed that there were villages at Uhaimir and Ingharra in the Ubaid and Protoliterate periods. These expanded into two cites in ED I and reached a peak in Ed III with Ingharra becoming the larger city at that time. The site was lightly occupied in the Akkadian period with modest towns on Ingharra and Mound W. During Ur III, Isin-Larsa, and Old Babylonian times there was a revival mostly centered around Uhaimir. The later half of the 2nd millennium BC showed light occupation, all on Mound W. In the Neo-Babylonian period the rivercourse shifted from north to west, with Uhaimir having a large temple with associated fort, a major temple on Ingharra, and a major town on Mound W. The Achaemenid/Seleucid settlement was limited to the western end of Uhaimir. The Parthian and Sassanian periods showed light occupation, except for Tell Bandar. As part of this survey soundings were made at Umm-el-Jir (the site named Umm el-Jerab that Oriental Institute had found Old Akkadian tablets in 1932) 27 kilometers from Kish.

More recently, a Japanese team from the Kokushikan University led by Hideo Fuji and Ken Matsumoto excavated at Tell Uhaimir in 1989–89, 2000, and 2001. The final season lasted only one week. Work was focused mainly on Tell A with some time spent at the plano-convex building.

In February 2022 Iraqi archaeaologists conducted Ground Penetrating Radar and Electrical Resistivity scans of a test 30 meter by 30 meter section at Kish.

In the Chicago expedition to Kish in 1923–1933, several other sections are included:

- Tell Ingharra – Twin ziggurats and Neo-Babylonian Temple Complex.
- Area P: Located in the Northern part of Kish which the Plano-convex Building resided
- Mound A, which includes a palace and a cemetery
- Tell H, identified roughly as "The Sasanian Settlement"

=== Tell Uhaimir ===
This site consists of three subtells (T, X, and Z). Tell Z was the location of one of the main ziggurats and where temples had been built and rebuilt from the Old Babylonian to the Neo-Babylonian periods. At Tell X a 1st Millennium BC fort was uncovered and at Tell T some Old Babylonian structures were found. Between Uhaimir and Ingharra are three smaller tells and further east Tell W where Neo-Assyrian tablets as well as an entire Neo-Babylonian archive was found consisting of about 1000 tablets.

=== Tell Ingharra (Ḫursaĝkalama) ===
Located in the eastern side of the ancient Kish, Tell Ingharra was extensively explored during the Chicago excavation and provided the best known archaeological sequence in the 3rd millennium BC site. The site consists of several subtells (A, B, D, E, F, G, H, and Tell Bandar which is made up of Tells C and V). In particular, the 1923 excavation concentrated heavily on mound E with its twin ziggurats, while the roughly 130 meter square Neo-Babylonian temple, built on an Early Dynastic plano-copnvex platform, was one of the two buildings that was properly described in a published report.

The twin ziggurats were built of small plano-convex bricks in a herringbone fashion on the summit of Tell Ingharra. The larger one is located on the south-west side of the temple and the smaller one on the south-east side. The excavation report mainly focused on the larger ziggurat while there had been only one report on the smaller one by Mackay. Based on the findings from the larger ziggurat, it is suggested that the structures were built at the end of the Early Dynastic IIIa period to commemorate the city. The fascination of the ziggurats was interesting to the excavators as it was the only Early Dynastic structure that was not destroyed or obscured by later reconstructions, which was why it provided valuable evidence of that time period.

As for the temple complex, the findings of the temple had determined that the mound was part of the city of Hursagkalama. It was used as an active religious centre until after 482 BC. They also had identified the builder as Nabonidus or Nebuchadnezzar II based on the bricks with inscriptions and barrel cylinder fragments reported in the temple.

An Early Dynastic I/IIIa cemetery extended to the south towards Mound A with a number of high status graves containing multiple burials and carts drawn by equids or bovids and are considered as predecessors to the royal burials at Ur.

=== Area P ===
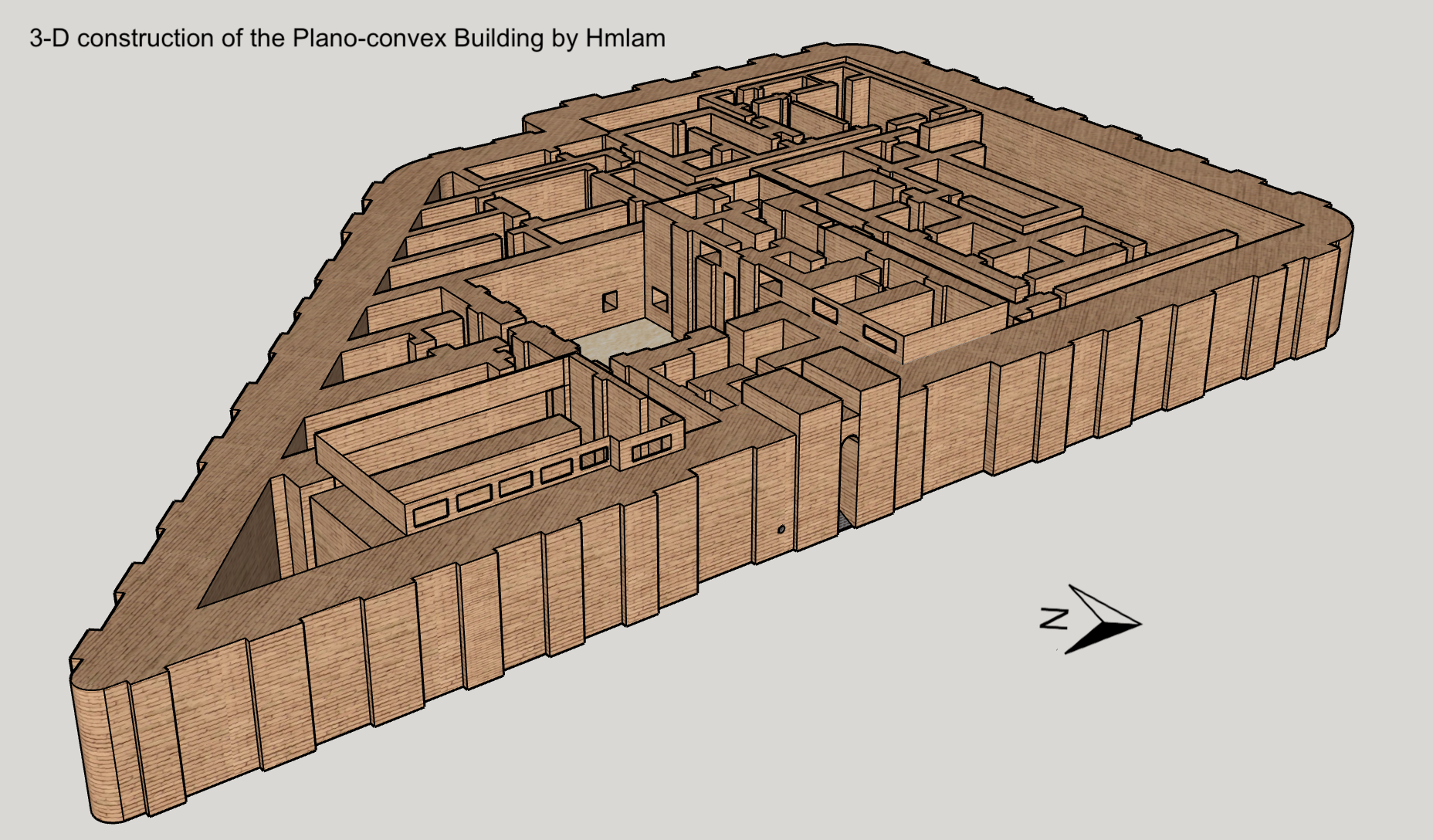
3-D reconstruction of the Plano-convex building (north-east view) by Hmlam

This area, north of tell W, was unearthed during the second excavation season (1923–1924) led by Mackay, which uncovered the 'Plano-convex building' (PCB). But outstanding discoveries in Palace A rapidly overshadowed the contemporary excavation here, and the building remained partially uncovered.

Revealed by its stratigraphy and pottery assemblage was the existence of three distinct architectural phases. The earliest archaeological occupation dates back to the ED II period. Above it, rested the massive ED III construction – the PCB. Multiple rooms in the PCB exhibited layers of ashes and charcoals with arrowheads and copper blades, attested that the PCB suffered significant destruction twice during the late ED III period. After its destruction, the PCB was abandoned. Located above later floors of the PCB were scattered burials during the Akkadian period.

==== The 'Plano-convex building' ====
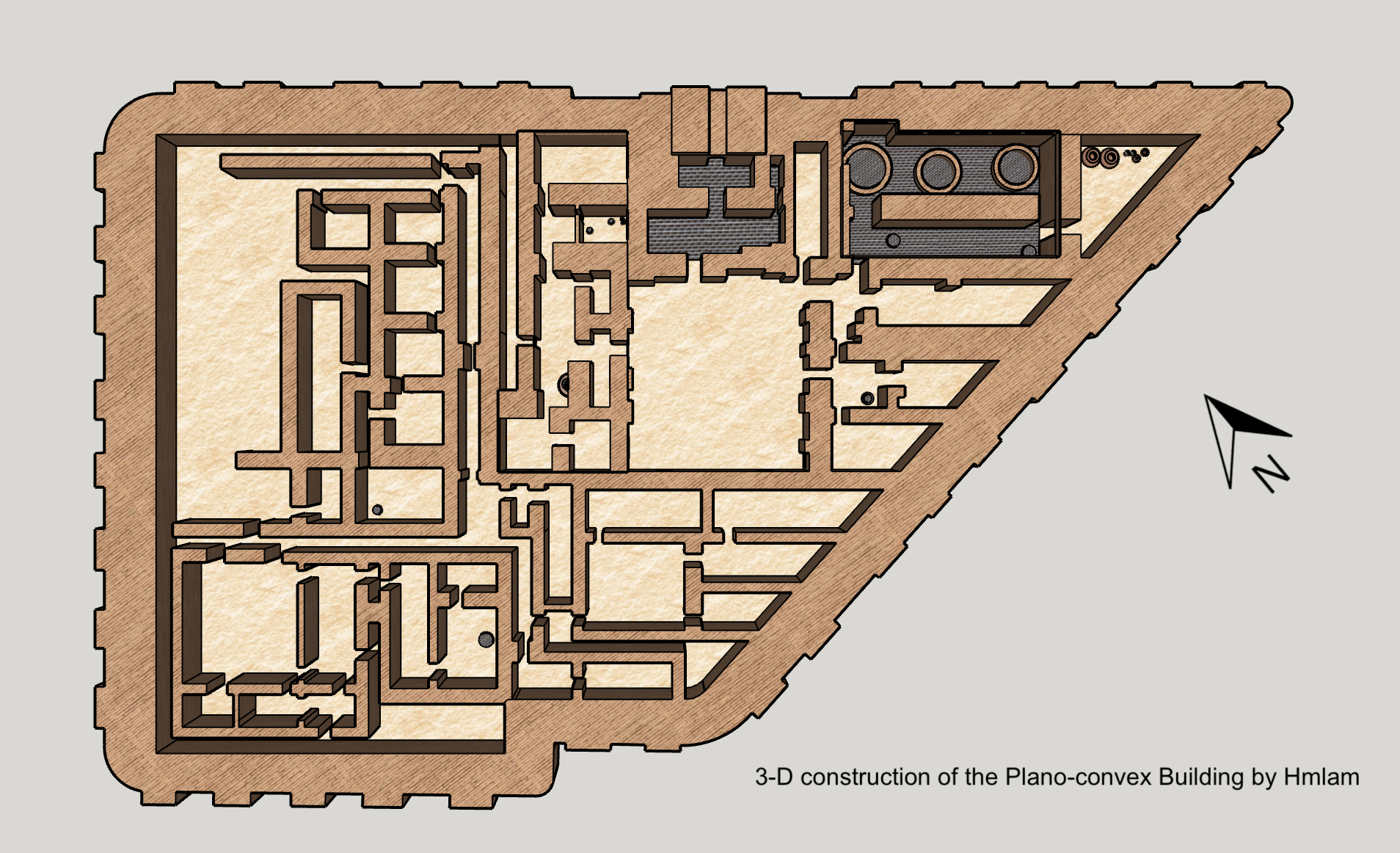
3-D reconstruction of the Plano-convex building (bird's eye view) by Hmlam

The Plano-convex building was a fortified construction built extensively with plano-convex bricks. It displayed the socio-economic dynamics at Kish during the ED III period. No characteristic linking the building to a religious construct. Instead, the Plano-convex building is recognized as a public building associated with the economical production of beer, textile and oil. The PCB might have also housed the administrative center powered by the elites. First recognized by Margueron, scholars have divided the building into four main sectors based on the architectural layout:

- Sector A: Production area
- Sector B: Inconclusive but arguably an administration area
- Sector C: Unknown but exhibit a high degree of segregation
- Sector D: Private, domestic area for housing activities

=== Mound A ===
Mound A, which includes a cemetery and an Early Dynastic III palace, was discovered during 1922–1925 excavations conducted by Ernest Mackay, under the Field Museum and Oxford University. Although it was earlier a part of the Ingharra mounds lying about 70 meters to the north, it is now separated by an alluvial valley. The seals and other artifacts found in the graves, dating back to a later age than the palace, show that the site was used as a cemetery from the end of the Early Dynastic period until the early Akkadian Empire period.

==== The Sumerian Palace ====
The palace, which was unearthed beneath the mound, had fallen into decay and was used as a burial ground during Early Dynastic III. It comprises three sections – the original building, the eastern wing and stairway, and the annex. The original building, which was composed of unbaked plano-convex bricks (23 × 15 × 3.5–6 cm), had extremely thick walls, while the annex, which was added later to the south of the building, had comparatively thinner walls. A 2.30 m wide passage was constructed within the outer wall of the original building to prevent invaders from entering the structure.

The archaeological findings within the palace lack pottery items, the most remarkable among them was a fragment of slate and limestone inlay work, which represents the scene of a king punishing a prisoner.

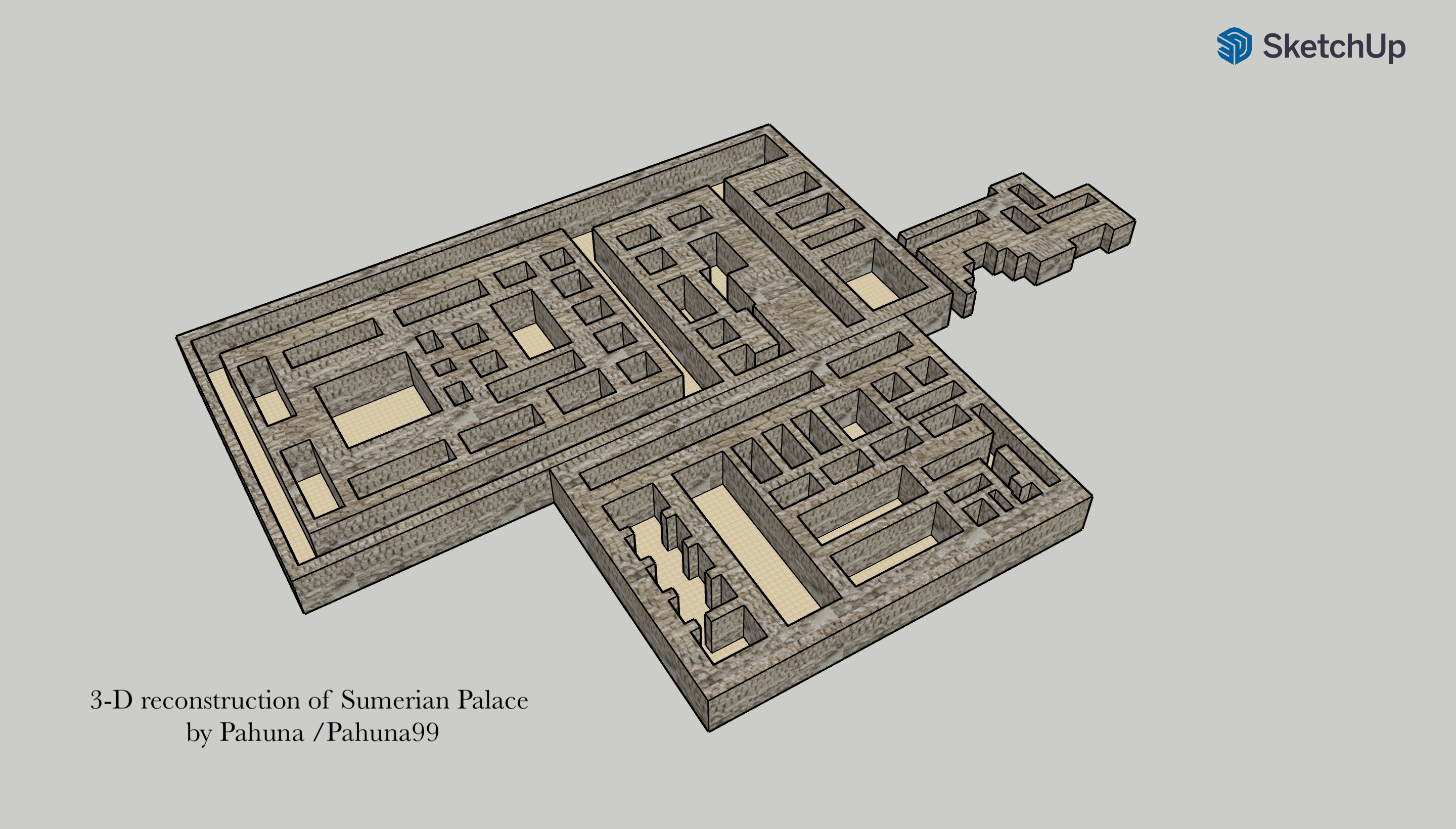
3-D reconstruction of Sumerian Palace (Mound A) by Pahuna/ Pahuna99

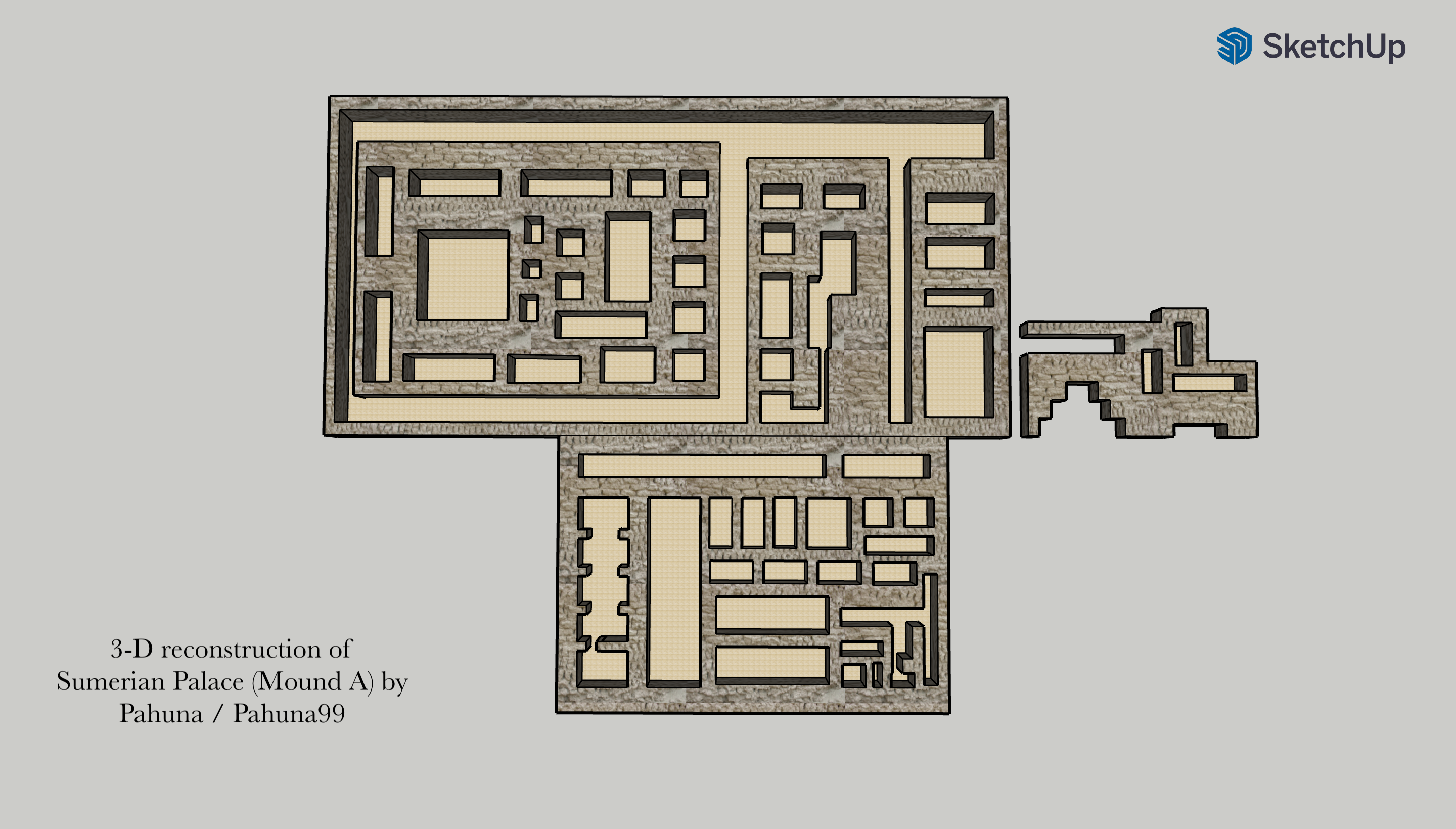
3-D reconstruction of Sumerian Palace (Mound A) by Pahuna/ Pahuna99

=== Tell H ===
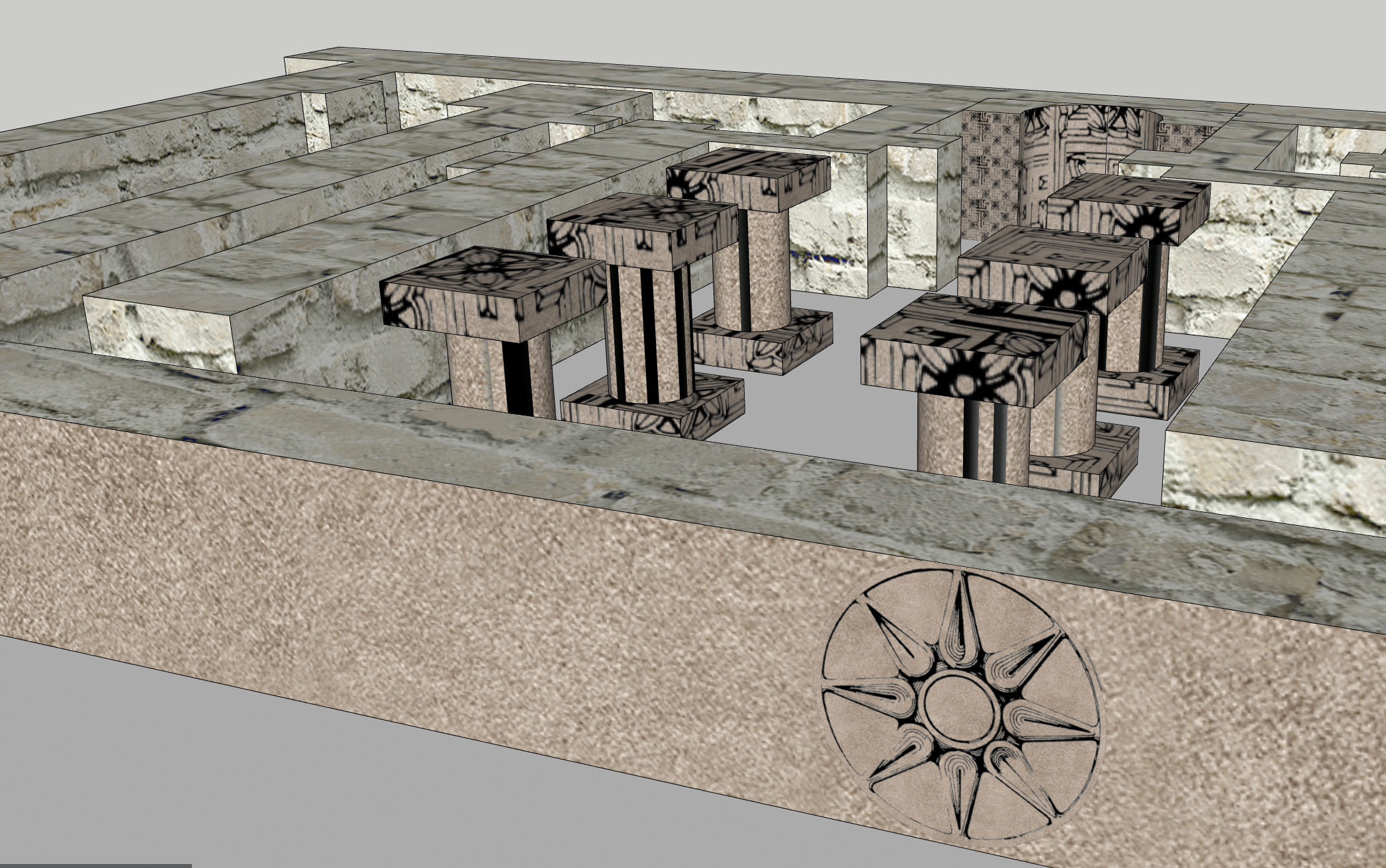
3-D reconstruction of Tell H, SP-2 by OceanOwll

In the 1923–1933 Expedition, Tell H became the focus of its final three seasons (1930–1933). For personal reasons of the excavators, the Kish material in this section remained selective, mainly yielding Sasanian pottery, coins, incantation bowls and so on. The dating of this section crossed a range of periods, with layer upon layer built on the site. Evidence shows that in the Early Dynastic III Period, there once even existed a twin city. Therefore, the city occupies a relatively unsettled presence in chronology. But from the excavation, eight buildings were identified as from the Sasanian period, thus making this place primarily identified as the Sasanian Settlement. Researchers suspect that some of the buildings might function together as a complex serving different purposes, including royal residence, storage, and administration.

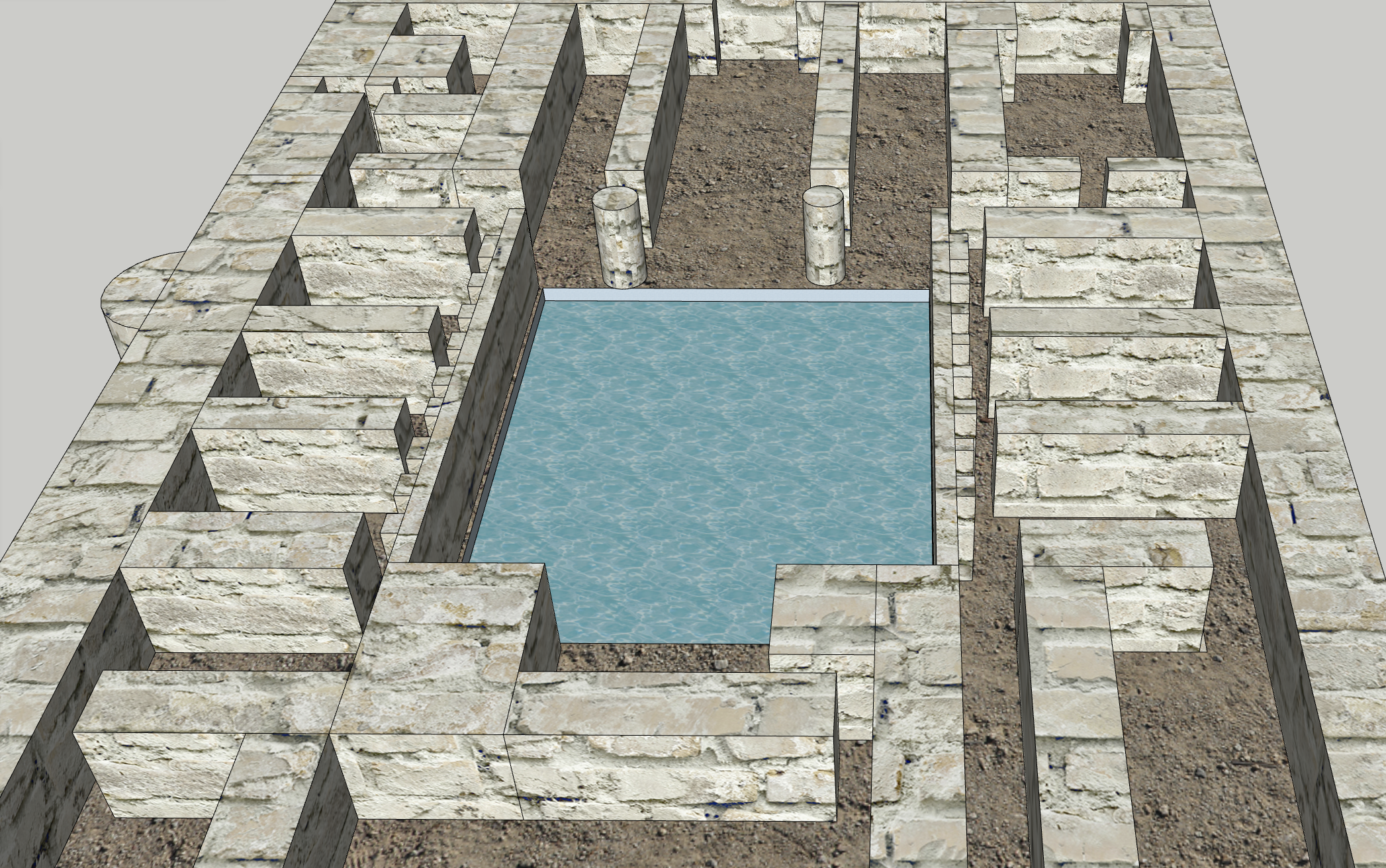
3-D reconstruction of Tell H, SP-3 by OceanOwll

The most prominent finding is the stucco decoration in the first two buildings, while the 1923–1933 team also figured out the floor plan and architectural structure of others. It was partly through these stucco decorations that researchers identified the royal resident to be Bahram V (420–438 AD)—Sasanian kings had their distinctive crowns separately, and the unique crown pattern on stucco served as evidence to support this argument. In Kish, which once functioned as a transfer station between Ctesiphon and Hira, Bahram V built palaces for summer entertainment, which explains why one of the buildings has a huge water tank in the middle, probably functioning to cool down the court in summers. Around Bahram V's palaces, a group of Sasanian people also took residence and developed a system of settlement and commercial activities.

== List of rulers ==
The Sumerian King List (SKL) lists only 39 rulers among four dynasties of Kish. A fifth dynasty is known and it was an Amorite dynasty unnamed on the SKL. The following list should not be considered complete:

| # | Depiction | Ruler | Succession | Epithet | Approx. dates | Notes |
|---|---|---|---|---|---|---|
Early Dynastic I period (c. 2900 – c. 2650 BC)
First dynasty of Kish / Kish I dynasty (c. 2900 – c. 2650 BC)
"After the flood had swept over, and the kingship had descended from heaven, the kingship was in Kish." — Sumerian King List (SKL)
| 1st | | Jushur 𒄑𒃡 | | | fl. c. 2900 BC (1,200 years) | Names before Etana do not appear in any other known source, and their existence is archaeologically unverified; Said on the SKL to have held the title of, "King" of not just Kish; but, to have held the "Kingship" over all of Sumer; Historicity uncertain |
| 2nd | | Kullassina-bel 𒄢𒆷𒍣𒈾𒁁𒂖𒃻 | | | Uncertain (960 years) | The name is believed to be a Kishite phrase meaning, "All of them (were) lord", which may denote a period of no central authority in the early period of Kish; Said on the SKL to have held the title of, "King" of not just Kish; but, to have held the "Kingship" over all of Sumer; Historicity uncertain |
| 3rd | | Nangishlishma 𒄢𒆷𒍣𒈾𒁁𒂖 | | | Uncertain (670 years) | Said on the SKL to have held the title of, "King" of not just Kish; but, to have held the "Kingship" over all of Sumer; Known from the SKL; very little otherwise; Historicity uncertain |
| 4th | | En-tarah-ana 𒂗𒁰𒀭𒈾 | | | Uncertain (420 years) | Said on the SKL to have held the title of, "King" of not just Kish; but, to have held the "Kingship" over all of Sumer; Known from the SKL; very little otherwise; Historicity uncertain |
| 5th | | Babum 𒁀𒁍𒌝 | | | Uncertain (300 years) | The name is believed to be a Kishite word for "gate"; Said on the SKL to have held the title of, "King" of not just Kish; but, to have held the "Kingship" over all of Sumer; Historicity uncertain |
| 6th | | Puannum 𒁍𒀭𒉡𒌝 | | | Uncertain (840 years) | Said on the SKL to have held the title of, "King" of not just Kish; but, to have held the "Kingship" over all of Sumer; Historicity uncertain |
| 7th | | Kalibum 𒂵𒉌𒁍𒌝 | | | Uncertain (960 years) | The name is believed to be a Kishite word for "hound"; Said on the SKL to have held the title of, "King" of not just Kish; but, to have held the "Kingship" over all of Sumer; Historicity uncertain |
| 8th | | Kalumum 𒅗𒇻𒈬𒌝 | | | Uncertain (840 years) | The name is believed to be a Kishite word for "lamb"; Said on the SKL to have held the title of, "King" of not just Kish; but, to have held the "Kingship" over all of Sumer; Historicity uncertain |
| 9th | | Zuqaqip 𒅗𒂵𒄄𒅁 | | | Uncertain (900 years) | The name is believed to be a Kishite word for "scorpion"; Said on the SKL to have held the title of, "King" of not just Kish; but, to have held the "Kingship" over all of Sumer; Historicity uncertain |
| 10th | | Atab 𒀉𒋰 | | | Uncertain (600 years) | Said on the SKL to have held the title of, "King" of not just Kish; but, to have held the "Kingship" over all of Sumer; Known from the SKL; very little otherwise; Historicity uncertain |
| 11th | | Mashda 𒈦𒆕𒆤 | Son of Atab | | Uncertain (840 years) | The name is believed to be a Kishite word for "gazelle"; Said on the SKL to have held the title of, "King" of not just Kish; but, to have held the "Kingship" over all of Sumer; Historicity uncertain |
| 12th | | Arwium 𒅈𒉿𒌑𒌝 | Son of Mashda | | Uncertain (720 years) | The name is believed to be a Kishite word for "male gazelle"; Said on the SKL to have held the title of, "King" of not just Kish; but, to have held the "Kingship" over all of Sumer; Historicity uncertain |
| 13th | | Etana 𒂊𒋫𒈾 | | "the shepherd, who ascended to heaven and consolidated all the foreign countries" | reigned c. 2800 BC (1,500 years) | Known from the Babylonian Myth of Etana; Said on the SKL to have held the title of, "King" of not just Kish; but, to have held the "Kingship" over all of Sumer; Historicity uncertain |
| 14th | | Balih 𒁀𒇷𒄴 | Son of Etana | | Uncertain (400 years) | Said on the SKL to have held the title of, "King" of not just Kish; but, to have held the "Kingship" over all of Sumer; Known from the SKL; very little otherwise; Historicity uncertain |
| 15th | | En-me-nuna 𒂗𒈨𒉣𒈾 | | | Uncertain (660 years) | Said on the SKL to have held the title of, "King" of not just Kish; but, to have held the "Kingship" over all of Sumer; Known from the SKL; very little otherwise; Historicity uncertain |
| 16th | | Melem-Kish 𒈨𒉈𒆧𒆠 | Son of En-me-nuna | | Uncertain (900 years) | Said on the SKL to have held the title of, "King" of not just Kish; but, to have held the "Kingship" over all of Sumer; Known from the SKL; very little otherwise; Historicity uncertain |
"1,560 are the years of the dynasty of En-me-nuna." — SKL
| 17th | | Barsal-nuna 𒁇𒊩𒉣𒈾 | Son of En-me-nuna | | Uncertain (1,200 years) | His name may have meant sheep of the prince. Barsal means sheep; Said on the SKL to have held the title of, "King" of not just Kish; but, to have held the "Kingship" over all of Sumer; Historicity uncertain |
| 18th | | Zamug 𒁾 | Son of Barsal-nuna | | Uncertain (140 years) | Said on the SKL to have held the title of, "King" of not just Kish; but, to have held the "Kingship" over all of Sumer; Known from the SKL; very little otherwise; Historicity uncertain |
| 19th | | Tizqar 𒋾𒄑𒃼 | Son of Zamug | | Uncertain (305 years) | Said on the SKL to have held the title of, "King" of not just Kish; but, to have held the "Kingship" over all of Sumer; Known from the SKL; very little otherwise; Historicity uncertain |
| 20th | | Ilku 𒅋𒆪𒌑 | | | Uncertain (900 years) | Said on the SKL to have held the title of, "King" of not just Kish; but, to have held the "Kingship" over all of Sumer; Known from the SKL; very little otherwise; Historicity uncertain |
| 21st | | Iltasadum 𒅋𒋫𒊓𒁺𒌝 | | | Uncertain (1,200 years) | Said on the SKL to have held the title of, "King" of not just Kish; but, to have held the "Kingship" over all of Sumer; Known from the SKL; very little otherwise; Historicity uncertain |
| 22nd | | En-me-barage-si 𒂗𒈨𒁈𒄄𒋛 | | "who made the land of Elam submit" | r. c. 2750 BC (900 years) | Historicity certain; The earliest ruler on the SKL confirmed independently from epigraphical evidence and can be historically verified with archaeology; temp. of Dumuzid of Uruk |
| 23rd | | Aga 𒀝𒂵 | Son of En-me-barage-si | | r. c. 2700 BC (625 years) | Son of En-me-barage-si; Historicity certain; temp. of Gilgamesh of Uruk |
"1,525 are the years of the dynasty of En-me-barage-si. 23 kings; they ruled for 24,510 years, 3 months, and 3½ days. Then Kish was defeated and the kingship was taken to Eanna (Uruk)." — SKL
| # | Depiction | Ruler | Succession | Epithet | Approx. dates | Notes |
Early Dynastic II period (c. 2650 – c. 2550 BC)
| | | Munushushumgal(Munus+Ušumgallu) 𒊩𒃲𒁔 | | | Uncertain; this ruler may have fl. c. 2900 – c. 2500 BC sometime during the ED I, II, and/or IIIa period(s) | Historicity certain; Father of a king; Possibly a king himself |
Early Dynastic IIIa period (c. 2550 – c. 2500 BC)
| | | Lugalmen | | | Uncertain; this ruler may have fl. c. 2700 – c. 2500 BC sometime during the ED II and/or IIIa period(s) | Historicity certain |
| | | Lugalutu 𒈗𒌓 | | | Uncertain; this ruler may have fl. c. 2600 – c. 2500 BC sometime during the ED IIIa period | Historicity certain; A king of Kish |
| | | Menunesi | | | Uncertain; this ruler may have fl. c. 2600 – c. 2500 BC sometime during the EDIIIa period | Historicity certain; temp. of Lumma |
| | | Uhub 𒌑𒄸 | | | r. c. 2570 BC | Historicity certain; Known from vase fragments bearing the title "Governor of Kish" |
| | | Mesilim 𒈨𒁲 | | | r. c. 2550 BC | Historicity certain; temp. of Lugalshaengur of Lagash |
| # | Depiction | Ruler | Succession | Epithet | Approx. dates | Notes |
Early Dynastic IIIb period (c. 2500 – c. 2350 BC)
Second dynasty of Kish / Kish II dynasty (c. 2500 – c. 2430 BC)
"Then Awan was defeated and the kingship was taken to Kish." — SKL
| 1st | | Susuda 𒁻𒋢𒆳𒊒𒁕 | | "the fuller" | r. c. 2500 BC (201 years) | Said on the SKL to have held the title of, "King" of not just Kish; but, to have held the "Kingship" over all of Sumer; Known from the SKL; very little otherwise; Historicity uncertain |
| | | Aya'anzud 𒀀𒀭𒅎𒂂𒄷 | | | Uncertain; these two rulers may have fl. c. 2500 – c. 2470 BC sometime during the EDIIIb period. | Historicity certain.; temp. of Ur-Nanshe of Lagash |
| | | Ennail 𒂗𒈾𒅋 | | | Uncertain; these two rulers may have fl. c. 2500 – c. 2470 BC sometime during the EDIIIb period. | Historicity certain; temp. of Akurgal of Lagash |
| | | Zuzu 𒍪𒍪 | | | r. c. 2470 BC | Historicity certain; Originally from Akshak; temp. of Eannatum of Lagash |
| 2nd | | Dadasig 𒁕𒁕𒋝 | | | Uncertain (81 years) | Said on the SKL to have held the title of, "King" of not just Kish; but, to have held the "Kingship" over all of Sumer; Known from the SKL; very little otherwise; Historicity uncertain |
| 3rd | | Mamagal 𒈣𒈣𒃲 | | "the boatman" | Uncertain (360 years) | Said on the SKL to have held the title of, "King" of not just Kish; but, to have held the "Kingship" over all of Sumer; Known from the SKL; very little otherwise; Historicity uncertain |
| 4th | | Kalbum 𒅗𒀠𒁍𒌝 | Son of Mamagal | | Uncertain (195 years) | Said on the SKL to have held the title of, "King" of not just Kish; but, to have held the "Kingship" over all of Sumer; Known from the SKL; very little otherwise; Historicity uncertain |
| 5th | | Tuge 𒌆𒂊 | | | Uncertain (300 years) | Said on the SKL to have held the title of, "King" of not just Kish; but, to have held the "Kingship" over all of Sumer; Known from the SKL; very little otherwise; Historicity uncertain |
| 6th | | Men-nuna 𒃞𒉣𒈾 | Son of Tuge | | Uncertain (180 years) | Said on the SKL to have held the title of, "King" of not just Kish; but, to have held the "Kingship" over all of Sumer; Known from the SKL; very little otherwise; Historicity uncertain |
| 7th | | Lugalngu 𒂗𒉈𒀹𒁯 | | | r. c. 2450 BC (290 years) | Said on the SKL to have held the title of, "King" of not just Kish; but, to have held the "Kingship" over all of Sumer; Known from the SKL; very little otherwise; Historicity uncertain |
| | | Ibbi-Ea 𒂗𒉈𒀹𒁯 | | | r. c. 2430 BC (420 years) | Said on the SKL to have held the title of, "King" of not just Kish; but, to have held the "Kingship" over all of Sumer; Known from the SKL; very little otherwise; Historicity uncertain |
"8 kings; they ruled for 3,195 years. Then Kish was defeated and the kingship was taken to Hamazi." — SKL
| # | Depiction | Ruler | Succession | Epithet | Approx. dates | Notes |
Third dynasty of Kish / Kish III dynasty (c. 2430 – c. 2360 BC)
"Then Mari was defeated and the kingship was taken to Kish." — SKL
| 1st | | Kug-Bau 𒆬𒀭𒁀𒌑 | | "the woman tavern-keeper, who made firm the foundations of Kish" | r. c. 2400 BC (100 years) | Historicity uncertain; The only known woman in the SKL; said to have gained independence from En-anna-tum I of Lagash and En-shag-kush-ana of Uruk; contemporary with Puzur-Nirah of Akshak, according to the later Chronicle of the É-sagila; Known from the SKL; very little otherwise |
"1 king; she ruled for 100 years. Then Kish was defeated and the kingship was taken to Akshak." — SKL
| # | Depiction | Ruler | Succession | Epithet | Approx. dates | Notes |
Proto-Imperial period (c. 2350 – c. 2334 BC)
Fourth dynasty of Kish / Kish IV dynasty (c. 2360 – c. 1897 BC)
| 8th | | Enbi-Ishtar 𒂗𒉈𒀹𒁯 | | | Uncertain (290 years) | Historicity certain; Appears on a version of the SKL as one of the last kings of the Kish II dynasty; however, his reign may have immediately preceded that of Ur-Zababa from the Kish III and/or IV dynasty; Said on the SKL to have held the title of "king" of not just Kish; but, all of Sumer |
"Then the reign of Akshak was abolished and the kingship was taken to Kish." — SKL
| 1st | | Puzur-Suen 𒅤𒊭𒀭𒂗𒍪 | Son of Kug-bau | | r. c. 2360 BC (25 years) | Son of Kug-bau; Appears on a version of the SKL as one of the last kings of the Kish III dynasty; Said on the SKL to have held the title of "king" of not just Kish; but, all of Sumer |
| 2nd | | Ur-Zababa 𒌨𒀭𒍝𒂷𒂷 | Son of Puzur-Suen | | r. c. 2340 BC (6 years) | Appears on a version of the SKL as one of the last kings of the Kish III dynasty; Said on the SKL to have held the title of "king" of not just Kish; but, all of Sumer; According to the SKL: Sargon of Akkad was his cup-bearer |
Akkadian period (c. 2334 – c. 2154 BC)
| 3rd | | Zimudar 𒍣𒈬𒁯 | | | Uncertain (30 years) | Said on the SKL to have held the title of, "King" of not just Kish; but, to have held the "Kingship" over all of Sumer; Known from the SKL; very little otherwise; Historicity uncertain |
| 4th | | Usi-watar 𒌑𒍣𒉿𒁯 | Son of Zimudar | | Uncertain (7 years) | Said on the SKL to have held the title of, "King" of not just Kish; but, to have held the "Kingship" over all of Sumer; Known from the SKL; very little otherwise; Historicity uncertain |
| 5th | | Eshtar-muti 𒁹𒁯𒈬𒋾 | | | Uncertain (11 years) | Said on the SKL to have held the title of, "King" of not just Kish; but, to have held the "Kingship" over all of Sumer; Known from the SKL; very little otherwise; Historicity uncertain |
| 6th | | Ishme-Shamash 𒅖𒈨𒀭𒌓 | | | Uncertain (11 years) | Said on the SKL to have held the title of, "King" of not just Kish; but, to have held the "Kingship" over all of Sumer; Known from the SKL; very little otherwise; Historicity uncertain |
| 7th | | Shu-ilishu 𒋗𒉌𒉌𒋗 | | | Uncertain (15 years) | Said on the SKL to have held the title of, "King" of not just Kish; but, to have held the "Kingship" over all of Sumer; Known from the SKL; very little otherwise; Historicity uncertain |
| 8th | | Nanniya 𒈾𒀭𒉌𒅀 | | "the jeweller" | Uncertain (7 years) | Said on the SKL to have held the title of, "King" of not just Kish; but, to have held the "Kingship" over all of Sumer; Known from the SKL; very little otherwise; Historicity uncertain |
"8 kings; they ruled for 485 years. Then the reign of Kish was abolished and the kingship was returned a third time to Uruk." — SKL
| | | Iphur-Kish | | | r. c. 2254 BC | Historicity certain; temp. of Naram-Suen of Akkad; A ruler of Kish who led a northern coalition of ten city-states during the Great Revolt against Naram-Suen |
| # | Depiction | Ruler | Succession | Epithet | Approx. dates | Notes |
Isin-Larsa period (c. 2025 – c. 1763 BC)
Manana dynasty (c. 1897 – c. 1847 BC)
| | | Iawian | | | r. c. 1897 BC | |
| | | Manana | | | r. c. 1888 BC | |
| | | Halium | | | Uncertain | |
| | | Abdi-Erah | | | Uncertain | |
| | | Ahi-marasy | | | Uncertain | |
| | | Naqimum | | | r. c. 1872 BC | |
| | | Sumu-iamutbala | | | r. c. 1855 BC | |
| | | Ashduniarim | | | r. c. 1847 BC | |

== Gallery ==
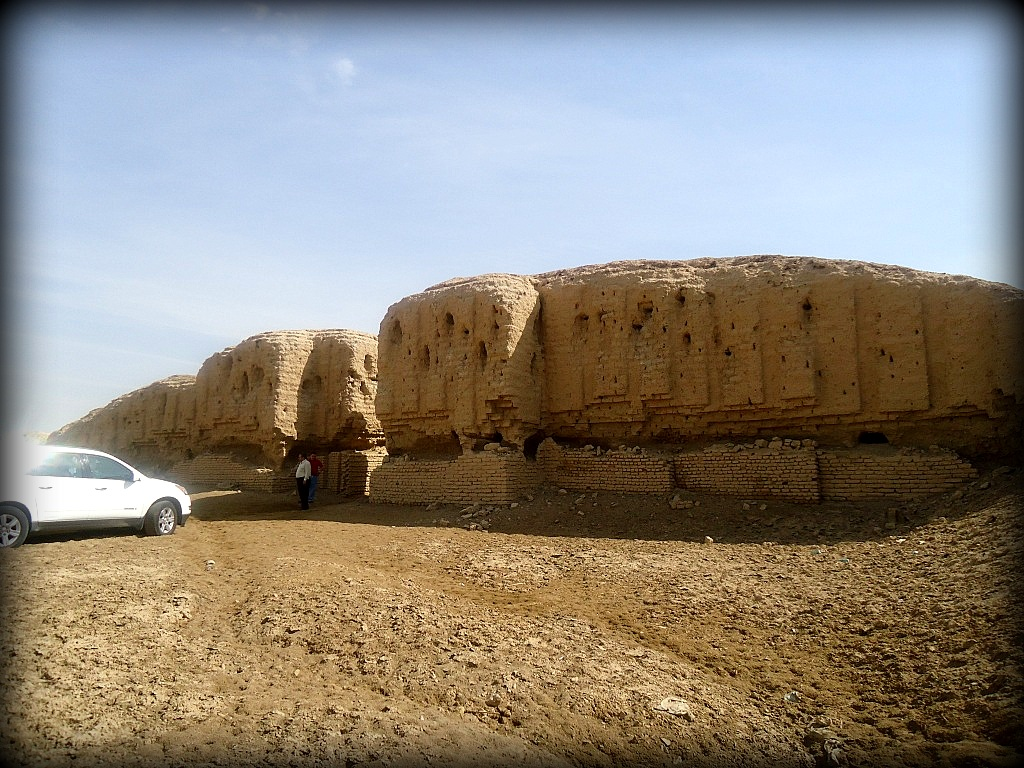
Ruins of a ziggurat at the Sumerian city of Kish. Babel Governorate, Iraq.

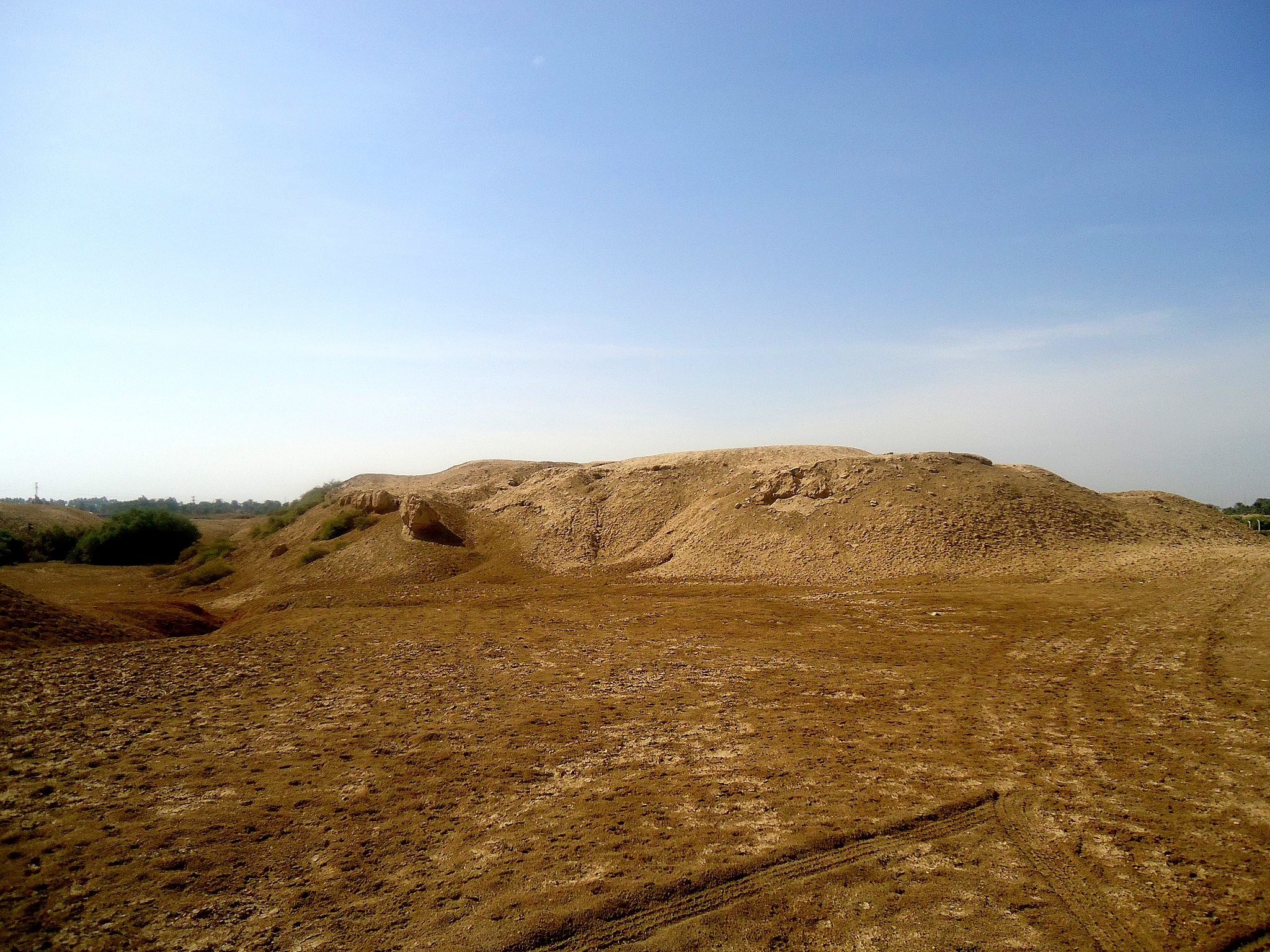
An ancient mound at Kish, Babel Governorate, Iraq

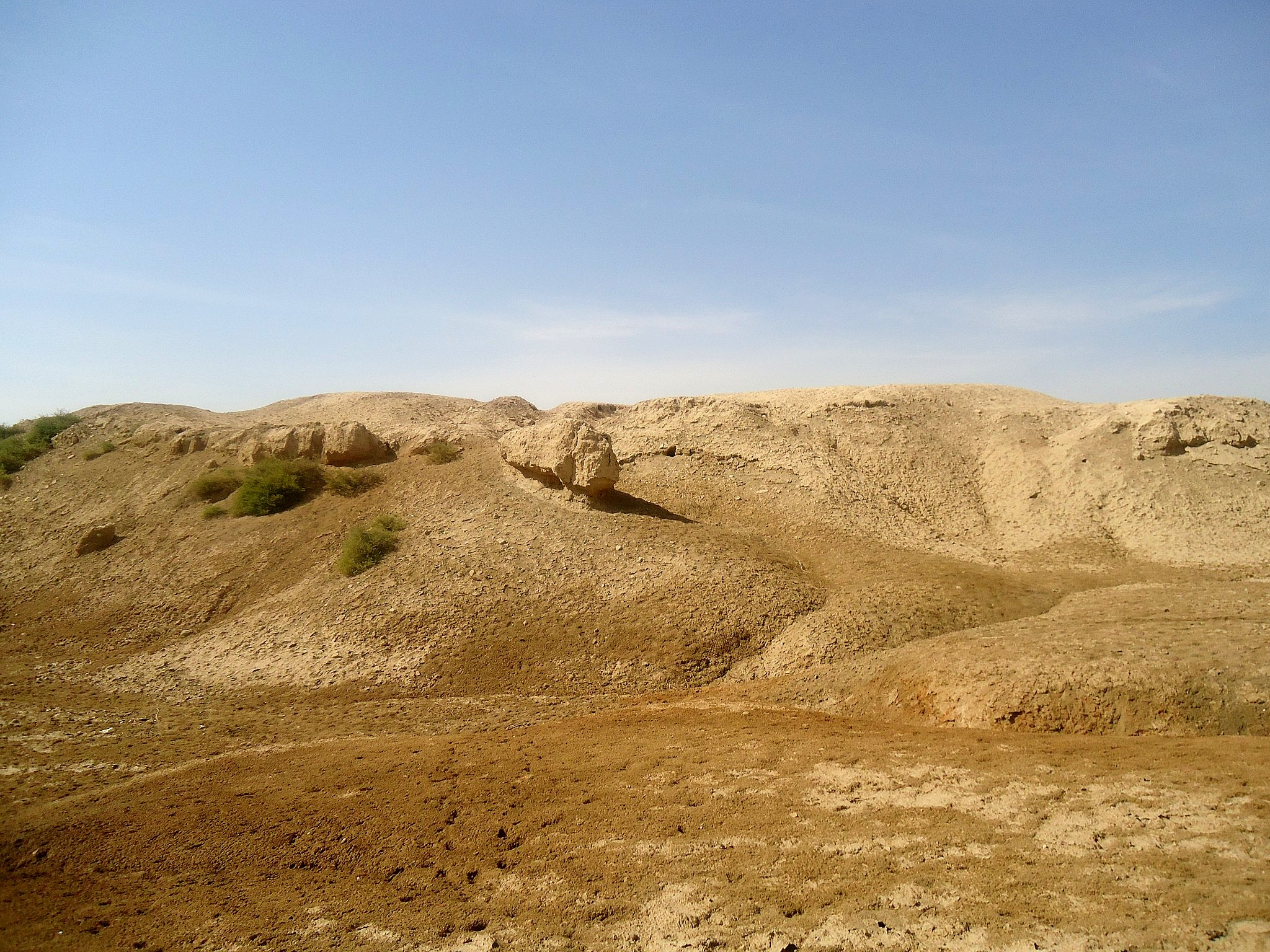
An ancient mound at the city of Kish, Mesopotamia, Babel Governorate, Iraq

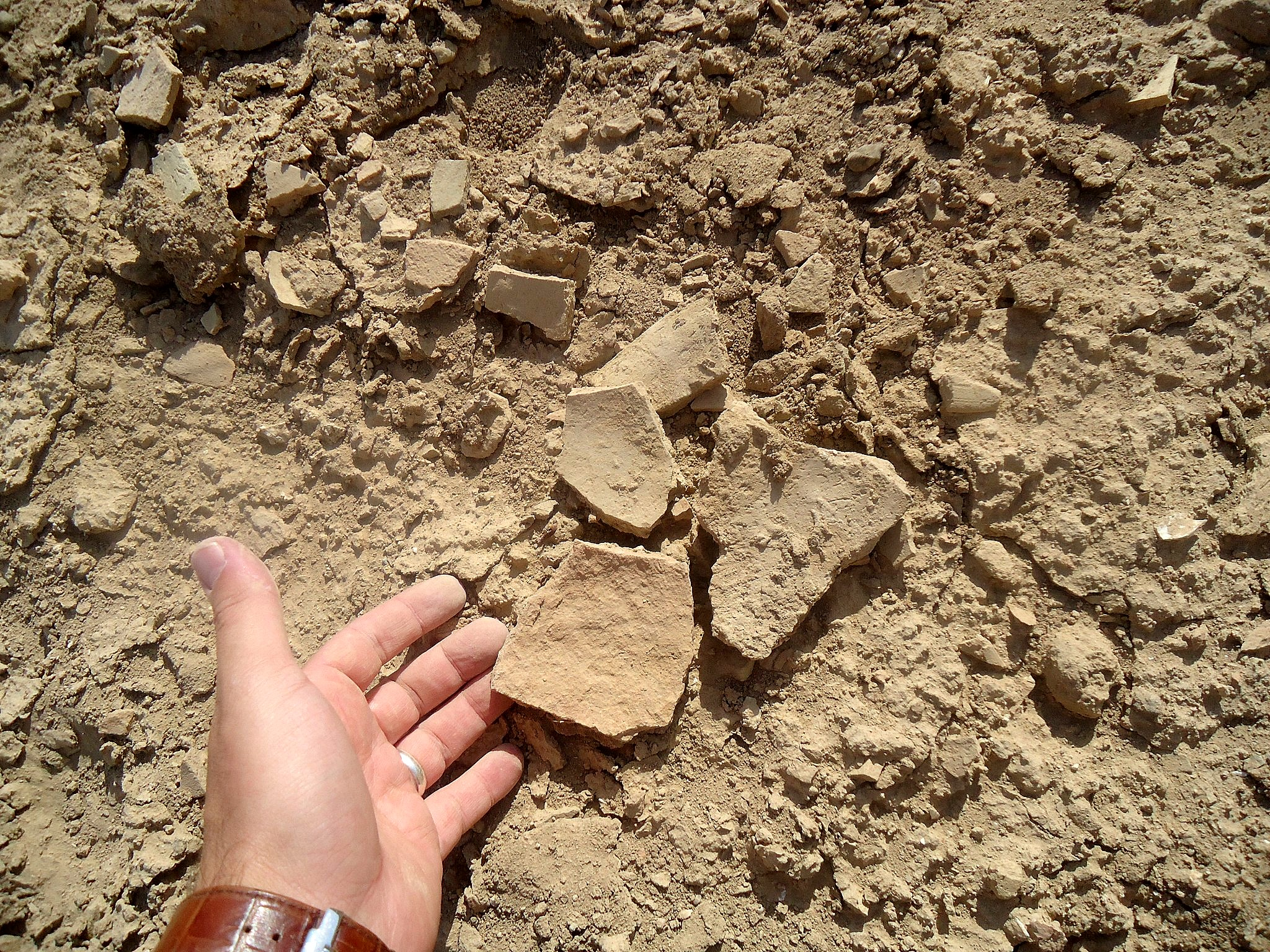
Pottery fragments, illegal exavations at the ancient city of Kish, Tell al-Uhaymir, Iraq

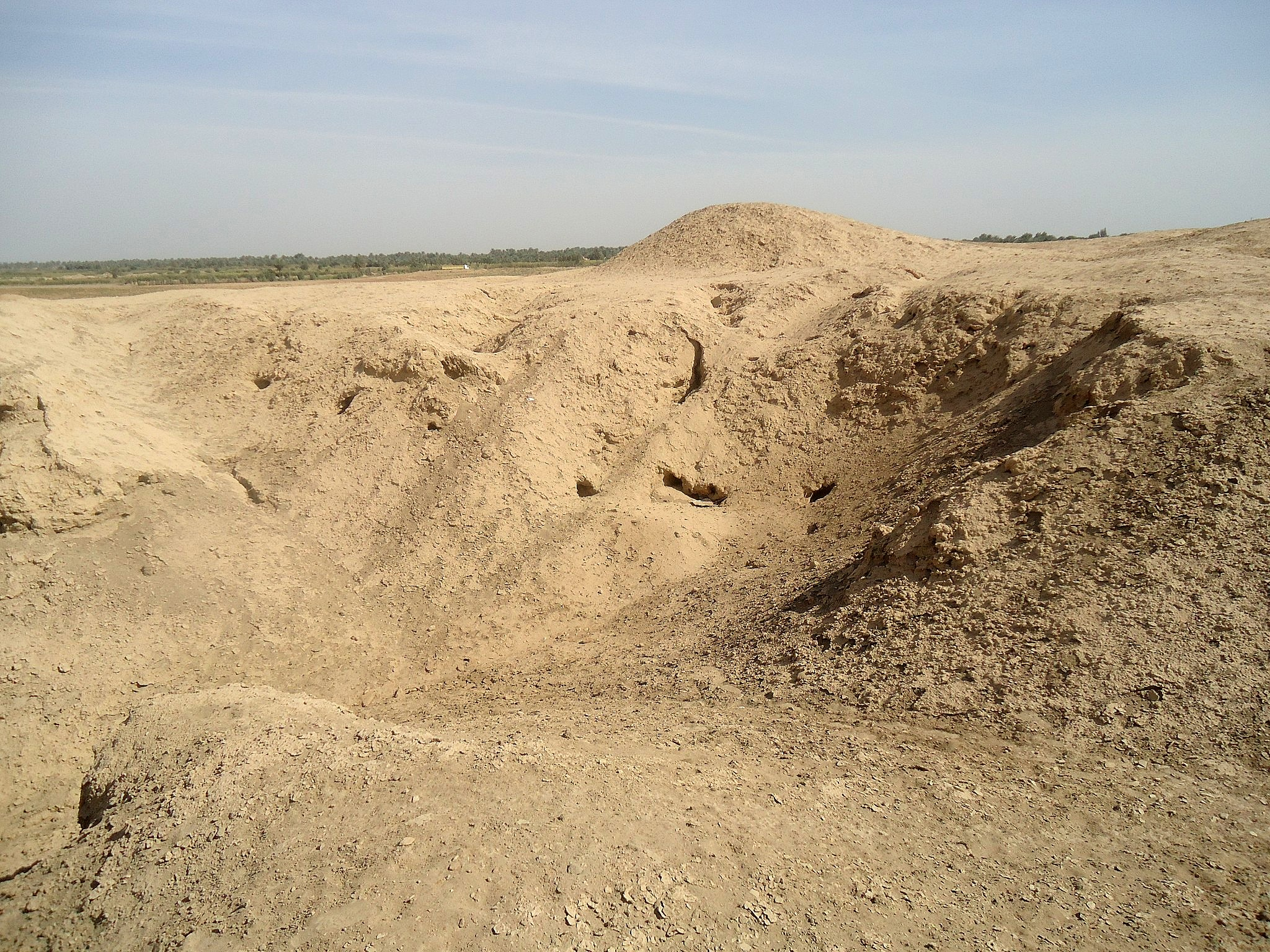
Ancient mound at the city of Kish, Mesopotamia, Babil Governorate, Iraq

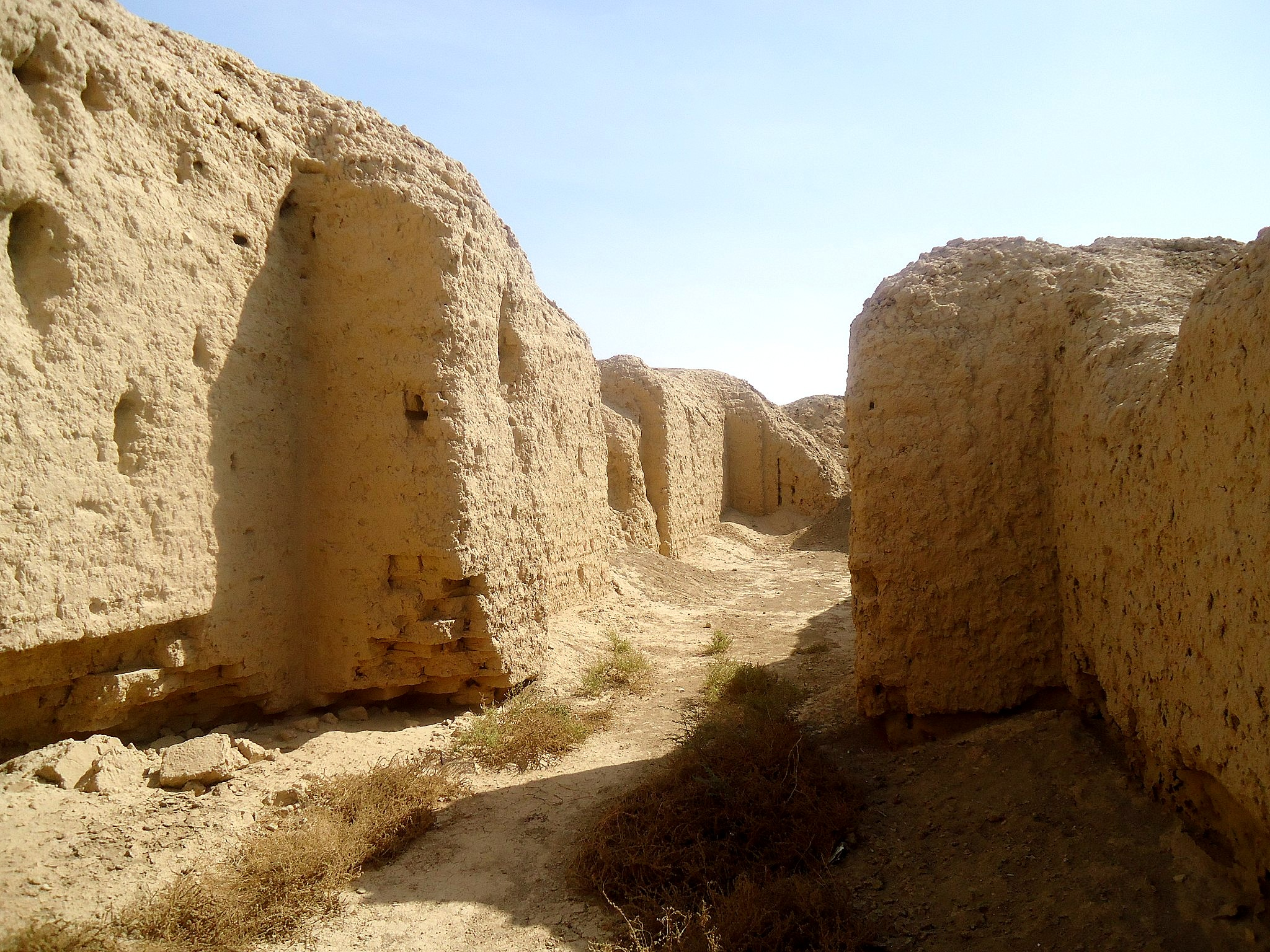
Ruins near the ziggurat of Kish at Tell al-Uhaymir, Mesopotamia, Babel Governorate, Iraq

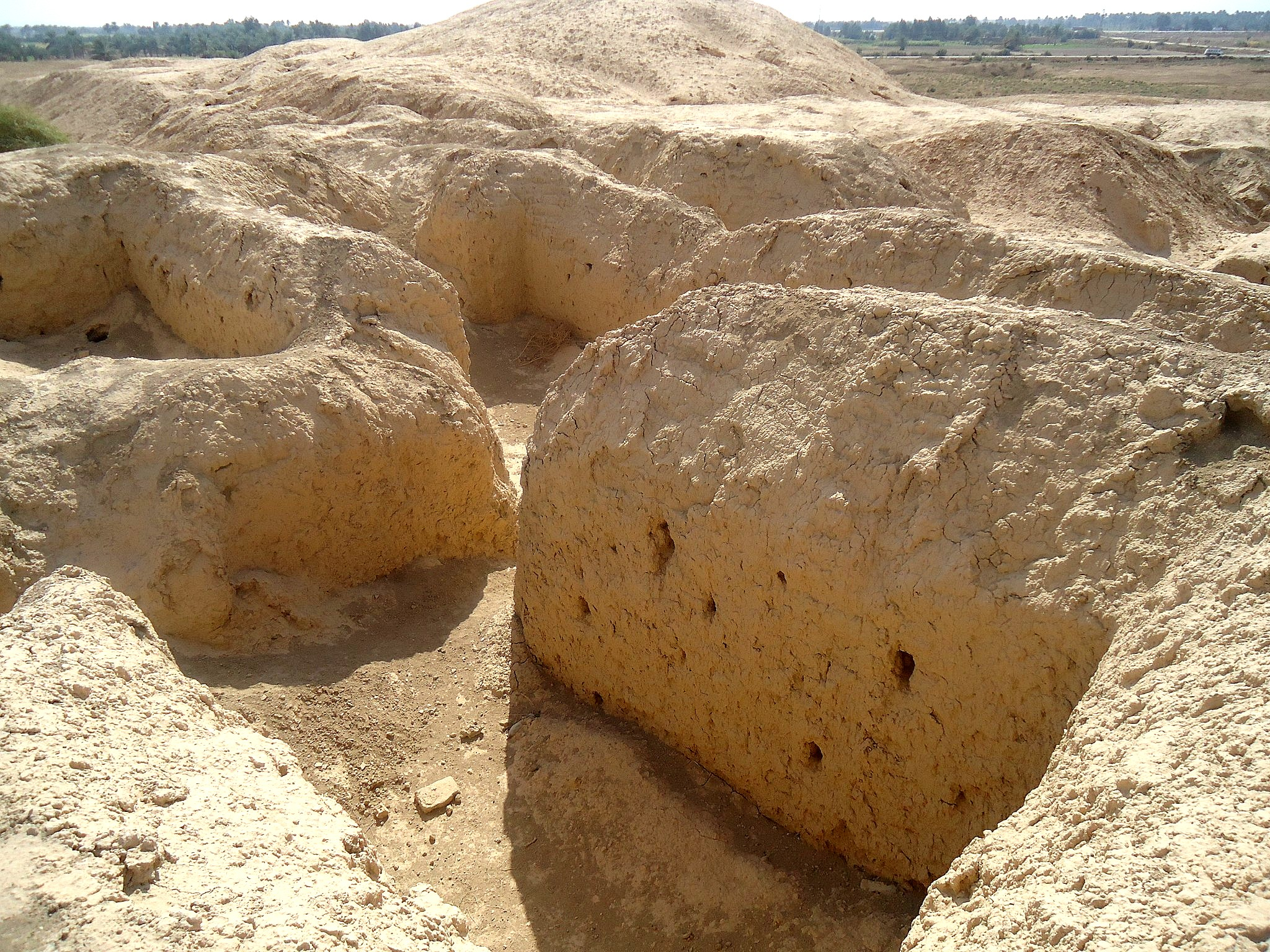
Ruins near the ziggurat of Kish, Tell al-Uhaymir, Babylon Governorate, Iraq

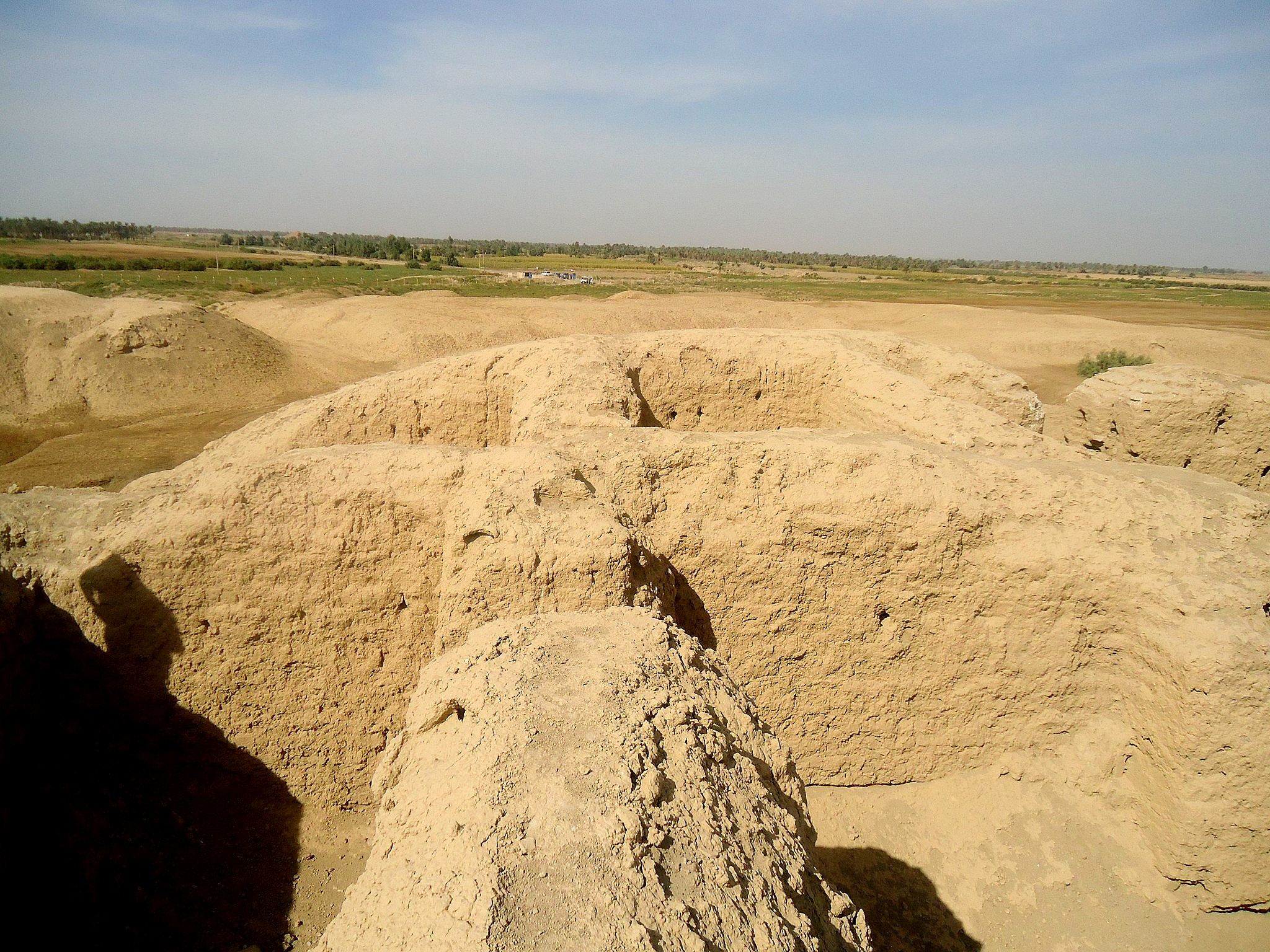
Ruins near the ziggurat of the city of Kish at Tell al-Uhaymir, Babel Governorate, Iraq

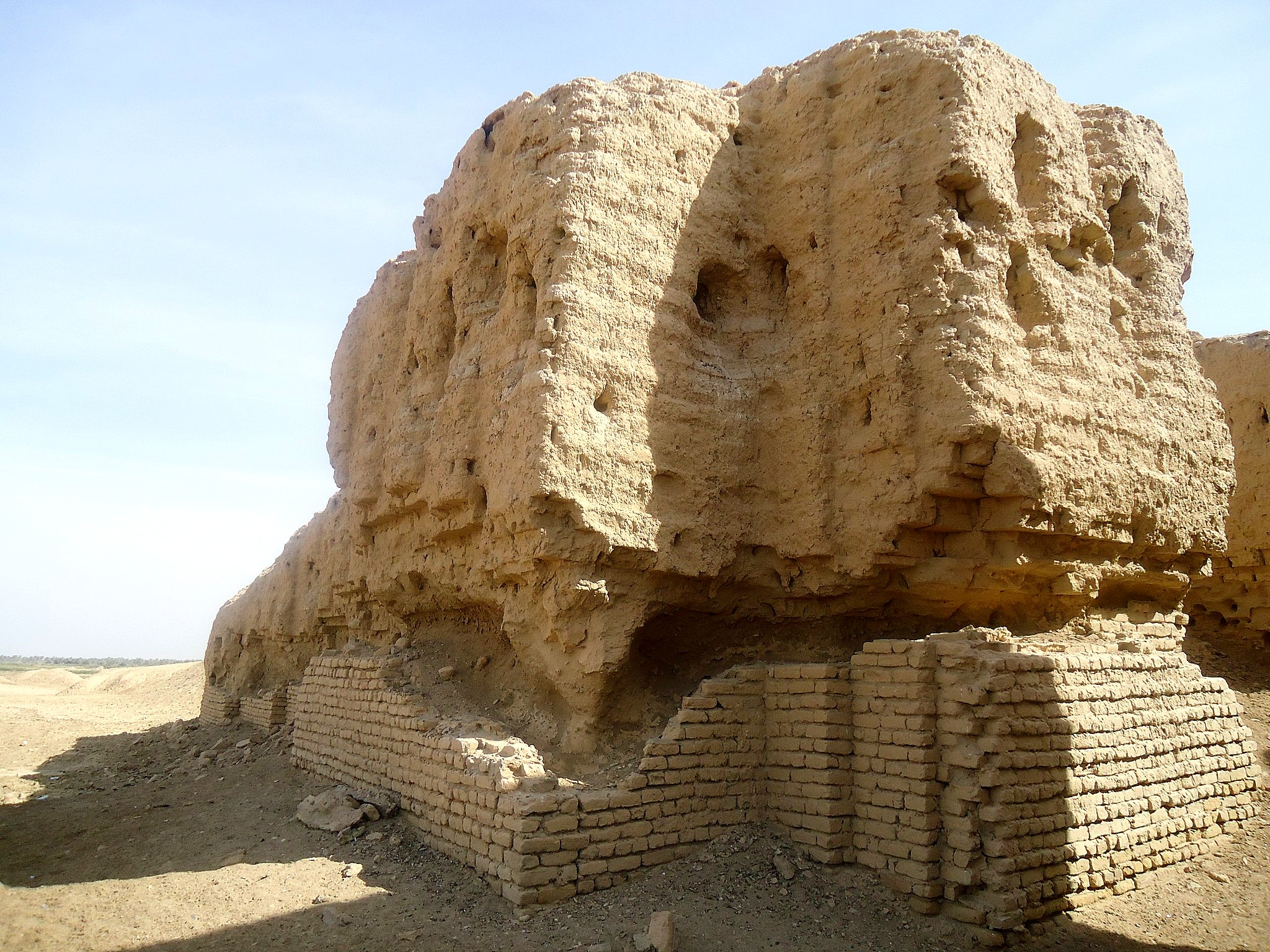
Ruins of the ziggurat of the ancient city of Kish, Tell al-Uhaymir, Mesopotamia, Iraq

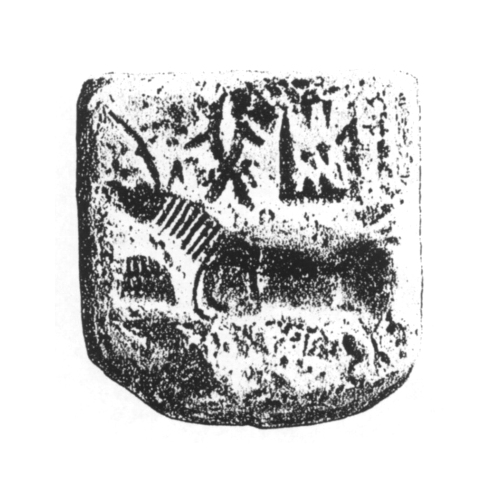
Indus Valley civilisation "Unicorn" seal excavated in Kish, early Sumerian period, c. 3000 BC. An example of ancient Indus-Mesopotamia relations.

== See also ==
- Cities of the Ancient Near East
- Short chronology timeline
