= Kalibum =

Sumerian king of the First Dynasty of Kish

- First appearance: Sumerian King List c. 2000 BC

In-universe information
- Occupation: King of Kish (reigned c. 960 years)

Kalibum of Kish was the seventh Sumerian king in the First Dynasty of Kish, according to the Sumerian king list. This name is written "Ga-lí-bu-um ... normalized as Kalibum", and is believed to be derived from the Akkadian for 'hound'. Kalibum is unlikely to have existed as his name does not appear on texts dating from the period in which he was presumed to have lived (Early Dynastic period).

Regnal titles
Preceded by Puannum	King of Sumer legendary	Succeeded by Kalumum
Preceded by Puannum	Ensi of Kish legendary	Succeeded by Kalumum
