= Arwium =

Sumerian king

- First appearance: Sumerian King List c. 2000 BC

In-universe information
- Occupation: King of Kish (reigned c. 720 years)
- Family: Mashda (father)

Arwium of Kish was the twelfth Sumerian king in the First Dynasty of Kish, according to the Sumerian king list. His father was Mashda, the previous ruler. Like the other members of the First dynasty prior to Etana, he was named for an animal; his name "Arwium" is Akkadian for "male gazelle". Arwium is unlikely to have existed as his name does not appear on texts dating from the period in which he was presumed to have lived (Early Dynastic period).

Regnal titles
Preceded by Mashda	King of Sumer legendary	Succeeded by Etana
Preceded by Mashda	Ensi of Kish legendary	Succeeded by Etana
