= Puannum =

Sumerian king

- First appearance: Sumerian King List c. 2000 BC

In-universe information
- Occupation: King of Kish (reigned c. 840 years)

Puannum of Kish was the sixth Sumerian king in the First Dynasty of Kish, according to the Sumerian king list. Puannum is unlikely to have existed as his name does not appear on texts dating from the period in which he was presumed to have lived (Early Dynastic period).

Regnal titles
Preceded by Babum	King of Sumer legendary	Succeeded by Kalibum
Preceded by Babum	Ensi of Kish legendary	Succeeded by Kalibum
