= Melem-Kish =

- First appearance: Sumerian King List c. 2000 BC

In-universe information
- Occupation: King of Kish (reigned c. 900 years)
- Family: En-me-nuna (father)

Melem-Kish of Kish was the sixteenth Sumerian king in the First Dynasty of Kish, according to the Sumerian King List (SKL). His father was En-me-nuna, whom he succeeded as ruler. The kings on the early part of the SKL are usually not considered historical, except when they are mentioned in Early Dynastic documents. Melem-Kish is not one of them.

Regnal titles
Preceded by En-me-nuna	King of Sumer legendary	Succeeded by Barsal-nuna
Preceded by En-me-nuna	Ensi of Kish legendary	Succeeded by Barsal-nuna
