= Barsal-nuna =

Barsal-nuna 𒁇𒊩𒉣𒈾
- First appearance: Sumerian King List c. 2000 BC

In-universe information
- Occupation: King of Kish (reigned c. 1,200 years)
- Family: En-me-nuna (father)
- Children: Zamug

Barsal-nuna (Sumerian: 𒁇𒊩𒉣𒈾 bar.sal.nun.na) of Kish was the seventeenth Sumerian king in the First Dynasty of Kish, according to the Sumerian King List. His father was En-me-nuna; he succeeded his brother Melem-Kish. His name may have meant Sheep of the Prince. Barsal (𒁇𒊩) means A sheep. Barsal-nuna is not mentioned in Early Dynastic documents, meaning that is likely that he was not a historical person.

Regnal titles
Preceded by Melem-Kish	King of Sumer legendary	Succeeded by Zamug
Preceded by Melem-Kish	Ensi of Kish legendary	Succeeded by Zamug
