= Mashda =

11th Sumerian King in the First Dynasty of Kish

- First appearance: Sumerian King List c. 2000 BC

In-universe information
- Occupation: King of Kish (reigned c. 840 years)
- Family: Atab (father)
- Children: Arwium

Mashda of Kish was the eleventh Sumerian king in the First Dynasty of Kish, according to the Sumerian king list. He was a son of the king Atab. Like the other members of the First dynasty prior to Etana, he was named for an animal; his name "Mashda" is Akkadian for "gazelle". Mashda is unlikely to have existed as his name does not appear on texts dating from the period in which he was presumed to have lived (Early Dynastic period).

Regnal titles
Preceded by Atab	King of Sumer legendary	Succeeded by Arwium
Preceded by Atab	Ensi of Kish legendary	Succeeded by Arwium
