= Ilku =

Sumerian king

- First appearance: Sumerian King List c. 2000 BC

In-universe information
- Occupation: King of Kish (reigned c. 900 years)

Ilku of Kish was the twentieth Sumerian king in the First Dynasty of Kish, according to the Sumerian King List. His name does not appear in Early Dynastic inscriptions, meaning that he is unlikely to have been a real historical person.

Regnal titles
Preceded by Tizqar	King of Sumer	Succeeded by Iltasadum
Preceded by Tizqar	Ensi of Kish	Succeeded by Iltasadum
