= En-me-nuna =

- First appearance: Sumerian King List c. 2000 BC

In-universe information
- Occupation: King of Kish (reigned c. 660 years)
- Children: Melem-Kish; Barsal-nuna

En-me-nuna of Kish was the fifteenth Sumerian king in the First Dynasty of Kish, according to the Sumerian King List. The kings on the early part of the SKL are usually not considered historical, except when they are mentioned in Early Dynastic documents. En-me-nuna is not one of them.

Regnal titles
Preceded by Balih	King of Sumer legendary	Succeeded by Melem-Kish
Preceded by Balih	Ensi of Kish legendary	Succeeded by Melem-Kish
