= Iltasadum =

Sumerian King

- First appearance: Sumerian King List c. 2000 BC

In-universe information
- Occupation: King of Kish (reigned c. 1,200 years)

Iltasadum of Kish was the 21st Sumerian king in the First Dynasty of Kish, according to the Sumerian King List. His name does not appear in Early Dynastic inscriptions, meaning that he is unlikely to have been a real historical person.

Regnal titles
Preceded by Ilku	King of Sumer	Succeeded by En-me-barage-si
Preceded by Ilku	Ensi of Kish	Succeeded by En-me-barage-si
