= En-tarah-ana =

Sumerian king of Kish

- First appearance: Sumerian King List c. 2000 BC

In-universe information
- Occupation: King of Kish (reigned c. 420 years)

En-tarah-ana of Kish was the fourth Sumerian king in the First Dynasty of Kish, according to the Sumerian king list. The Weld-Blundell Prism was damaged at this point, so Thorkild Jacobsen had restored this ruler's name as Bahina. En-tarah-ana is unlikely to have existed as his name does not appear on texts dating from the period in which he was presumed to have lived (Early Dynastic period). He is awarded a reign of 420 years, 3 months, and 3 1/2 days. Why the length of his reign is so specific compared to the recorded lengths of the other kings of the Early Dynastic is unknown.

Regnal titles
Preceded by Nangishlishma	King of Sumer legendary	Succeeded by Babum
Preceded by Nangishlishma	Ensi of Kish legendary	Succeeded by Babum
