= Tizqar =

- First appearance: Sumerian King List c. 2000 BC

In-universe information
- Occupation: King of Kish (reigned c. 305 years)

Tizqar of Kish was the nineteenth Sumerian king in the First Dynasty of Kish and succeeded his father Zamuq as ruler, according to some versions of the Sumerian King List. His name does not appear in Early Dynastic inscriptions, meaning that he is unlikely to have been a real historical person.

Regnal titles
Preceded by Zamug	King of Sumer	Succeeded by Ilku
Preceded by Zamug	Ensi of Kish	Succeeded by Ilku
