= Balih =

Sumerian king

- First appearance: Sumerian King List c. 2000 BC

In-universe information
- Occupation: King of Kish (reigned c. 400 years)
- Family: Etana (father)

Balih of Kish was the fourteenth Sumerian king in the First Dynasty of Kish, according to the Sumerian king list. His father was Etana, whom he succeeded as ruler. The kings on the early part of the SKL are usually not considered historical, except when they are mentioned in Early Dynastic documents. Balih is not one of them.

Regnal titles
Preceded by Etana	King of Sumer legendary	Succeeded by En-me-nuna
Preceded by Etana	Ensi of Kish legendary	Succeeded by En-me-nuna
