= Babum =

Sumerian ruler of Kish

- First appearance: Sumerian King List c. 2000 BC

In-universe information
- Occupation: King of Kish (reigned c. 300 years)

Babum of Kish was the fifth Sumerian king in the First Dynasty of Kish, according to the Sumerian king list. Babum is unlikely to have existed as his name does not appear on texts dating from the period in which he was presumed to have lived (Early Dynastic period). Like other leader of the first dynasty, his name is an Akkadian word, bābum meaning "gate".

Regnal titles
Preceded by En-tarah-ana	King of Sumer legendary	Succeeded by Puannum
Preceded by En-tarah-ana	Ensi of Kish legendary	Succeeded by Puannum
