= Zamug =

King of Sumeria

- First appearance: Sumerian King List c. 2000 BC

In-universe information
- Occupation: King of Kish (reigned c. 140 years)
- Family: Barsal-nuna (father)

Zamug of Kish was the eighteenth Sumerian king in the First Dynasty of Kish, according to the Sumerian king list. His father was Barsal-nuna, whom he succeeded as ruler. His name does not appear in documents other than the SKL, meaning that it is unlikely that he was a historical person.

Regnal titles
Preceded by Barsal-nuna	King of Sumer	Succeeded by Tizqar
Preceded by Barsal-nuna	Ensi of Kish	Succeeded by Tizqar
