= Atab =

Sumerian king

- First appearance: Sumerian King List c. 2000 BC

In-universe information
- Occupation: King of Kish (reigned c. 600 years)
- Children: Mashda

Atab of Kish was the tenth Sumerian king in the First Dynasty of Kish, according to the Sumerian king list. His successor was his son Mashda. Atab is unlikely to have existed as his name does not appear on texts dating from the period in which he was presumed to have lived (Early Dynastic period).

Preceded by Zuqaqip	King of Sumer legendary	Succeeded by Mashda
Preceded by Zuqaqip	Ensi of Kish legendary	Succeeded by Mashda
