= Nangishlishma =

- First appearance: Sumerian King List c. 2000 BC

In-universe information
- Occupation: King of Kish (reigned c. 670 years)

Nangishlishma of Kish (also written as Nanjiclicma) was the third Sumerian king in the First Dynasty of Kish, who reigned for around 670 years according to some versions of the Sumerian king list. His name does not appear in Early Dynastic inscriptions, meaning that he is unlikely to have been a real historical person.

Regnal titles
Preceded by Kullassina-bel	King of Sumer legendary	Succeeded by En-tarah-ana
Preceded by Kullassina-bel	Ensi of Kish legendary	Succeeded by En-tarah-ana
