= Ur-Zababa =

Sumerian king of Kish

King of Kish
- Reign: c. 2340 BC

Ur-Zababa (fl. c. 2340 BC) is listed on the Sumerian King List as the second king of the 4th Dynasty of Kish. This text also records that Ur-Zababa had appointed Sargon of Akkad as his cup-bearer. Sargon was later the ruler of Akkad.

The ^{d}Ur-^{d}Za-ba-ba (urzababītum) is also the name of an ancient Near Eastern musical instrument (possibly similar to the balag) used in religious ceremonies. It has been suggested that it was named after Ur-Zababa.

In the Ur III Empire period there was a town (and territory) named Ur-Zababa.

== Family ==
According to the King List, Ur-Zababa was a son of King Puzur-Suen. His mother is unknown.

== Sargon legend ==
The Sargon legend is a Sumerian text purporting to be Sargon's biography. In the text, Ur-Zababa is mentioned, who awakens after a dream. For unknown reasons, Ur-Zababa appoints Sargon as a cupbearer. Soon after this, Ur-Zababa invites Sargon to his chambers to discuss a dream of Sargon's, involving the favor of the goddess Inanna. Ur-Zababa was deeply frightened. In an attempt to kill him, Ur-Zababa sends an unwitting Sargon to deliver his bronze mirror to the E-sikil, where the chief smith, Belic-tikal, will receive it. Ur-Zababa instructed the smith to throw Sargon and the mirror into the statue molds upon arrival. However, on his way to the E-sikil the goddess Inanna instructs Sargon to not enter into the E-sikil, but only meet Belic-tikal at the gate of the E-sikil. This ruins Belic-tikal's chance to kill Sargon, and five to ten days later Sargon reappears in the courts of Ur-Zababa.

When Sargon returns to Ur-Zababa, the king becomes frightened again, and decides to send Sargon to Lugal-zage-si of Uruk, with a message on a clay tablet asking him to slay Sargon.

== Other sources ==
The Weidner Chronicle (ABC 19) agrees with both the King List and the Sargon Legend in making Sargon the cupbearer to Ur-Zababa, mentioning him in a single line as ruling in between Kubaba (Kugbau) and Sargon.

Ur-Zababa ordered Sargon, his cupbearer, to change the wine libations of Esagila.

It goes on to say that Sargon failed to comply fully with this order, and though he became king, he was eventually punished by the Sumerian deities for his improper observances.

Most copies of the King List give Ur-Zababa an unrealistic reign of 400 years, but one copy reading "six years" is held to be more plausible.

It is known that Lugal-zaggesi of Uruk and Umma destroyed Kish toward the end of his reign, before himself being deposed by Sargon. It is often assumed that Sargon also played a role in Ur-Zababa's downfall, but the relevant texts are too fragmentary to be explicit.

Ur-Zababa's successors in Kish as named on the king-list, beginning with Zimudar, seem to have been vassals of Sargon, and there is no evidence that they ever really exercised hegemony in Sumer.

== Notes ==
Regnal titles
| Preceded by Possibly Puzur-Suen | King of Kish c. 2340 BC | Succeeded by Possibly Zimudar |
