= Kullassina-bel =

- First appearance: Sumerian King List; c. 2000 BC

In-universe information
- Occupation: King of Kish (reigned c. 930 years)

Kullassina-bel of Kish was the second king in the First Dynasty of Kish according to the Sumerian king list, which adds that he reigned for 960 years (or 900 in some copies).

As the name seems to be an Akkadian phrase meaning "All(kullat) of them(šina) (were) lord(bēl)", it has sometimes been suggested that the occurrence of this name on the list was intended to denote a period of no central authority in the early period of Kish.

An alternative translation of the name is "Lord(bēl) of all(kullat) of them [the women](šina)".

Regnal titles
Preceded by Jushur	King of Sumer legendary	Succeeded by Nangishlishma
Preceded by Jushur	Lugal of Kish legendary	Succeeded by Nangishlishma
