= Zuqaqip =

- First appearance: Sumerian King List c. 2000 BC

In-universe information
- Occupation: King of Kish (reigned c. 900 years)

Zuqaqip of Kish was the ninth Sumerian king of the semi-legendary First Dynasty of Kish, according to the Sumerian King List, where his length of reign is given as 900 years. His name means "Scorpion". Zuqaqip is unlikely to have existed as his name does not appear on texts dating from the period in which he was presumed to have lived (Early Dynastic period).

== Sources ==
Regnal titles
Preceded by Kalumum	King of Sumer legendary	Succeeded by Atab
Preceded by Kalumum	King of Kish legendary	Succeeded by Atab
