= Puzur-Suen =

Sumerian king, founder of fourth Dynasty of Kish

King of Kish
- Reign: c. 2360 BC

Puzur-Suen (fl. c. 2360 BC) was a king of Sumer, possibly a son of Queen Kugbau, the 1st ruler of the 4th dynasty of Kish.

He ruled in Kish for 25 years, according to the Sumerian King List. His son may have been King Ur-Zababa. Nothing else is known about him.

== See also ==
- Chart of ancient Near East rulers
