= Jushur =

Ancient Mesopotamian king

Ğušur 𒄑𒃡
- Ruler of Sumer

King of the First dynasty of Kish
- Predecessor: Deluge; Ziusudra of Shuruppak
- Successor: Possibly Kullassina-bel

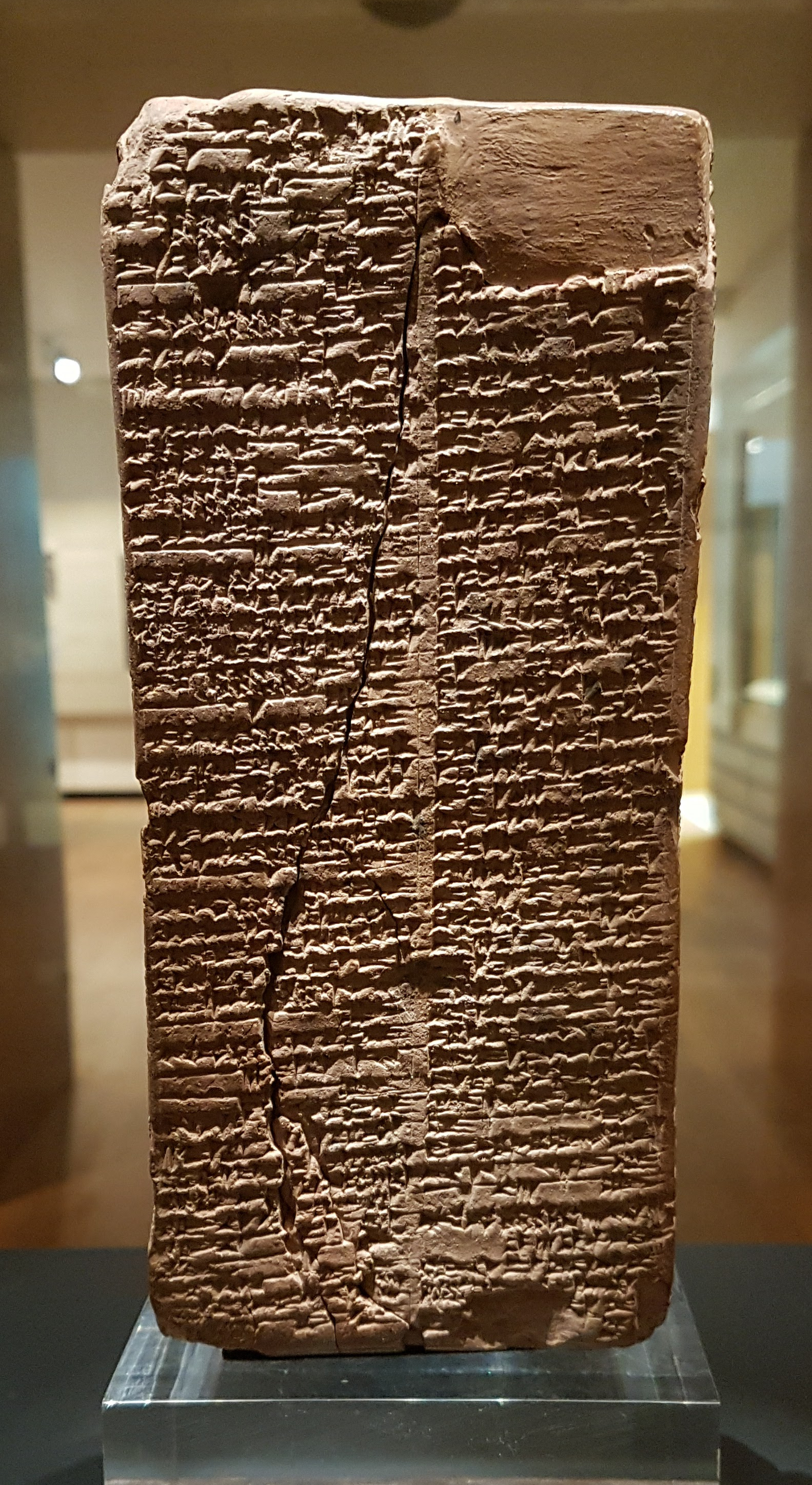
Sumerian King List, c. 1800 BC, Larsa, Iraq

Jushur (cuneiform: 𒄑𒃡 ĜIŠ.UR_{3}; Sumerian: Ĝušur) appears as a king of Kish in the Sumerian king list, a literary composition created in Mesopotamia at the beginning of the second millennium BC. He is either the first king on the list to be mentioned, or the first king after a flood, depending on the version of the SKL. According to the list, Jushur reigned for 1,200 years. Jushur does not appear in Early Dynastic inscriptions. His historicity, like that of many other kings of the earlier parts of the Sumerian King List, is considered unlikely.

Ĝušur has also been transliterated in the literature as Jushur, Jucur, Gushur, Ngushur, and Gishur. An early reading of the cuneiform was Gaur.
