= Etana =

Ancient Mesopotamian king

Etana 𒂊𒋫𒈾
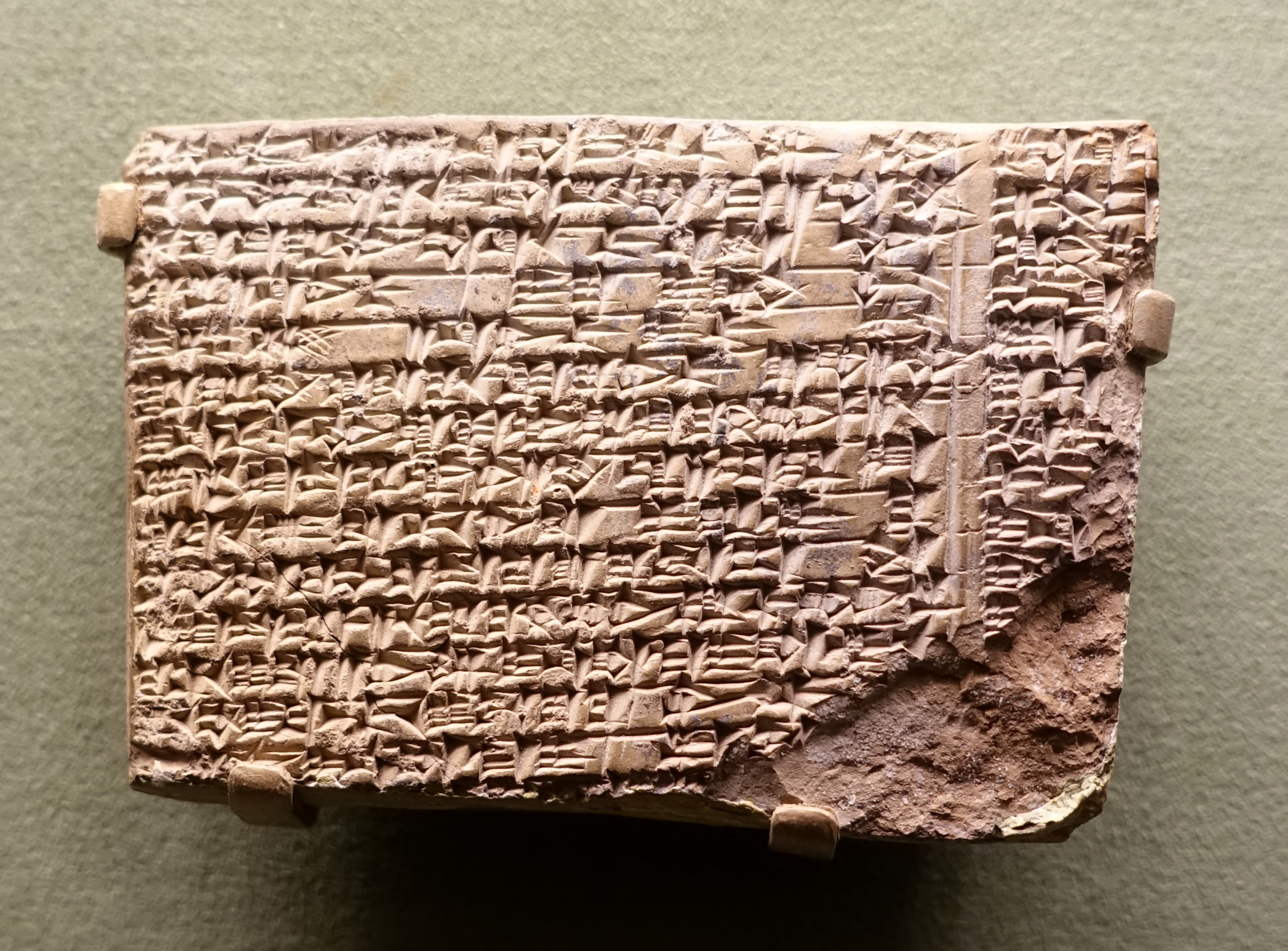
- Fragment of the Epic of Etana, Akkadian, c. 1750 BC
- First appearance: Sumerian King List c. 2000 BC

In-universe information
- Occupation: King of Kish (reigned c. 1,500 years)
- Children: Balih

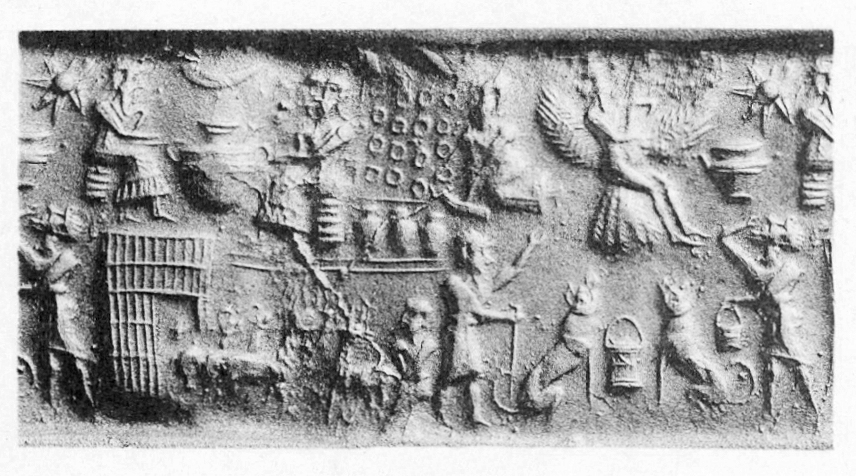
The Myth of Etana. Seal impression of the Akkadian Empire period.

Etana (𒂊𒋫𒈾, E.TA.NA) was the thirteenth king of the first dynasty of Kish, according to the Sumerian King List. He is listed as the successor of Arwium, the son of Mashda, as king of Kish. The list also calls Etana "the shepherd, who ascended to heaven and consolidated all the foreign countries", and states that he ruled 1,500 years (some copies read 635) before being succeeded by his son Balih, said to have ruled 400 years. The kings on the early part of the SKL are usually not considered historical, except when they are mentioned in contemporary Early Dynastic documents. Etana is one of them.

== Myth of Etana ==
A Babylonian legend says that Etana was desperate to have a child, until one day he helped save an eagle from starving, who then took him up into the sky to find the plant of birth. This led to the birth of his son, Balih.

In the detailed form of the legend, there is a tree with the eagle's nest at the top, and a serpent at the base. Both the serpent and eagle have promised Utu (the sun god) to behave well toward one another, and they share food with their children.

But one day, the eagle eats the serpent's children. The serpent comes back and cries. Utu tells the serpent to hide inside the stomach of a dead bull. The eagle goes down to eat the bull. The serpent captures the eagle, and throws him into a pit to die of hunger and thirst. Utu sends a man, Etana, to help the eagle. Etana saves the eagle, but he also asks the bird to find the plant of birth, in order to become father of a son. The eagle takes Etana up to the heaven of the god Anu, but Etana becomes afraid in the air and he goes back to the ground. He makes another attempt, and finds the plant of birth, enabling him to have Balih.

So far, versions in three languages have been found. The Old Babylonian version comes from Susa and Tell Harmal, the Middle Assyrian version comes from Assur, and the Standard version is from Nineveh.

== Analysis ==
Folklorist scholarship recognizes that the tale of Etana helping an eagle fits into the Aarne–Thompson–Uther tale type ATU 537, "The Eagle as helper: hero carried on the wings of a helpful eagle". It has also been suggested that the myth of Etana originated the folk-type of later oral tradition.

== See also ==
- History of Sumer
- Mesopotamian mythology
- Aratta

Preceded by Arwium	King of Sumer; Ensi of Kish legendary	Succeeded by Balih
