= Ensi (Sumerian) =

Sumerian title for a ruler or prince

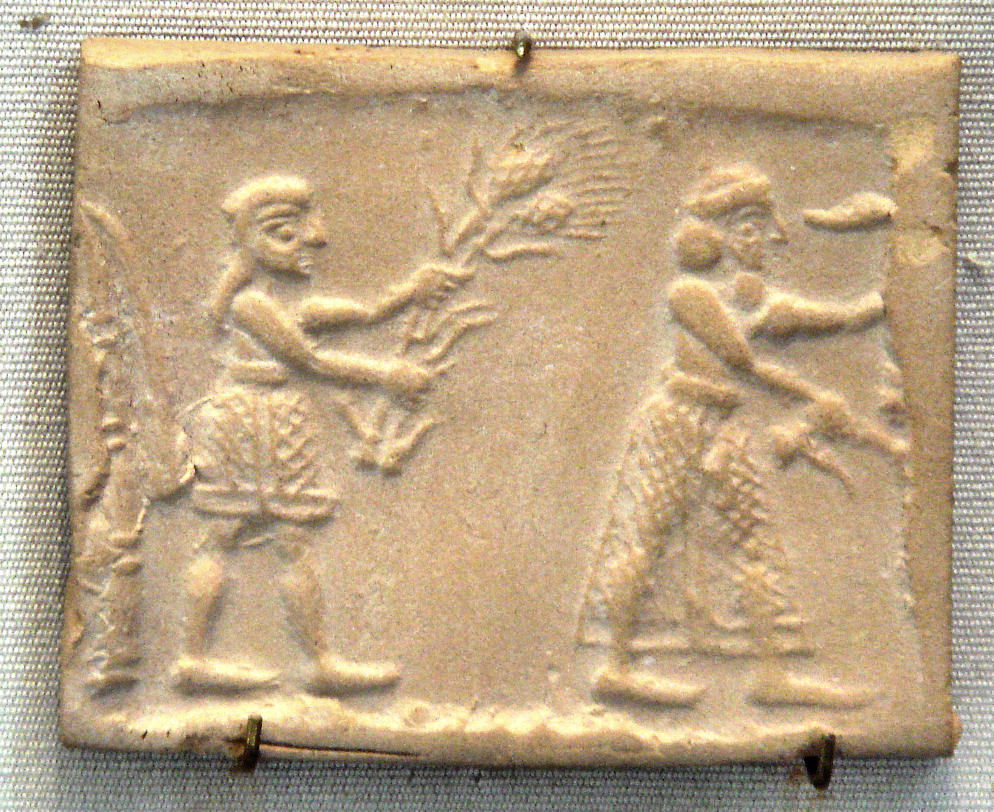
Sumerian cylinder seal impression dating to c. 3200 BC, showing an ensi and his acolyte feeding a sacred herd.

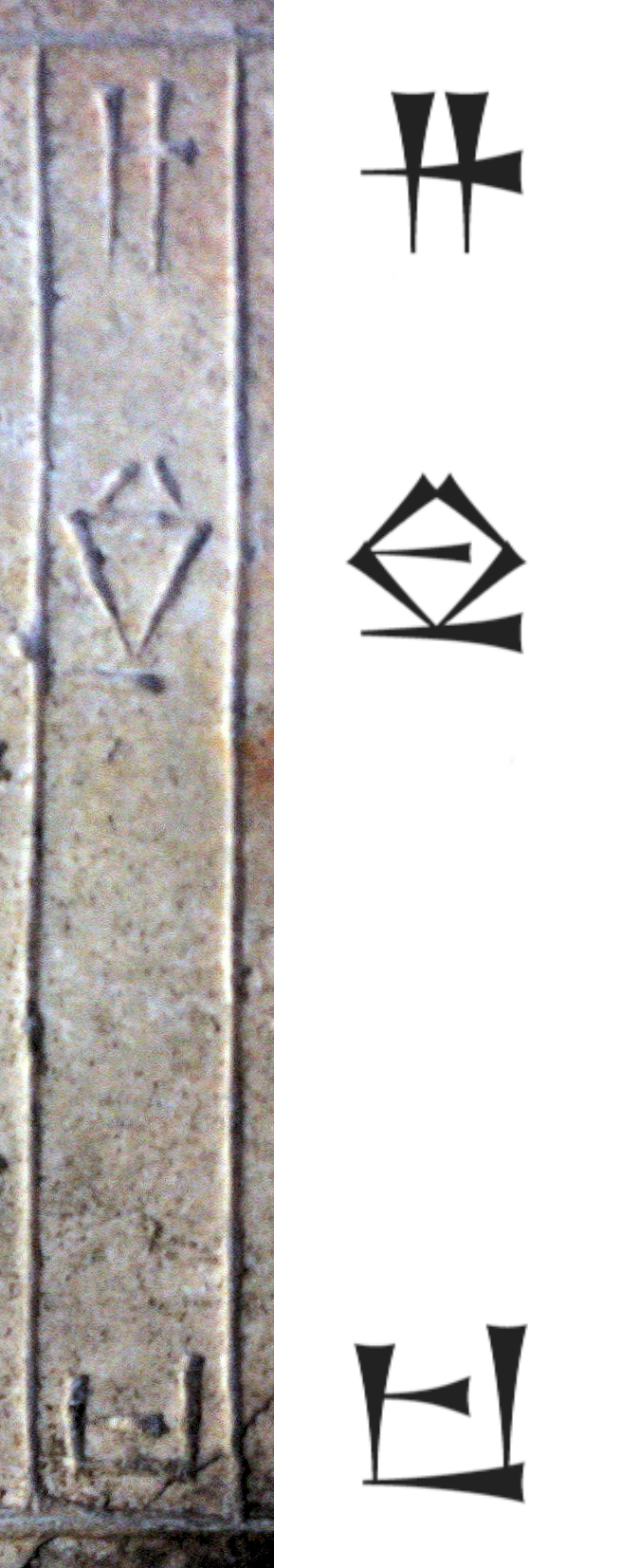
PA.TE.SI (Ensi) on the tablet of Lugalanatum.

Ensi (cuneiform: 𒑐𒋼𒋛 pa.te.si Sumerian: ensik, "lord of the plowland"; Emesal dialect: umunsik; Akkadian: iššakkum) was a Sumerian title designating the ruler or prince of a city-state. Originally it may have designated an independent ruler, but in later periods the title presupposed subordinance to a lugal.

For the Early Dynastic Period (about 2800–2350 BC), the meaning of the titles en, ensi and lugal cannot be differentiated clearly: see lugal, ensi and en for details. Ensi may have originally been a designation of the ruler restricted to Lagash and Umma. The ensi was considered a representative of the city-state's patron deity. In later periods, an ensi was normally seen as subordinate to a lugal. Nevertheless, even the powerful rulers of the Second Dynasty of Lagash (c. 2100 BC) such as Gudea were satisfied with the title ensi.

During the Third Dynasty of Ur (about 2100–2000 BC) ensi referred to the provincial governors of the kingdom. These exercised great powers in terms of government, tax revenue and jurisdiction, but they were supervised, installed, and dismissed by the lugal of Ur. Although the office could be inherited, all ensi had to be endorsed by the lugal. No independent foreign policy or warfare was allowed.

In the city-state of Assur, the hereditary ruler bore the Akkadian-language version of the title ensi, while the patron deity was regarded as šarrum "king".

They held most political power in Sumerian city-states during the Uruk period (c. 4100–2900 BC).
