= Idlurugu =

Mesopotamian god and legal procedure

- God of river ordeal
- Major cult center: Id

Genealogy
- Spouse: Kiša
- Children: Šazi

Idlurugu (Sumerian: i_{7}-lú-ru-gú, also read Ilurugu) or Id (^{d}ÍD) was a Mesopotamian god regarded as both a river deity and a divine judge. He was the personification of a type of trial by ordeal, which shared its name with him.

Idlurugu was chiefly worshiped in Id (modern Hit). However, he was not strongly associated with any location, but rather with trial of water alone, and as such appears in sources from many parts of the Ancient Near East.

== Name ==
The term i_{7}-lú-ru-gú, "the river that receives man" or "the river which confronts man," could refer both to the god (in which case it was preceded by the dingir sign denoting a word as a deity's name) or to the procedure. He could also be referred to as Id. The logogram ÍD, either with a dingir or without it, similarly designated the procedure itself as well. While it was usually read as id, there are also known instances where it was instead nārum, the Akkadian word for river. While nārum was grammatically feminine, the deity was always regarded as male. The names were used interchangeably. Various forms are attested in theophoric names, for example Nārum-ilu, Idlurugu-naid, or Id-abi.

Two further names of Idlurugu are listed in the god list An = Anum, Idgal and Idsilim. Additionally, a similarly named deity, Lugalidda ("king of the river"), appears in it alongside Lugala'abba, a sea god, and according to Wilfred G. Lambert might represent a cosmic river.

== Character ==
Due to being a personification of the ordeal procedure, Idlurugu is considered to be one of the Mesopotamian deities of law by researchers. As noted by Dietz Otto Edzard, he did not necessarily embody any specific river, but rather rivers in general and especially the concept of trial by water. It has been proposed that Idlurugu was believed to carry the guilty to the underworld, and that as such he represented an underworld river, Hubur. A god named Lugal-Hubur, "lord of Hubur," is known from a list of underworld deities. Hubur should not be confused with the real river Khabur.

There is no indication that the river god was tied to any specific topographical feature in the south of Mesopotamia, and he always appears in relation to the institution of the river ordeal rather than as a divine personification of a real body of water. Other deities could however be associated with specific rivers in Mesopotamian religion. For example, Irḫan represented the western branch of the Euphrates while Ḫabūrītum, worshiped in the court of the Third Dynasty of Ur (though likely originally from Sikani), is assumed to be a personification of the Khabur. Buranuna, an ancient name of the Euphrates, could be also treated as the name of a deity, especially in Mari, though such a possibility is also attested in the Early Dynastic Mesopotamian god list from Fara. Turul, the ancient name of Diyala, could appear as a theophoric element in personal names, indicating that this river was at times deified too.

It has been argued that as early as during the reign of Gudea, Idlurugu could be associated with bitumen and sulfur.

=== Idlurugu as a legal procedure ===
Trial by ordeal is well attested in Mesopotamian sources, and as in the case of customs referred to with this term from other areas and time periods, involved a test during which either one of both of the parties involved had to be exposed to a specific substance, with the one who emerged unscathed regarded as the winner, determined by a higher power. Only trial by water was known in Mesopotamia. It was already used in the Sargonic period, and was remained a part of Mesopotamian culture until the time of the Neo-Babylonian Empire, References from the Kassite period are particularly numerous. It is known from both Babylonia and Assyria, as well as from parts of Anatolia, from Nuzi and from Elam, especially Susa. While it is also attested in Mari, for the most part no instances are known from Syria from before the period of neo-Assyrian rule.

It was utilized when no written or oral evidence was available, which according to ancient Mesopotamian jurisprudence meant that the case had to be resolved through the authority of a deity. The sides in cases in which this process could be used were always private individuals under the jurisdiction of the same monarch, never kingdoms. In the oldest sources, the ordeal was unilateral, with the defendant taking it in Assyria and Babylonia, and the plaintiff in Elam, but later bilateral ordeals became the norm. A third party could serve as a representative of one of the sides and take the trial on their behalf. If a side refused to undertake it, the case was considered forfeited. Sources from Mari indicate that the participants were expected to swim a certain distance in a river. The procedure was not necessarily meant to result in death, for example in Nuzi it was customary to make sure the person undertaking it survived, While many references to people dying or expecting to die during it are known from Mari from the Old Babylonian period, a neo-Babylonian literary text indicates that by this time death during the trial was regarded as unusual.

While legal codes, such as the Code of Ur-Nammu and the Code of Hammurabi, only prescribe the use of river ordeal in cases of adultery (in the latter document it is further specified that only if it leads to a public scandal) and sorcery, there are also accounts of ordeals being undertaken in property, treason and sacrilege cases, and in Nuzi and Elam also as a form of appellation. The authority responsible for initiating the procedure seemingly varies between sources, with kings, judges, priests, governors or simply the litigants themselves all being mentioned in various documents.

Idlurugu was the main god associated with the procedure, but other deities could be invoked in relation to it, for example Enki (or his Akkadian counterpart Ea), as well as his wife Damkina and their son Asalluhi.

== Worship ==
The cult center of Idlurugu, as well as a location where the trial by water could be undertaken, was Id (modern Hit) on the Euphrates. There are known instances of individuals from as far west as Emar and as far east as Elam arriving there to undergo the trial, in addition to inhabitants of Mari and northern Mesopotamia. In the south, at least from the Middle Babylonian period onward the traditional center of river ordeal was seemingly Parak-māri, most likely located in a presently unknown area south of Nippur. In a neo-Babylonian text known as Nebuchadnezzar, King of Justice, the ordeal takes place near Sippar.

Two temples of the river god are listed in the so-called "Canonical Temple List," though their locations are unknown. One of them simply bore the name E-Idlurgu ("house of Idlurugu"), while the other's name is not fully preserved, but also contains the name Idlurugu. They should not be confused with the E-idlurugukalamma ("House of the river ordeal of the land"), a temple of Ningal in Ur. In later times, Idlurugu and his wife Kiša were also worshiped in Assur, where they had a cultic seat near a well in the Ešarra temple complex.

In some cities, an annual ritual involved the purification of a goddess in a river associated with Idlurugu. The celebration involved Ningal in Ur, Bau in Uruk, Nanshe in Nina, and either Nungal or Ninegal in Isin. A rite connected to Ilurugu also took place in Nippur during a festival of Inanna in the Ur III period. Two later texts from Nippur, Astrolabe B and the Nippur Compendium, similarly indicate that in this city Ilurugu rites were associated with Ishtar.

In an inscription Shulgi of Ur referred to the river god as his lord. Offerings to him were performed in Ur by queen Nin-kalla in the same period. He is also present in texts from Puzrish-Dagan, Umma and Girsu. A reference to Idlurugu as a king's "lord" is also known from a letter of king Zimri-Lim of Mari. In the letter to the River god Zimri-Lim also mentions giving him a golden cup and asked the god to not favor anyone else. Charpin suggests that this message should be set within the context of the negotiations with Hammurabi of Babylon about who would control the city of Hit (with the sukkalmah of Elam as mediator). Hammurabi remarked that he would not sign the treaty if he was not given Hit, meaning that the request Zimri-Lim made to the god could have been directed at Hammurabi. The problem regarding the city of Hit would not be resolved for years.

Theophoric names invoking Id are already known from the Early Dynastic and Sargonic periods, with early examples including Id-laba and Idi-Id.

== Associations with other deities ==
Idlurugu's wife was Kiša. She was referred to as "the nice woman" (^{nu}nunus šaga), which according to Wilfred G. Lambert might indicate her name was understood as "nice earth." He proposes that the pair could be envisioned as deities with cosmogonic significance, a primordial couple consisting of water and earth, an alternative to the better known pair of heaven (Anu) and earth (Ki or Urash). In a late double column copy of the Weidner god list, Id and Kiša are explained as Ea and Damkina.

The son of Idlurugu and Kiša was the god Šazi, who was responsible for judging the person undergoing the river ordeal in sources from Elam. A text from Susa mentions that he was believed to smash the heads of those who questioned binding contracts. Wilfred G. Lambert proposed that Šazi should be understood as analogous to Šazu, one of the names of Marduk in the Enūma Eliš, pointing out that the equation of his parents with Enki and Damkina would make it possible to equate him with Asalluhi and thus with Marduk by extension. Šazu is otherwise unknown, with the exception of two references in explanatory lists of Marduk's names, which however do not regard it as the name of a river or judge deity. A hymn of Sin-Iddinam of Larsa identifies Asalluhi as a son of Idlurugu.

The sukkal (divine "vizier") of Idlurugu was Nēr-ē-tagmil. His name means "kill, spare not." He is known from the god list An = Anum, from a single fragment of an incantation, and from an inscription of Shamshi-Adad V, which identifies him as one of the gods worshiped in Der. A single text identifies the name Nēr-ē-tagmil as a title of Nergal rather than as a distinct deity. Nēr-ē-tagmil is assumed to be one of the sukkals who were deified personifications of specific commands of their masters, similar to Eturammi ("do not slacken"), the sukkal of Birtum, Ugur ("destroy"), the sukkal of Nergal, or Tašme-zikru ("she listens to commands"), the sukkal of Išḫara.

A fragment of a myth known from a copy from Ebla mentions a divine tribunal in which Idlurugu (^{d}ÍD) takes part alongside the sun god Shamash and Ištaran. Both of these gods were already regarded as divine judges in the third millennium BCE. A hymn to Utu states that Idlurugu cannot give judgment without the sun god's presence.

The prison goddess Manungal was also believed to watch over the river ordeal alongside her entourage. In the Hymn to Nungal, an allusion is made to her sukkal, Nindimgul ("lady mooring pole") saving a participant in the ordeal because he submits to the judgment.

In offering lists from the Ur III period, Idlurugu commonly appears in the company of gods associated with the underworld. For example, he received offerings alongside Allatum on the seventh day of a sizkur celebration dedicated to her. The pair Lugal-irra and Meslamta-ea were connected with the river ordeal and its god sometimes too.

In laments, Idlurugu could appear alongside Enki, Damkina, as well as Amurru, in this case apparently considered to be a god associated with Eridu.

=== Idlurugu and Ugaritic ṯpṭ nhr ===
Whether a connection existed between Idlurugu and ṯpṭ nhr, an epithet of the Ugaritic sea god Yam which can be translated as "Judge River," is unclear. The first word, ṯpṭ, is a cognate of Hebrew shophet and Akkadian šāpaṭu(m), whose meaning can be more accurately translated as "to give decrees." Herbert Niehr argues that ṯpṭ nhr should instead be translated as "Ruler River" and reflects Yam's dominion over sweet water, as there is no firm evidence that ordeal by water was ever performed in Ugarit. However, according to Aicha Rahmouni it can be safely assumed that this epithet reflects a similar role of Yam as that played by Idlurugu in Mesopotamia. She also notes it is sometimes proposed that the "river" mentioned in this epithet (nhr) was originally a distinct deity from Yam, Nahar, though in the known Ugaritic texts both occur in parallel, indicating they refer to one deity.
