= Kubaba =

Legendary Mesopotamian queen

Kubaba 𒆬𒀭𒁀𒌑
- First appearance: Sumerian King List c. 2000 BCE

In-universe information
- Occupation: Queen of Kish (Around 100 years, c. 2400 BCE)

Kubaba (Sumerian: 𒆬𒀭𒁀𒌑, kug-^{D}ba-u₂) was a legendary Mesopotamian queen who according to the Sumerian King List ruled over Kish for a hundred years before the rise of the dynasty of Akshak. It has been suggested that she was not a historical figure due to anomalies such as the atypical form of the name.

== Name ==
Kubaba's name was written in cuneiform as kù-^{d}ba-ú, kù-^{d}bu-ú, ku-ub-ba-bu-ú or ku-ub-ba-bu-ú. It is also romanized as Ku-Baba, with a hyphen separating the elements and the first letter of the theonym capitalized. The first sign can be transcribed as kug rather than ku, which is reflected by the title of the corresponding entry in the Reallexikon der Assyriologie, Ku(g)-Baba. This name can be translated from Sumerian as "radiant Baba" or "silver of Baba". The correct reading of the last sign in the theonym used as the second element of this theophoric name remains a matter of debate, with /u/ and /wu/ proposed in addition to /ba/. The name of the queen can accordingly be alternatively romanized as Kug-Bau or Kug-Bawu. A lexical list focused on names of rulers provides it with the Akkadian translation Baba-ellet (^{d}ba-ba_{6}-el-let).

=== Queen Kubaba and goddess Kubaba ===
Due to spatial and temporal differences, a connection between the names of Kubaba and the similarly named goddess Kubaba cannot be established. Gonzalo Rubio stresses that the name of the latter has no clear etymology and cannot be interpreted as originating in either Sumerian or any of the Semitic languages. It was written in cuneiform as ^{d}ku-ba-ba or ^{d}ku-pa-pa.

== Historicity ==
Arguments have been made that Kubaba might have been a historical ruler, though this view is not regarded as plausible today. Earliest sources mentioning her were only composed centuries after she supposedly lived. Assyriologists consider her a "legendary" or "mythical" ruler. As noted by Gianni Marchesi, names starting with the element ku- are not attested before the Ur III period, and placing a ruler bearing one of them in the Early Dynastic period constitutes an anachronism. Claus Wilcke points out that in the Sumerian King List Kubaba's reign is supernaturally long, lasting 100 years. It has been pointed out that the SKL does not accurately reflect Early Dynastic history, as indicated by the complete omission of Lagash, which was a major political power, especially during the reign of Eannatum. Kubaba is also not mentioned in any of the discovered inscriptions of historical Early Dynastic rulers. Marten Stol concludes that texts mentioning Kubaba should only be interpreted as speculation about traditional folk stories.

== Attestations in literary texts ==
=== Sumerian King List ===
Kubaba is mentioned in the Sumerian King List, though due to her gender her inclusion is considered unusual. While some modern authors refer to her as a queen, the Sumerian title applied to her is lugal ("king"), which had no feminine counterpart. A recension from Ur instead states that there was no king while Kubaba reigned. She is the only ruler from the third dynasty of Kish listed. The list describes her as an innkeeper (^{mí}LÚ.KAŠ.TIN-na), credits her with "strengthening the foundation of Kish" and attributes a 100 years long reign culminating in a temporary transfer of power from Kish to Akshak before it was regained by Puzur-Suen. The latter ruler is said to be Kubaba's son, which makes her the grandmother of Ur-Zababa, a legendary opponent of historical Sargon of Akkad; Piotr Steinkeller points out that the historicity of these rulers of Kish and the related Sargon tradition is contradicted by an inscription which mentions the city was sacked by Enshakushanna of Uruk, who might have been a contemporary of Sargon, and its king at the time, who was taken as a captive, was named Enbi-Eštar. The oldest known copies of the SKL date back to the Ur III period. While names of some rulers, for example Mesannepada, were likely sourced from votive inscriptions, others, like Bazi and Zizi, might have been ordinary given names copied from lexical lists, such as the Early Dynastic so-called Names and Professions List, or outright inventions. Early versions of the SKL do not contain anecdotes about individual rulers, including Kubaba, which indicates they most likely were a later invention. The compilers used few, if any, historical accounts. Accordingly, Kubaba's background is treated as fantastical, and has been compared to other unusual stories or members of various professions becoming kings in the same composition, including the fuller Susuda, the sailor Mamagal, and the stone worker Nanniya.

=== Other texts ===
In the so-called Weidner Chronicle, which is considered a derivative of the Sumerian King List, the order of Kubaba's dynasty and the dynasty of Akshak is switched around, with Puzur-Niraḫ reigning before her rather than later on. The section dedicated to her is poorly preserved. It relays how Kubaba was granted kingship by Marduk after she delivered an offering of fish to his temple Esagil. The composition is focused on conveying the message that kings who neglected to worship Marduk were rendered powerless, and to that end employs a number of anachronisms, this account being one of them. It is known from Neo-Assyrian and Neo-Babylonian copies, and was originally composed no earlier than c. 1100 BCE.

References to Kubaba are also known from texts focused on omens linked to liver divination. As noted by Beate Pongratz-Leisten, references to legendary rulers such as her, Gušur, Etana or Gilgamesh in works belonging to this category were meant to establish them as paradigmatic models of kingship. In one of the omen compendiums, the "omen of Kubaba" is the birth of an androgynous being with both a penis and a vagina. It is possible the birth of a sheep rather than a human is meant. Such an event is said to foretell that "the country of the king shall be ruined". Marten Stol argues that its negative character reflected a negative perception of a woman fulfilling a typically masculine role, that of a ruler. Other omens preserve a tradition according to which Kubaba was a warrior.

== Bibliography ==
- Edzard, Dietz-Otto (1983), "Ku(g)-Baba", Reallexikon der Assyriologie
- Frayne, Douglas (2009). Pre-Sargonic Period. Toronto: University of Toronto Press. doi:10.3138/9781442688865. ISBN 978-1-4426-8886-5.
- Glassner, Jean-Jacques (2004). Mesopotamian Chronicles. Writings from the ancient world. Society of Biblical Literature. ISBN 978-1-58983-090-5.
- Hawkins, John D. (1983), "Kubaba A. Philologisch · Kubaba A. Philological", Reallexikon der Assyriologie
- Marchesi, Gianni (2002). "On the Divine Name ^{d}BA.Ú". Orientalia. 71 (2). GBPress- Gregorian Biblical Press: 161–172. ISSN 0030-5367. JSTOR 43076783.
- Marchesi, Gianni (2004). "Who Was Buried in the Royal Tombs of Ur? The Epigraphic and Textual Data". Orientalia. 73 (2). GBPress - Gregorian Biblical Press: 153–197. ISSN 0030-5367. JSTOR 43076896.
- Marchesi, Gianni (2010). "The Sumerian King List and the Early History of Mesopotamia". Ana turri gimilli: studi dedicati al padre Werner R. Mayer, S.J., da amici e allievi. Quaderni di Vicino Oriente. Università di Roma La Sapienza.
- Pongratz-Leisten, Beate (2015). Religion and Ideology in Assyria. Studies in Ancient Near Eastern Records (SANER). De Gruyter. ISBN 978-1-61451-426-8.
- Rubio, Gonzalo (2010). "Reading Sumerian Names, I: Ensuhkešdanna and Baba". Journal of Cuneiform Studies. 62. American Schools of Oriental Research: 29–43. doi:10.1086/JCS41103869. ISSN 0022-0256. JSTOR 41103869. S2CID 164077908.
- Steinkeller, Piotr (2017). History, Texts and Art in Early Babylonia. De Gruyter. doi:10.1515/9781501504778. ISBN 978-1-5015-0477-8.
- Stol, Marten (2000). Birth in Babylonia and the Bible: Its Mediterranean Setting. Cuneiform Monographs. Brill Styx. ISBN 978-90-72371-89-8.
- Stol, Marten (2016). Women in the Ancient Near East. De Gruyter. doi:10.1515/9781614512639. ISBN 978-1-61451-263-9.
- Wilcke, Claus (1988). "Die Sumerische Königsliste und erzählte Vergangenheit". Vergangenheit in mündlicher Überlieferung. De Gruyter. pp. 113–140. doi:10.1515/9783110975246.113. ISBN 9783110975246.

Preceded by En-shag-kush-ana of Uruk	Queen of Sumer legendary	Succeeded by King of Akshak
Preceded by	Queen of Kish legendary	Succeeded by
