= Urua =

Ancient city of Elam (modern Iran)

Urua

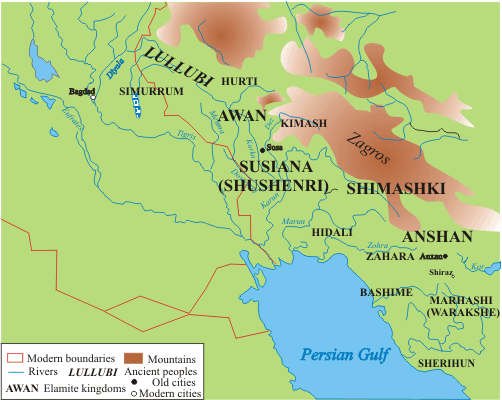
Map of Elam c. 2000 BC

Approximate location of Urua

Urua (URUxA^{ki}) was an ancient Near East city in the border area between ancient Mesoptamia and ancient Elam. It is known in the 3rd millennium BC. Its location is currently unknown but is thought to be in modern Khuzestan Province, Iran. The god Dumuzi-Urua is attested in Umma in the Ur III period.

It is not to be confused with the Uruaz (uru-az^{ki}) which was in the same region.

== History ==
Urua was one of the lands conquered by King Eannatum of Lagash in Sumer, circa 2500 BC reporting in one of his inscriptions "He defeated the ruler of Urua, who stood with the (city’s) emblem in the vanguard". He also reported defeating the land of Uruaz saying "He sacked Uruaz and killed its ruler". Capitves from Uruaz were blinded.

There is a record of Dudu, a high official of Eannatum, buying stone in Urua to make a votive wall plaque.

In the Akkadian Empire period, one of the year names of its first ruler Sargon of Akkad (c. 2334–2279 BC) was "Year in which Uru'a was destroyed".

In the Ur III period, late in the 3rd millennium BC, Urua was a tax paying province of the empire of Ur with an appointed governor. Nin-kalla, wife of the second ruler of Ur III, Shulgi (c. 2094–2046 BC), held large estates at Urua. Prince Etel-pū-Dagān, son of Shulgi, is known to have been sent to Urua to supervise sheering of sheep. Urua is known to have been a producer of wool at that time. In the 7th regnal year of ruler Shu-Sin (c. 2037–2028 BC) a text mentions "tribute of Urua delivered by Sulgi-adamu, ensi of Urua".

== Location ==
One proposal is unexcavated Tepe Musiyan, on the Deh Luran Plain in Khuzestan Province, Iran. Girsu and Lagash were cities that Urua had close economic ties with. Based on Ur III administrative documents from there an areal location of northeast of Puzriš-Dagān and a short distance from Susa has been proposed, specifically in northwestern Khuzestan.

== See also ==
- Pashime
- Marhasi
- Simurrum
- Awan
