= Birtum =

Mesopotamian god

- Deified fetters

Genealogy
- Siblings: Šarrabu
- Spouse: Nungal

Birtum (𒀭𒁉𒅕𒌈, also spelled Birdu) was a Mesopotamian god who was the husband of Nungal. He was regarded as a deity associated with the underworld.

== Character ==
Birtum's name means "fetter" or "shackle" in Akkadian, and he was likely a deification of such objects. While the word is grammatically feminine, the deity was regarded as male. A similar word, birdu ("pimple"), is etymologically unrelated to his name.

In god lists he appears in the circle of Nergal as one of the gods associated with the underworld.

== Associations with other deities ==
Birtum was the husband of Nungal, the goddess of prisons. It has been proposed that he was a son of Enlil, as his wife was on occasion addressed as the daughter in law of this god.

His sukkal (attendant deity) was the god Eturammi (also spelled Eturame), whose name means "do not slacken." It is assumed that he was one of the sukkals who were simply personification of specific commands of their masters, similar to Id's sukkal Nēr-ē-tagmil ("kill, do not spare") or Nergal's sukkal Ugur ("destroy").

Birtum could be regarded as a twin brother of the god Šarrab(u), though sometimes the latter is instead paired with Šâbu instead. The former tradition is documented in the god list An = Anum. The names of both Birtum and Šarrabu could be written logographically as ^{d}KAL.EDIN, which literally meant "youngster of the steppe" or "strong one of the steppe." Šarrabu itself might mean "cheater" or "slanderer," though other possibilities have also been proposed, including a possible association with the Arabic word sārab, "Fata Morgana." In a single source the names of the pair are explained as "Lugal-irra and Meslamta-ea of MAR.KI"

== Worship ==
Wilfred G. Lambert proposed that originally Birtum was worshiped alongside Nungal in a presently unknown city which declined in the third millennium BCE, which lead to transfer of its tutelary deities to Nippur. A well known example of such a process is the case of Nisaba, whose cult was transferred from Eresh, which disappears from records after the Ur III period, to Nippur.

== Mythology ==
In a late version of the myth of Anzû, Enlil asks his assistant Nuska to summon Birtum. While the fragment in which he explains to Birtum why he needs his help is missing, in the subsequent section of the text he congratulates Ninurta (who he addresses as his lord) on behalf of Enlil and urges him to return the Tablet of Destinies after his defeat of Anzû. Ninurta rebukes him and states that he will keep this item for himself.
