= Akshak =

Ancient Sumerian city

- 𒌔𒆠 (Sumerian)
- Location within Near East Location within Iraq
- 33°5′40″N 44°31′20″E
- Type: City
- Periods: Early Dynastic I, II, and III, Akkadian, Ur III, Isin-Larsa, Old Babylonian
- Cultures: Sumer
- Associated with: Sumerians
- Location: Uncertain; somewhere in the Diyala Governorate of the Republic of Iraq
- Region: Mesopotamia

History
- Built: c. 2900 BC
- Abandoned: c. 1595 BC

Site notes
- Condition: Lost city

Akshak (Sumerian: 𒌔𒆠, akšak) (pre-Sargonic - u_{4}kúsu.KI, Ur III - ^{a}kúsu.KI, Phonetic - ak-su-wa-ak) was a city of ancient Sumer, situated on the northern boundary of Akkad, sometimes identified with Babylonian Upi (Greek Opis). It is known, based on an inscription "‘Ur-kisala, the sangu-priest of Sin of Akshak, son of Na-ti, pasisu-priest of Sin to Salam presented [this statue]." that there was a temple of the god Sin in Akshak.

== History ==
Cities of Sumer with one guess for location of Akshak

Akshak first appears in a Sumerian literary composition Dumuzid's dream, where Dumuzid king of Uruk is said to have been toppled from his opulence by a hungry mob composed of men from the major cities of Sumer, including Akshak. The partially literary Sumerian king list mentions Unzi, Undalulu, Urur, Puzur-Nirah, Ishu-Il and Shu-Sin as kings of Akshak. Puzur-Nirah is also mentioned in the millennia later literary composition Weidner Chronicle as reigning in Akshak when a female tavern-keeper, Kug-bau of Kish, was appointed overlordship over Sumer.

Moving into actual archaeological sources, a king of Uruk, Enshakushanna, is recorded on a stone vessel from Nippur as attacking Akshak saying "The leader of Kish and the leader of Akshak, (when) both their cities were destroyed ...". Following this, Akshak was at war with Lagash, and was captured by Eannatum, who claims in one inscription (on Boulder A v 4-5) to have smitten its king, Zuzu.

"For the god Ningirsu, E-anatum, ruler of Lagash, ... In the year of the offensive of Akshak, E-anatum, nominee of the god Ningirsu, crushed Zuzu, king of Akshak, (all the way) from Antasur of Ningirsu to Akshak, and killed him. ... Kish trembled before E-anatum. drove the king of Akshak back to his own land. ... He defeated Kish, Akshak, and Mari at Antasur of the god Ningirsu."

The town of Antasur featured in several conflicts between Lagash and nearby Girsu. Akshak was also mentioned in tablets found at Ebla. In ca. 2350 BC, Akshak fell into the hands of Lugalzagesi of Umma. The Akkadian king Shar-Kali-Sharri reports defeating the Elamites in a battle at Akshak in his year name "In the year in which Szarkaliszarri brought the battle against Elam and Zahara in front of Akszak and ... and was victorious". A year name of an undetermined ruler of the Akkadian Empire reads "Year in which the Akszak canal in Nippur was split". The city was also mentioned in an Old Babylonian period tablet found at Sippar-Amnanum. A fragmentary year name of a ruler of that period, Itur-Shamash, mentions Akshak, "Year Itur-Szamasz built the temple of ... in Akszak". Itur-Shamash, son of Idinilu, is thought to have been ruler of the city of Kisurra.

There are no records for Akshak after the Old Babylonian period.

== Location ==
Its exact location is uncertain. Classical writers located it where the Tigris and Euphrates rivers are closest together and it was mentioned along with Kish and Girsu in early records. Archaeologists in the 1900s placed Akshak at the site of Tel Omar (or Tel Umar) where a pair of sites straddles the Tigris, but that turned out to be Seleucia (possibly earlier Upi/Opis) when it was excavated by LeRoy Waterman of the American Schools of Oriental Research. Initially it was thought that two inscriptions bearing the name of Akshak were found there but after examination that proved not the case. Michael C. Astour placed it on the Tigris, on what is now the southern outskirts of Baghdad. A survey of the Diyala area showed no early remains in the area of Seleucia or Cteshiphon, apparently precluding that location.

Surveyed sites marked as possible locations of Akshak were Tell Mohammad, Tell Rishad, and Tell Abu Jawan. Tulul Mujaili' (also Tulül al-Mugeli' and el-Mjel'aat), which lies 15 kilometers northeast of Cteshiphon, has also been suggested as Akshak and also Opis. The site is 500 meters by 200 meters in area with a height of 6.5 meters. A surface survey showed occupation in Early Dynastic through Neo-Babylonian periods, mainly beginning in Kassite times. A kudurru of Marduk-nadin-ahhe (c. 1095–1078 BC), sixth king of the Second Dynasty of Isin and the 4th Dynasty of Babylon, was found there. Based on an early geographical list (Early Dynastic List of Geographical Names) the site of Tell Sinker(N 33.79723, E 44.32385), on the ancient bed of the Tigris river northwest of Baghdad, has also been proposed. Tell Sinker is site 16 (primarily Early Dynastic, 600 meters by 300 meters with a 250m x 100m x 10m central mound) in the Akkad Survey.

== List of rulers ==
The Sumerian King List (SKL) lists only six rulers for Akshak. The following list should not be considered complete:

| Portrait or inscription | Ruler | Approx. date and length of reign (Middle Chronology) | Comments, notes, and references for mentions |
|---|---|---|---|
Early Dynastic IIIb period (c. 2500 – c. 2340 BC)
| | Zuzu 𒍪𒍪 | Uncertain, fl. c. 2500 – c. 2340 BC | Historicity certain; temp. of Eannatum |
Akshak dynasty of Sumer (c. 2459 – c. 2360 BC)
"Then Kish was defeated and the kingship was taken to Akshak." — Sumerian King List (SKL)
| | Unzi 𒌦𒍣 | reigned c. 2459 – c. 2429 BC (30 years) | Historicity uncertain; temp. of Enshakushanna (?); Said on the Sumerian King List (SKL) to have held the title of, "King" of not just Akshak; but, to have held the "Kingship" over all of Sumer |
| | Undalulu 𒌦𒁕𒇻𒇻 | r. c. 2429 – c. 2417 BC (6 or 12 years) | Historicity uncertain; Known from the SKL; very little otherwise; Said on the SKL to have held the title of, "King" of not just Akshak; but, to have held the "Kingship" over all of Sumer |
| | Urur 𒌨𒌨 | r. c. 2417 – c. 2411 BC (6 years) | Historicity uncertain; Known from the SKL; very little otherwise; Said on the SKL to have held the title of, "King" of not just Akshak; but, to have held the "Kingship" over all of Sumer |
| | Puzur-Nirah 𒅤𒊭𒀭𒈲 | r. c. 2411 – c. 2391 BC (20 years) | Historicity uncertain; temp. of Kubaba (?); Said on the SKL to have held the title of, "King" of not just Akshak; but, to have held the "Kingship" over all of Sumer |
| | Ishu-Il 𒄿𒋗𒅋 | r. c. 2391 – c. 2367 BC (24 years) | Historicity uncertain; Known from the SKL; very little otherwise; Said on the SKL to have held the title of, "King" of not just Akshak; but, to have held the "Kingship" over all of Sumer |
| | Shu-Suen 𒋗𒀭𒂗𒍪 | r. c. 2367 – c. 2360 BC (7 or 24 years) | Son of Ishu-Il; temp. of Lugal-zage-si (?); Said on the SKL to have held the title of, "King" of not just Akshak; but, to have held the "Kingship" over all of Sumer |
"6 kings; they ruled for 99 years. Then the reign of Akshak was abolished and the kingship was taken to Kish." — SKL

== See also ==
- Cities of the ancient Near East
