= Manungal =

Mesopotamian goddess

Nungal
- Goddess of prisons
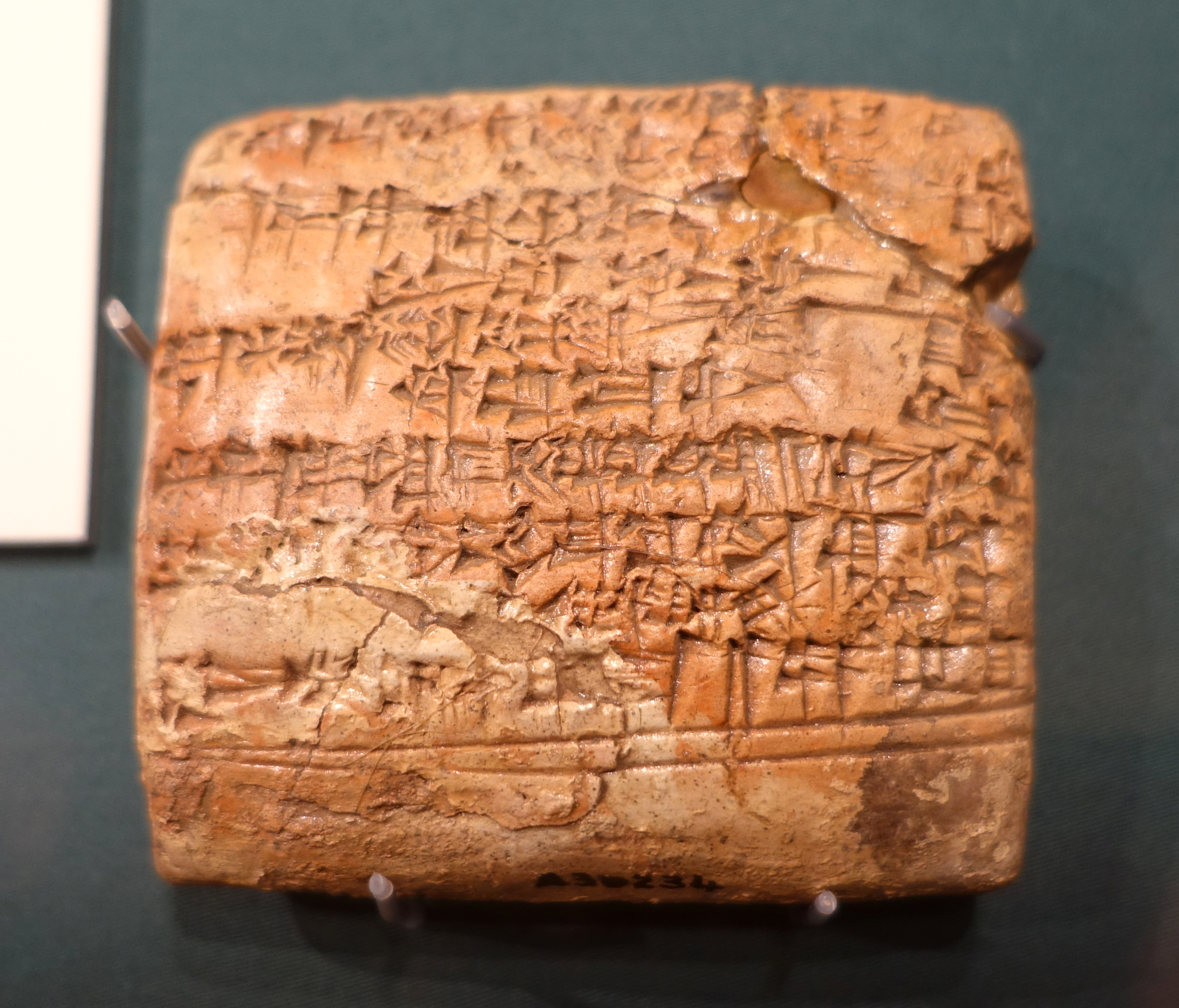
- A tablet with part of the hymn to Nungal inscribed. Oriental Institute Museum, University of Chicago
- Other names: Manungal
- Major cult center: Nippur

Genealogy
- Parents: Ereshkigal and Anu
- Consort: Birtum
- Children: Dullum

Equivalents
- Dilbat: Ninegal

Nungal (Sumerian: 𒀭𒎏𒃲 ^{d}Nun-gal, "great princess"), also known as Manungal and possibly Bēlet-balāṭi, was the Mesopotamian goddess of prisons, sometimes also associated with the underworld. She was worshiped especially in the Ur III period in cities such as Nippur, Lagash and Ur.

Her husband was Birtum, and she was regarded as a courtier and daughter in law Enlil. Texts also associate her with deities such as Ereshkigal, Nintinugga and Ninkasi.

Much of the available information about her role in Mesopotamian beliefs comes from a Sumerian hymn which was a part of the scribal curriculum in the Old Babylonian period.

== Name ==
Nungal's name means "Great Princess" in Sumerian. A plural form of the name attested in some documents can be regarded as analogous to one of the collective terms for Mesopotamian deities, Igigi.

An alternate form of the name, Manungal, was possibly a contraction of the phrase ama Nungal, "mother Nungal." It is first attested in documents from the Ur III period, while in later times it commonly appears in place of the base form in texts written in Akkadian or in the Emesal dialect of Sumerian. A number of variant spellings of the name are attested in sources from Ugarit, for example ^{d}Nun-gal-la, ^{d}Ma-ga-la, ^{d}Ma-nun-gal-la or ^{d}Ma-nun-gal-an-na.

In the hymn Nungal in the Ekur, and in a fragment of an otherwise unknown composition, Ninegal functions as an epithet of Nungal. This name is otherwise attested either as an epithet of various goddesses, especially Inanna, or as an independent minor deity, associated with royal palaces.

It is possible that Bēlet-balāṭi, "mistress of life," a goddess known from sources from the first millennium BCE, was a late form of Manungal.

== Character ==
Jeremiah Peterson describes punishment and detention as the primary domain of Nungal. Her character is described in the hymn Nungal in the Ekur, known from a large number of Old Babylonian copies thanks to its role in the scribal school curriculum. Miguel Civil proposed that it was originally composed by a scribe accused of a crime which would warrant a severe penalty. It describes the fate of those who find themselves under the auspice of Nungal. According to this composition, the prison maintained by this goddess separates the guilty from the innocent, but also gives the former a chance to be redeemed, which is metaphorically compared to refining silver and to being born. The text likely reflected views about the idealized purpose and results of imprisonment, a punishment well attested in Mesopotamian records. The use of temporary imprisonment as part of the judicial process meant to help with determining if a person is guilty is also attested in the Code of Ur-Nammu.

Despite being the goddess of prisons, Nungal was regarded as a compassionate deity. Imprisonment was presumably viewed as compassionate compared to the death penalty, and it is likely that the goddess was regarded as capable of reducing the most severe punishments. She was also portrayed in various less fearsome roles, for example as a goddess of justice or as one associated with medicine and perhaps birth.

Nungal was also an underworld goddess, as evidenced by her association with Ereshkigal and by the epithet Ninkurra, "lady of the underworld," applied to her in incantations.

== Worship ==
Wilfred G. Lambert proposed that originally Manungal and her spouse Birtum were worshiped in a presently unknown city which declined in the third millennium BCE, leading to the transfer of its tutelary deities to Nippur. An analogous process likely occurred also when it comes to other deities, such as Nisaba, whose cult was transferred from Eresh, which disappears from records after the Ur III period, to Nippur.

While Nungal is already attested in the Early Dynastic god list from Fara, worship of her is best attested in the Ur III period, when she was worshiped in Lagash, Nippur, Umma, Susa, Ur and possibly Uruk. In Nippur she was worshiped as one of the deities belonging to the court and family of Enlil, while in Ur she received offerings as one of the members of the circle of Gula instead. A single attestation of Nungal receiving offerings in an Inanna temple, alongside Anu, Ninshubur, Nanaya, Geshtinanna and Dumuzi is known too. There are also records of offerings being made to her alongside Inanna, Ninegal and Annunitum.

According to Miguel Civil, it is unlikely that the Ekur mentioned in the Hymn to Nungal was one and the same as the temple of Enlil in Nippur, contrary to early assumptions in scholarship. Other locations proposed for it include the Egalmah temple in Ur, or the city of Lagash.

In the Old Babylonian period she was also worshiped in Sippar, where she had a temple, as well as a city gate named in her honor, and possibly in Dilbat. In the last location there was a temple known as Esapar, "house of the net," dedicated to Ninegal. However, in a document listing various temples Esapar is instead said to be the name of a temple of Nungal, with no location listed. Due to the existence of a well attested association between these two goddesses it is possible that there was only one Esapar.

Under the name Bēlet-balāṭi Nungal continued to be worshiped in Nippur in the first millennium BCE, for example in the temple of the local goddess Ninimma. She is also attested in sources linked to Babylon, Borsippa, Der and Uruk. According to an economic document from the late first millennium BCE, in the last of those cities she was worshiped in the temple Egalmah (Sumerian: "exalted palace"), which instead appears in association with Ninisina in an inscription of king Sîn-kāšid from the Old Babylonian period. In the so-called "Standard Babylonian" version of the Epic of Gilgamesh it is described as a temple of Ninsun. According to Andrew R. George, it is possible to reconcile the different accounts by assuming all three of these goddesses were connected with Gula and possibly functioned as her manifestations.

Theophoric names invoking Nungal are known from records from the Ur III period, one example being Ur-Manungal.

== Associations with other deities ==
Nungal's spouse was Birtum, whose name means "fetter" or "shackle" in Akkadian. While the word is grammatically feminine, the deity was regarded as male. Birtum also appears among underworld gods linked to Nergal in god lists. As Nungal is called a daughter in law of Enlil, Birtum was likely his son. Nungal was also called the "true stewardess of Enlil," agrig-zi-^{d}En-lil-lá. In the god list An = Anum the deity Dullum, whose name has been translated as "serfdom" ("Frondienst") by Antoine Cavigneaux and Manfred Krebernik, appears as Nungal's son. According to the Hymn to Nungal, her mother is Ereshkigal, while her father is Anu, though it is possible the later statement is not literal.

Various courtiers of Nungal are attested in Sumerian and Akkadian texts. Her sukkal (attendant deity) was Nindumgul ("lady/lord mooring pole"), possibly regarded as a female deity. She appears to play the role of a prosecutor in the Hymn to Nungal. Another of her courtiers was Igalimma, a god who originated as a son of Ningirsu in the pantheon of Lagash. The deity Eḫ (Akkadian: Uplum), a deification of the louse, also appears in her circle, for example in the Nippur god list. It is also assumed that the goddess Bizila, associated with the love goddess Nanaya, occurs in the court of Nungal in some sources too, though Jeremiah Peterson considers it possible that there might have been two deities with similar names, one associated with Nungal and the other with Nanaya.

In the Isin, An = Anum and Weidner god lists Nungal is classified as one of the underworld deities. A fragmentary literary texts associates her with Nintinugga and Ereshkigal. With the exception of Nungal in the Ekur and this fragment she is very rare in known works of Mesopotamian literature. The Weidner god list places the beer deities Ninkasi and Siraš between Maungal and Laṣ, the wife of Nergal, who was also a deity associated with the underworld. Similarly, the goddess ^{d}KAŠ.DIN.NAM, most likely to be read as Kurunnītu, who is assumed to be a late form of Ninkasi appears in association with Bēlet-balāṭi. It has been proposed that the possible connection between beer and underworld deities was meant to serve as a reflection of negative effects of alcohol consumption.

The text Nin-Isina and the Gods appears to syncretise Nungal with the eponymous goddess. Similarly, Bēlet-balāṭi is attested as a form or member of the entourage of another medicine goddess, Gula.

Nungal appears in the description of a cultic journey of Pabilsag to Lagash. It has been proposed that he was associated with her as a judge deity, but it is also possible that he acquired a connection to the underworld because of her.
