= Eannatum =

Eannatum 𒂍𒀭𒈾𒁺
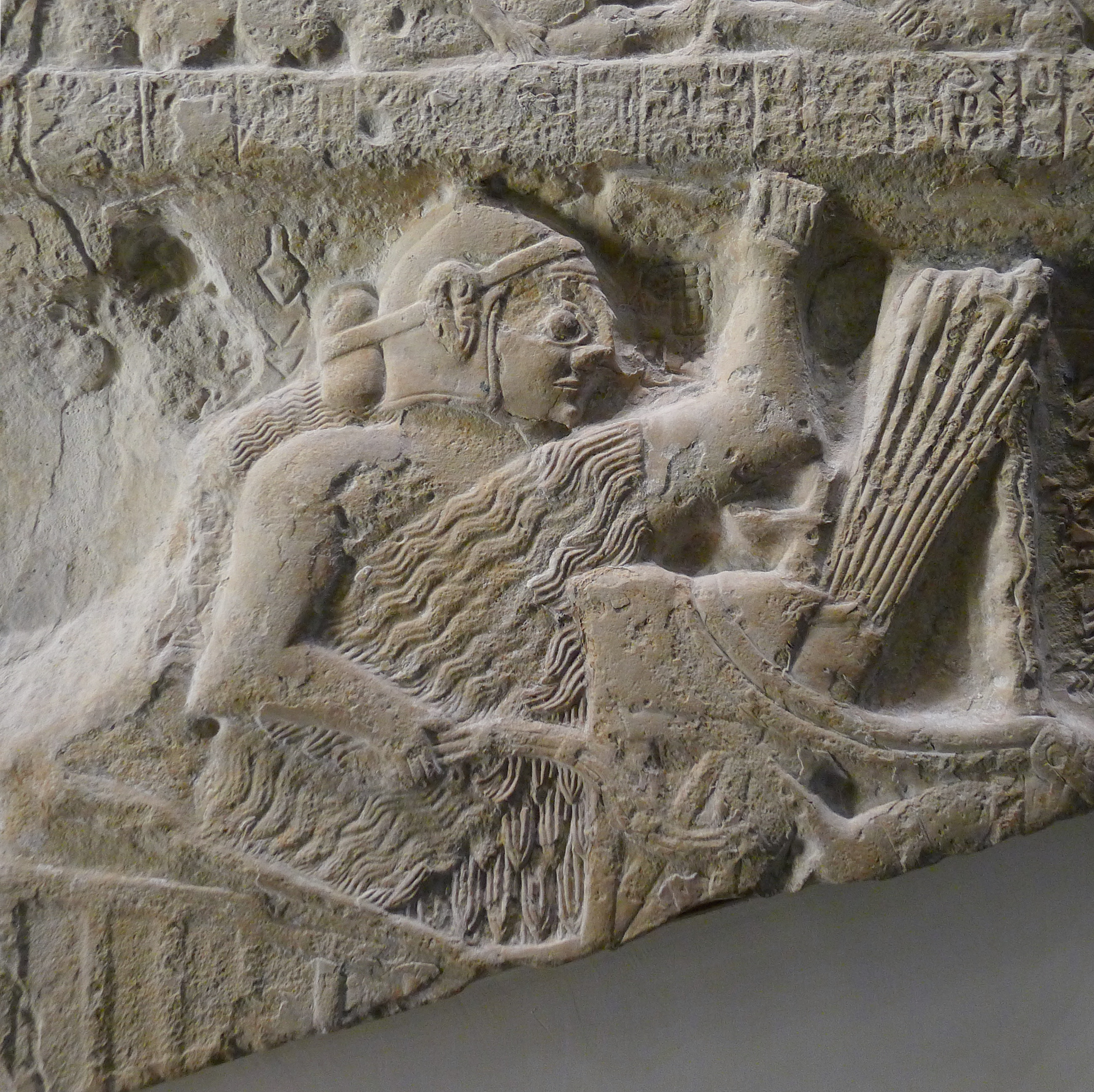
- Eannatum, King of Lagash, riding a war chariot (detail of the Stele of the Vultures). His name "Eannatum" (𒂍𒀭𒈾𒁺) is written vertically in two columns in front of his head. Louvre Museum.

King of Lagash
- Reign: c. 2450 BC
- Predecessor: Possibly Akurgal
- Successor: Enannatum I
- Dynasty: 1st Dynasty of Lagash
- Father: Akurgal

Eannatum (Sumerian: 𒂍𒀭𒈾𒁺 É.AN.NA-tum_{2}; fl. c. 2450 BC) was a Sumerian Ensi (ruler or king) of Lagash. He established one of the first verifiable empires in history, subduing Elam and destroying the city of Susa, and extending his domain over the rest of Sumer and Akkad. One inscription found on a boulder states that Eannatum was his Sumerian name, while his "Tidnu" (Amorite) name was Lumma.

== Conquest of Sumer ==
Eannatum, grandson of Ur-Nanshe and son of Akurgal, was a king of Lagash who conquered all of Sumer, including Ur, Nippur, Akshak (controlled by Zuzu), Larsa, and Uruk (controlled by Enshakushanna, who is on the King List).

He entered into conflict with Umma, waging a war over the fertile plain of Gu-Edin. He personally commanded an army to subjugate the city-state, and vanquished Ush, the ruler of Umma, finally making a boundary treaty with Enakalle, successor of Ush, as described in the Stele of the Vultures and in the Cone of Entemena:

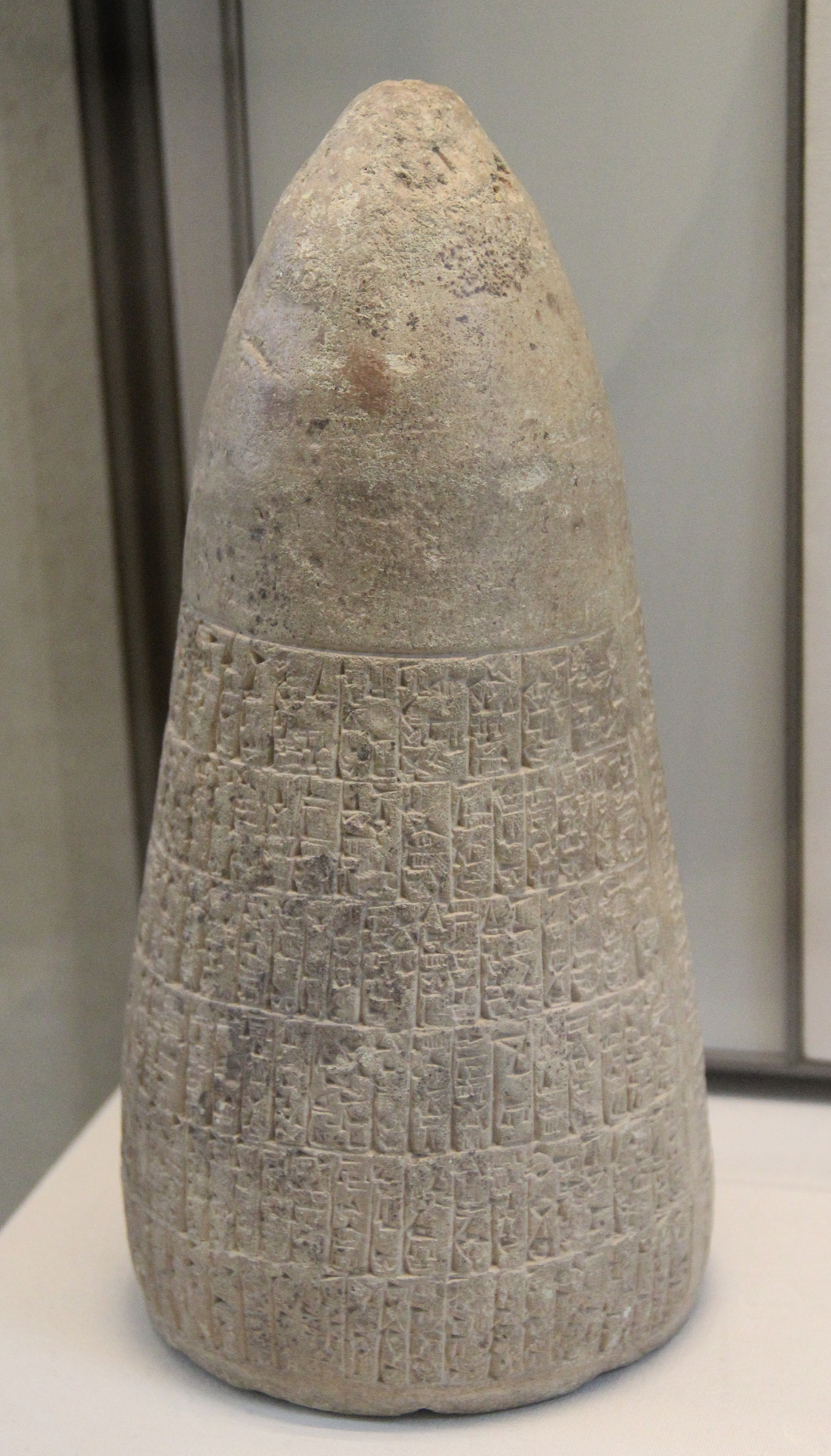

32–38

𒂍𒀭𒈾𒁺 𒉺𒋼𒋛 𒉢𒁓𒆷𒆠 𒉺𒄑𒉋𒂵 𒂗𒋼𒈨𒈾 𒉺𒋼𒋛 𒉢𒁓𒆷𒆠𒅗𒆤
e_{2}-an-na-tum_{2} ensi_{2} lagaš^{ki} pa-bil_{3}-ga en-mete-na ensi_{2} lagaš^{ki}-ka-ke_{4}
"Eannatum, ruler of Lagash, uncle of Entemena, ruler of Lagash"
39–42
𒂗𒀉𒆗𒇷 𒉺𒋼𒋛 𒄑𒆵𒆠𒁕 𒆠 𒂊𒁕𒋩
en-a_{2}-kal-le ensi_{2} umma^{ki}-da ki e-da-sur
"fixed the border with Enakalle, ruler of Umma"
Extract from the Cone of Enmetena, Room 236 Reference AO 3004, Louvre Museum.

Location of Lagash

Eannatum made Umma a tributary, where every person had to pay a certain amount of grain into the treasury of the goddess Nina and the god Ingurisa.

== Conquest outside Sumer ==
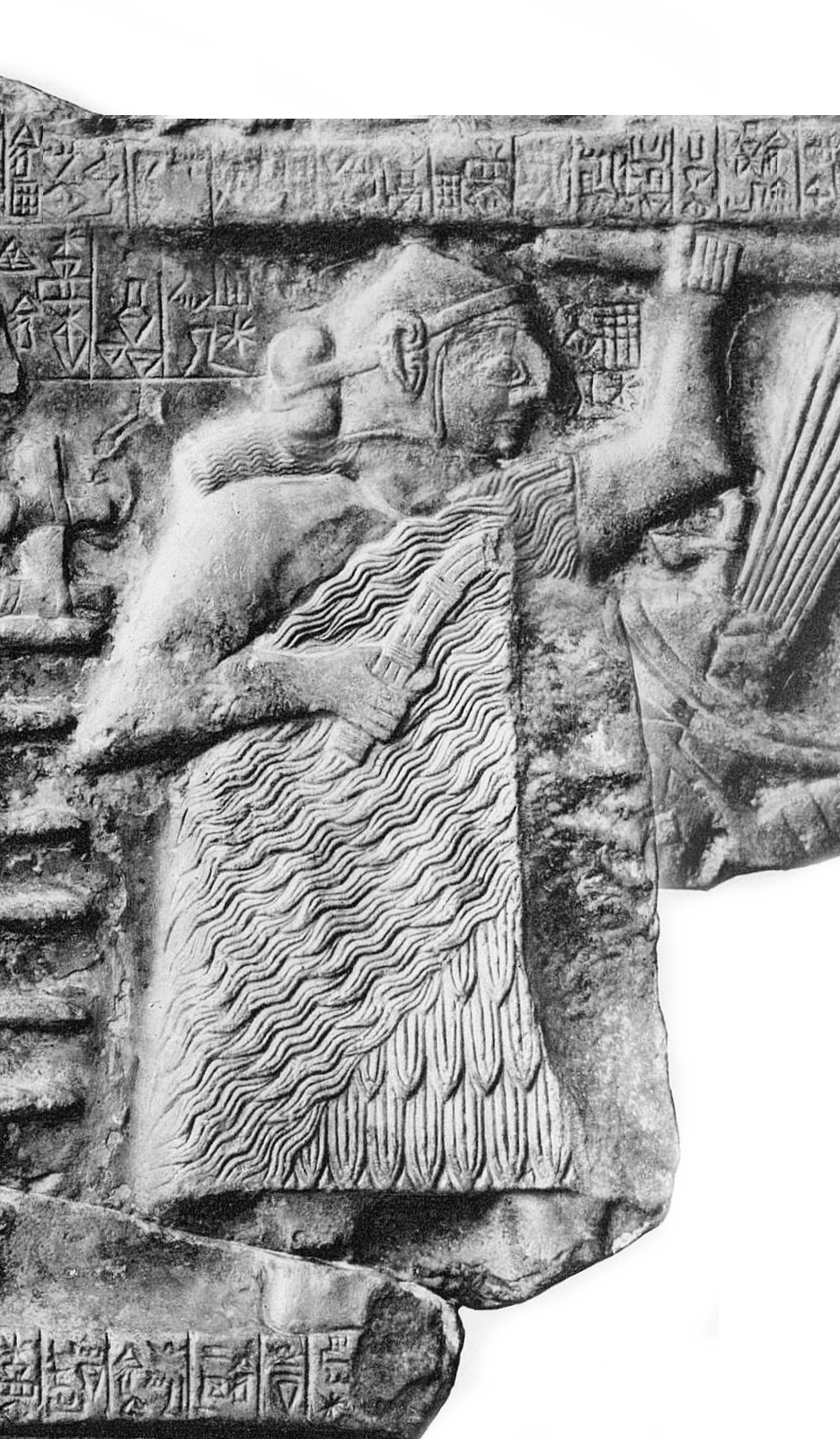
Eannatum of Lagash in full dress, reconstitution

Eannatum expanded his influence beyond the boundaries of Sumer. He conquered parts of Elam, including the city Az off the coast of the modern Persian Gulf, allegedly smote Shubur, and, having repulsed Akshak, he claimed the title of "King of Kish" (which regained its independence after his death) and demanded tribute as far as Mari:

"He (Eannatum) defeated Zuzu, the king of Akshak, from the Antasurra of Ningirsu up to Akshak and destroyed him."

"The king of Akshak ran back to his land."
"He defeated Kish, Akshak, and Mari from the Antasurra of Ningirsu."
"To Eannatum, the ruler of Lagash, Inanna gave the kingship of Kish in addition to ensi-ship of Lagash, because she loved him."

— Inscriptions of Eannatum.

Eannatum recorded his victories on a stone inscription:

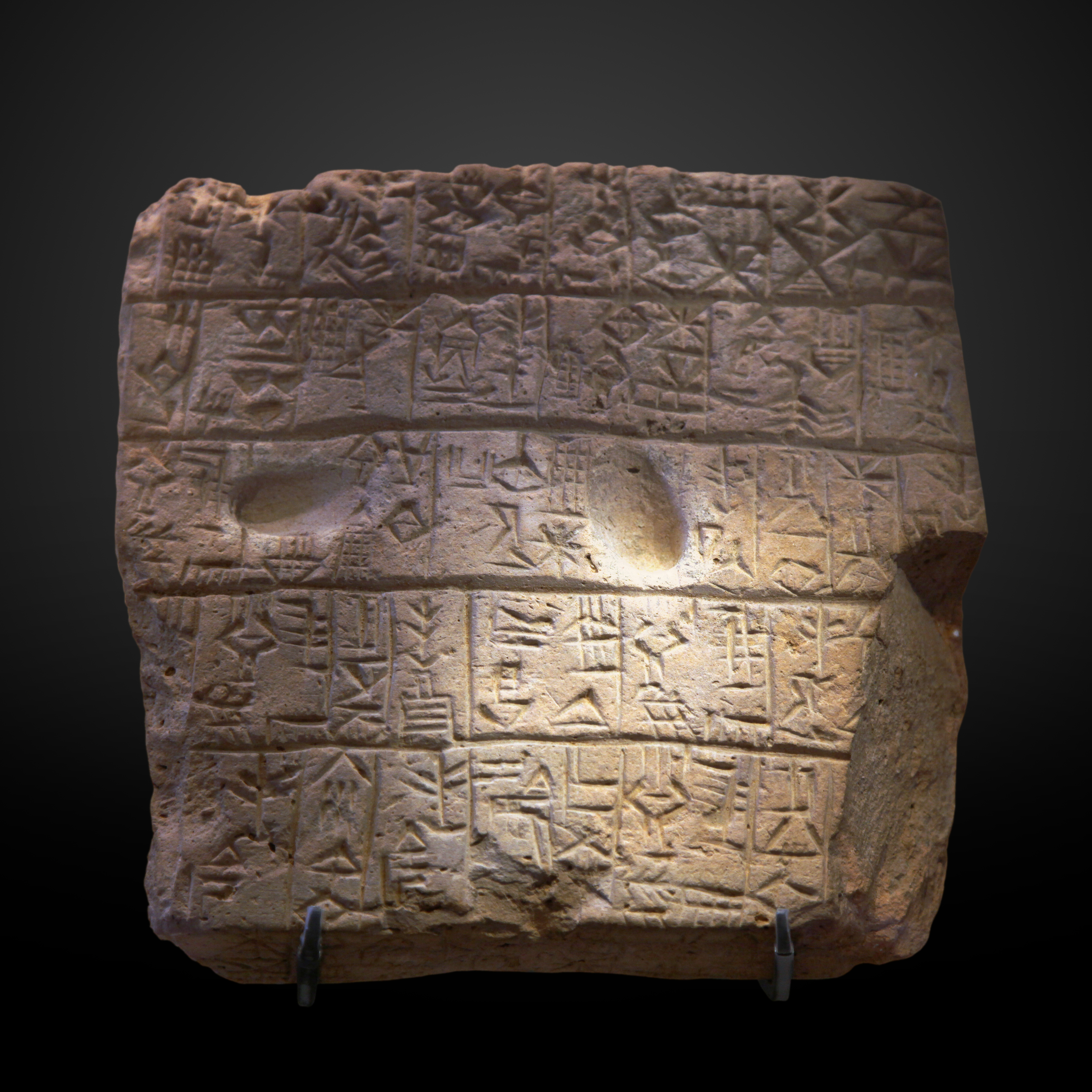

Eannatum, the ensi of Lagash, who was granted might by Enlil, who constantly is nourished by Ninhursag with her milk, whose name Ningirsu had pronounced, who was chosen by Nanshe in her heart, the son of Akurgal, the ensi of Lagash, conquered the land of Elam, conquered Urua, conquered Umma, conquered Ur. At that time, he built a well made of baked bricks for Ningirsu, in his wide temple courtyard. Eananatum's god is Shulutula. Then did Ningirsu love Eannatum".

— Brick of Eannatum-AO 351, Louvre Museum

However, revolts often arose in parts of his empire. During Eannatum’s reign, many temples and palaces were built, especially in Lagash. The city of Nina, which has been identified with the site of Tell-Zurghul, was rebuilt, with many canals and reservoirs being excavated.

== Stele of the Vultures ==
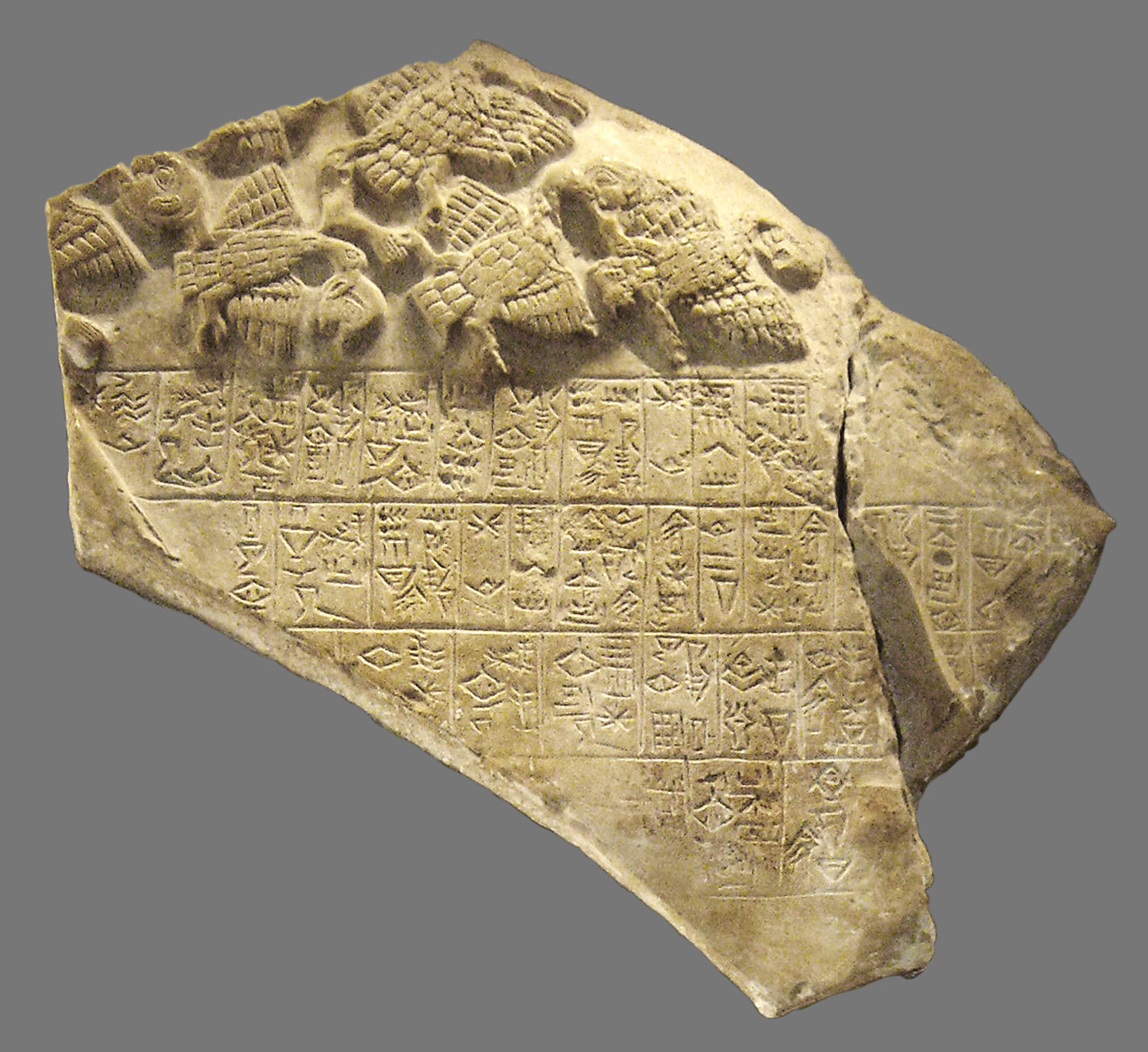
A fragment of the Stele of the Vultures showing vultures with severed human heads in their beaks and a fragment of cuneiform script

The so-called Stele of the Vultures, now in the Louvre, is a fragmented limestone stele found in Telloh, (ancient Girsu) Iraq, in 1881. The stele is reconstructed as having been 1.8 metres (5 ft 11 in) high and 1.3 metres (4 ft 3 in) wide and was set up c. 2450 BCE. It was erected as a monument of the victory of Eannatum of Lagash over Ush, king of Umma, leading to a boundary treaty with his successor Enakalle of Umma.

On it, various incidents in the war are represented. In one register, the king (his name appears inscribed around his head) stands in front of his phalanx of heavily armoured soldiers, with a curved weapon in his right hand, formed of three bars of metal bound together by rings. In another register a figure, the king, his name again inscribed around his head, rides on his chariot in the thick of the battle, while his kilted followers, with helmets on their heads and lances in their hands, march behind him.

On the other side of the stele is an image of Ninurta, a god of war, holding the captive Ummaites in a large net. This implies that Eannatum attributed his victory to Ninurta, and thus that he was in the god's protection (though some accounts say that he attributed his victory to Enlil, the patron deity of Lagash).

The victory of Eannatum is mentioned in a fragmentary inscription on the stele, suggesting that after the loss of 3,600 soldiers on the field, Ush, king of Umma, was killed in a rebellion in his capital city of Umma: “[…] (Eannatum) defeated him. Its (Umma’s) 3,600 corpses reached the base of heaven [...] raised (their) hands against him and killed him in Umma.”.

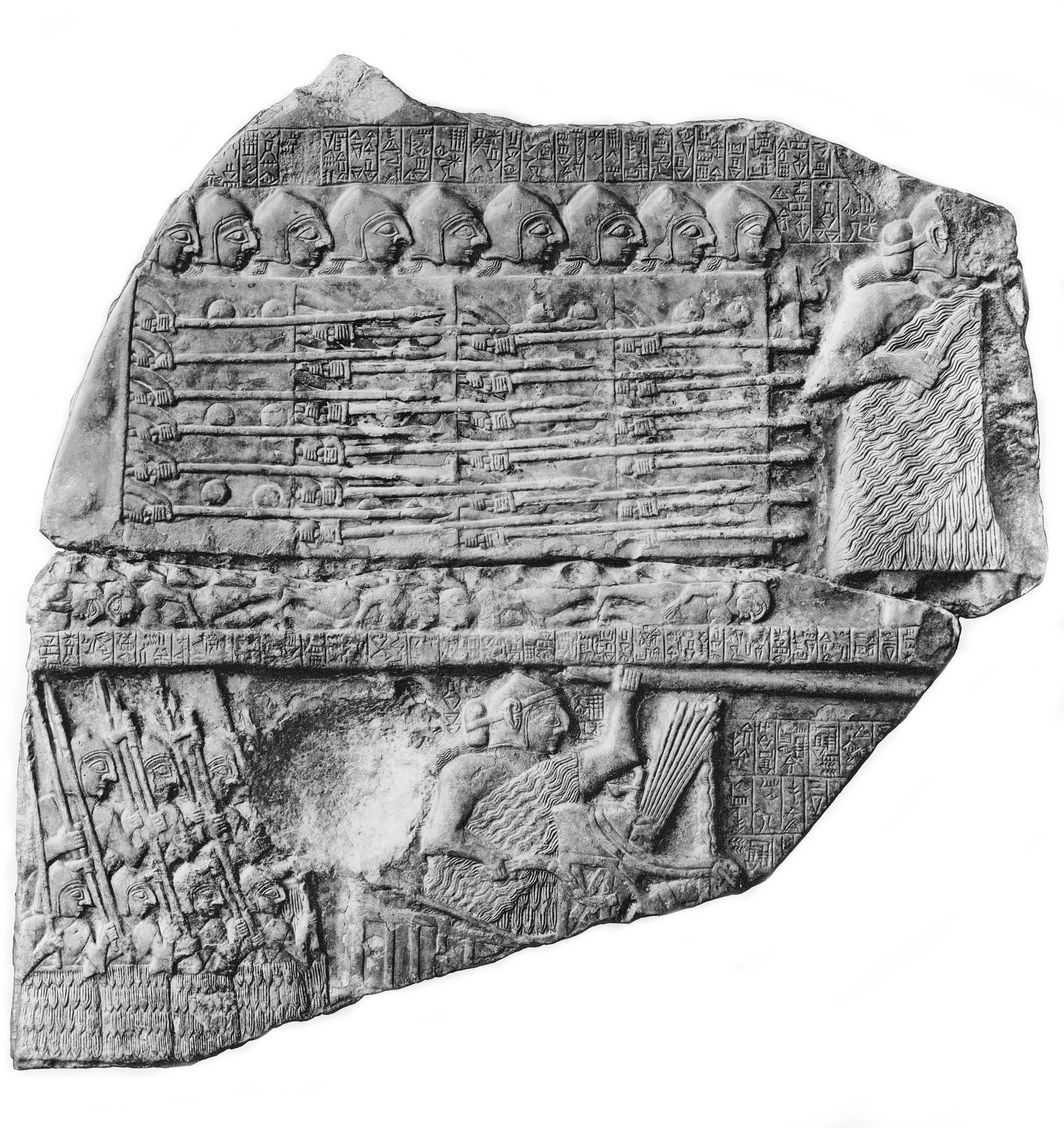
Eannatum leading his troops in battle. Top: Eannatum leading a phalanx on foot. Bottom: Eannatum leading troops in a war chariot. Fragment of the Stele of the Vultures

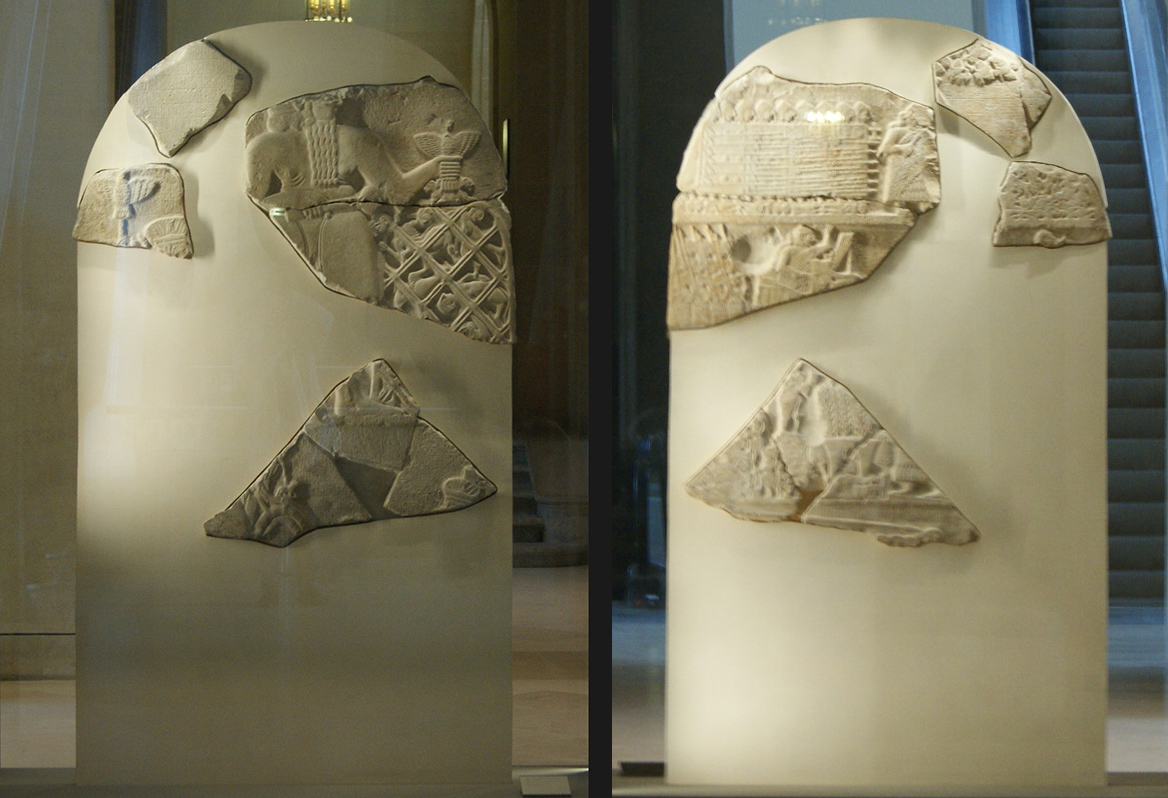
Stele of the Vultures.

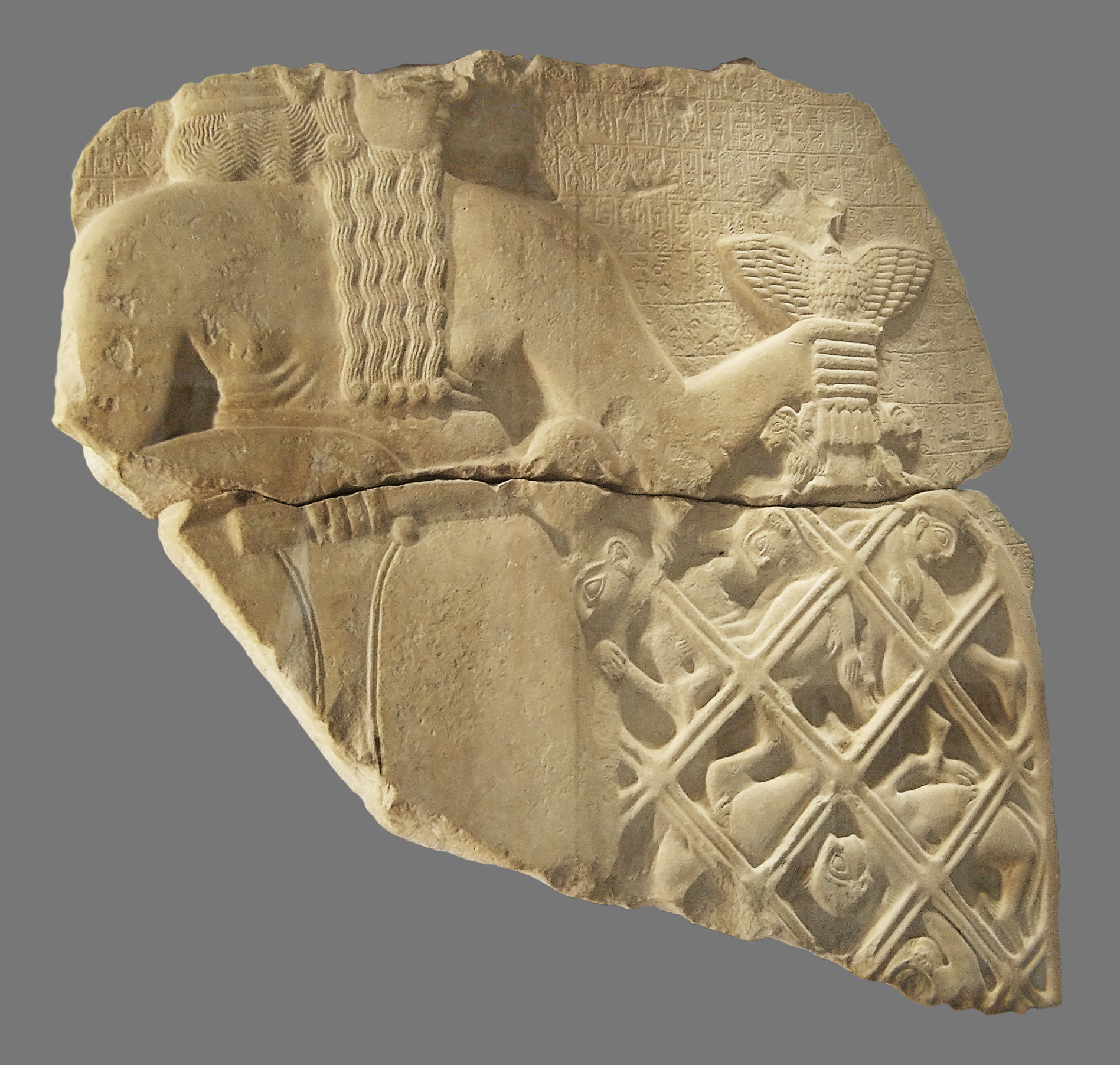
Upper register of the "mythological" side

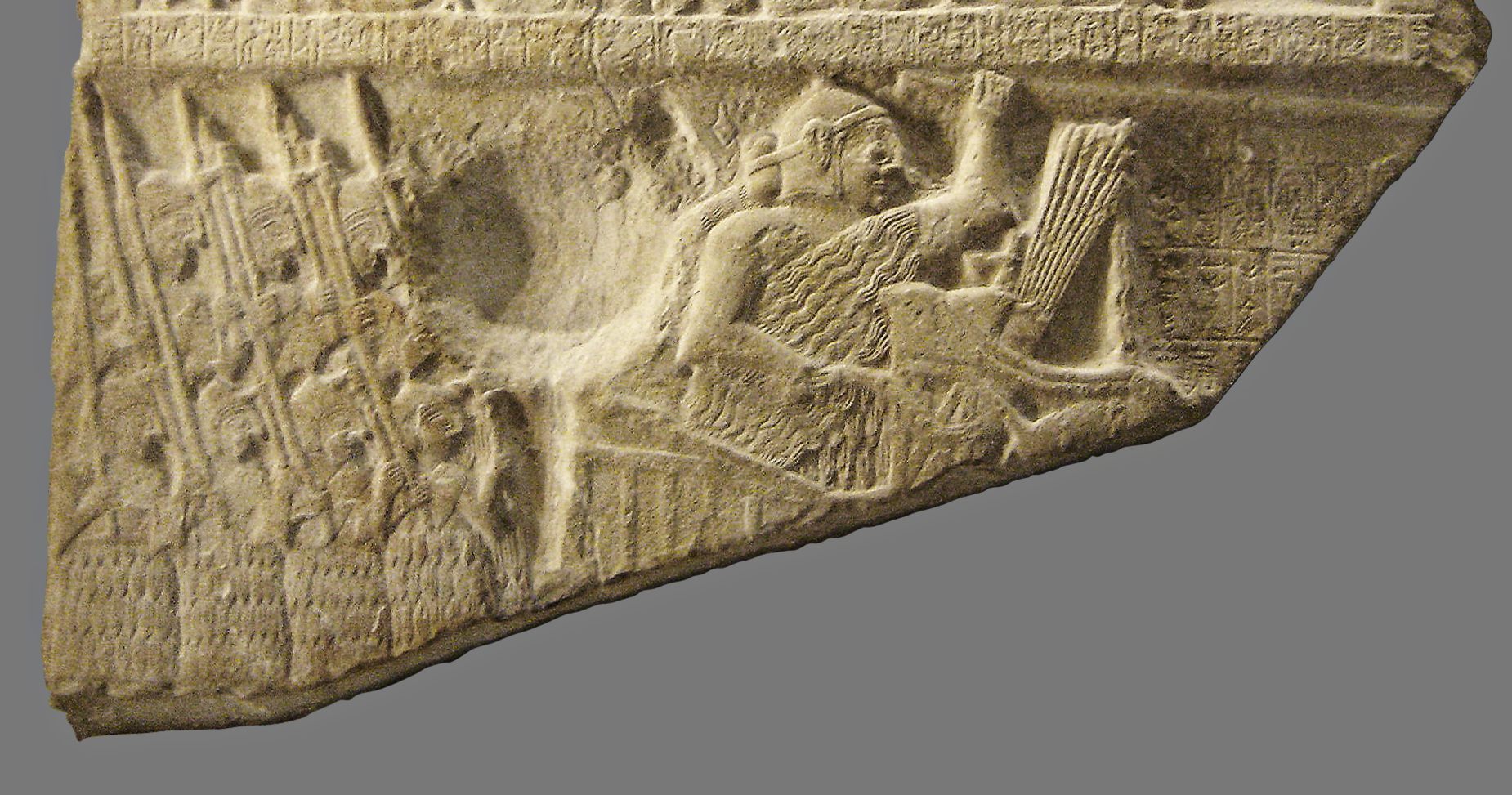
Detail of the "battle" fragment

== Other inscriptions ==
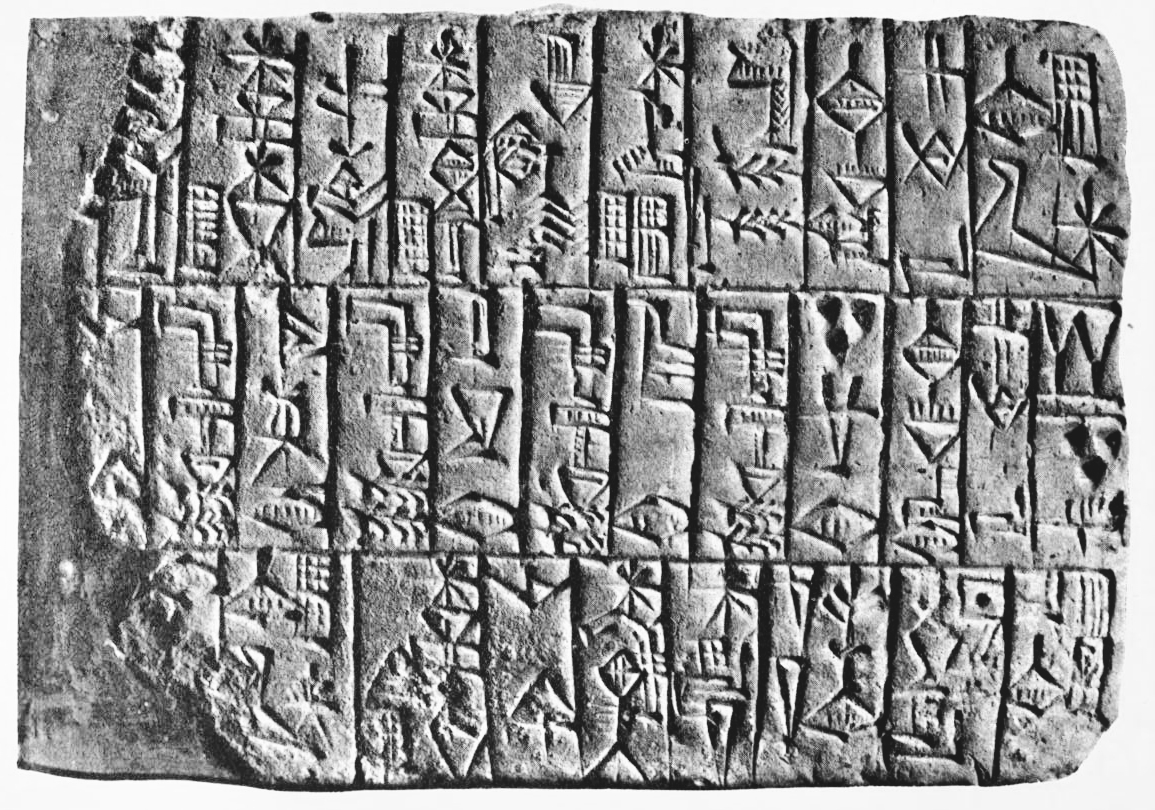
Inscribed brick of Eannatum, recording the sinking of a well in the forecourt of the Temple of Ningirsu in Lagash.

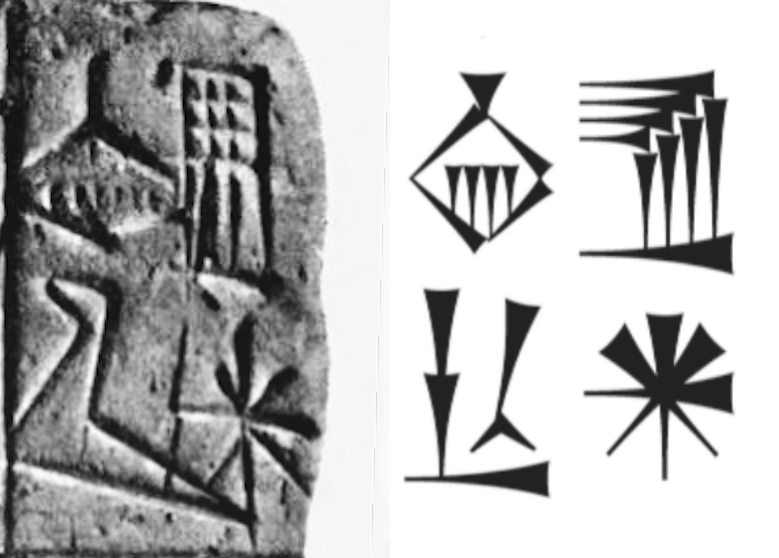
Name of Eannatum on his Ningirsu inscription (top right corner).

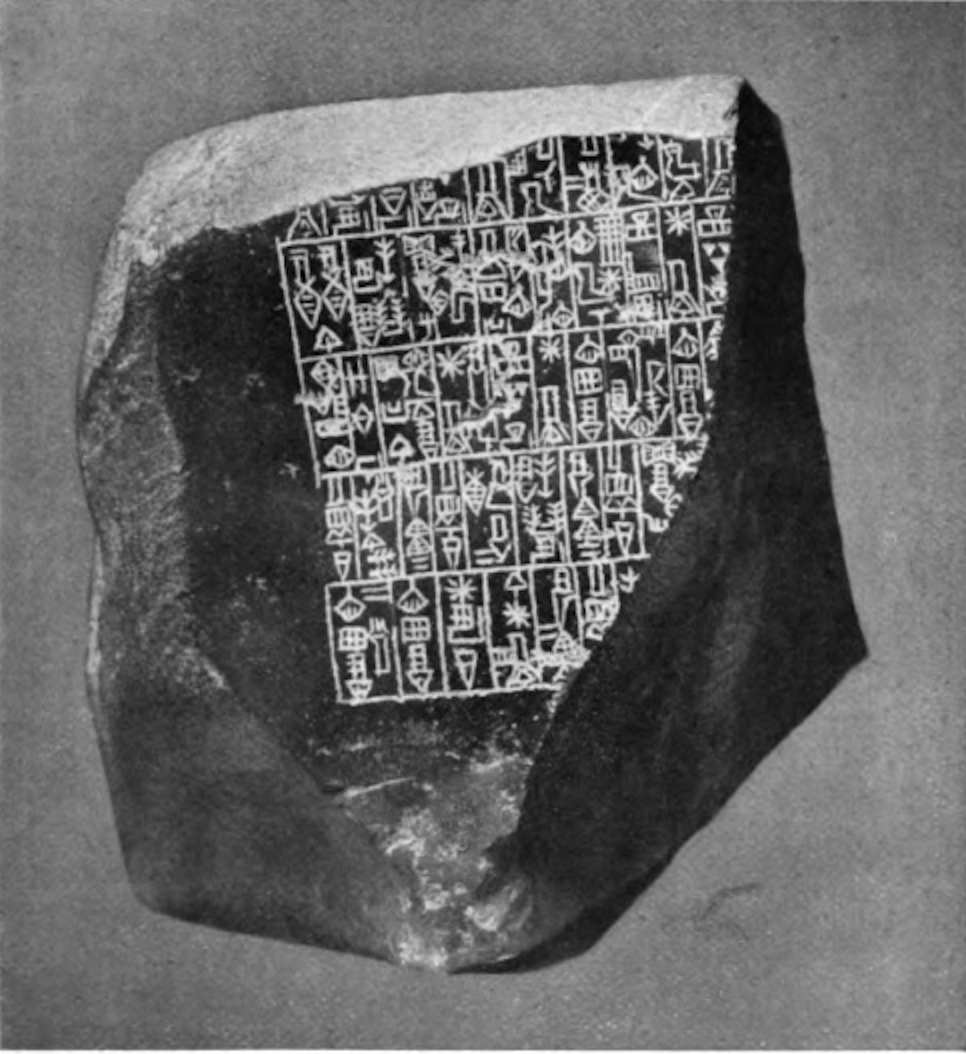
Eannatum inscription (British Museum)

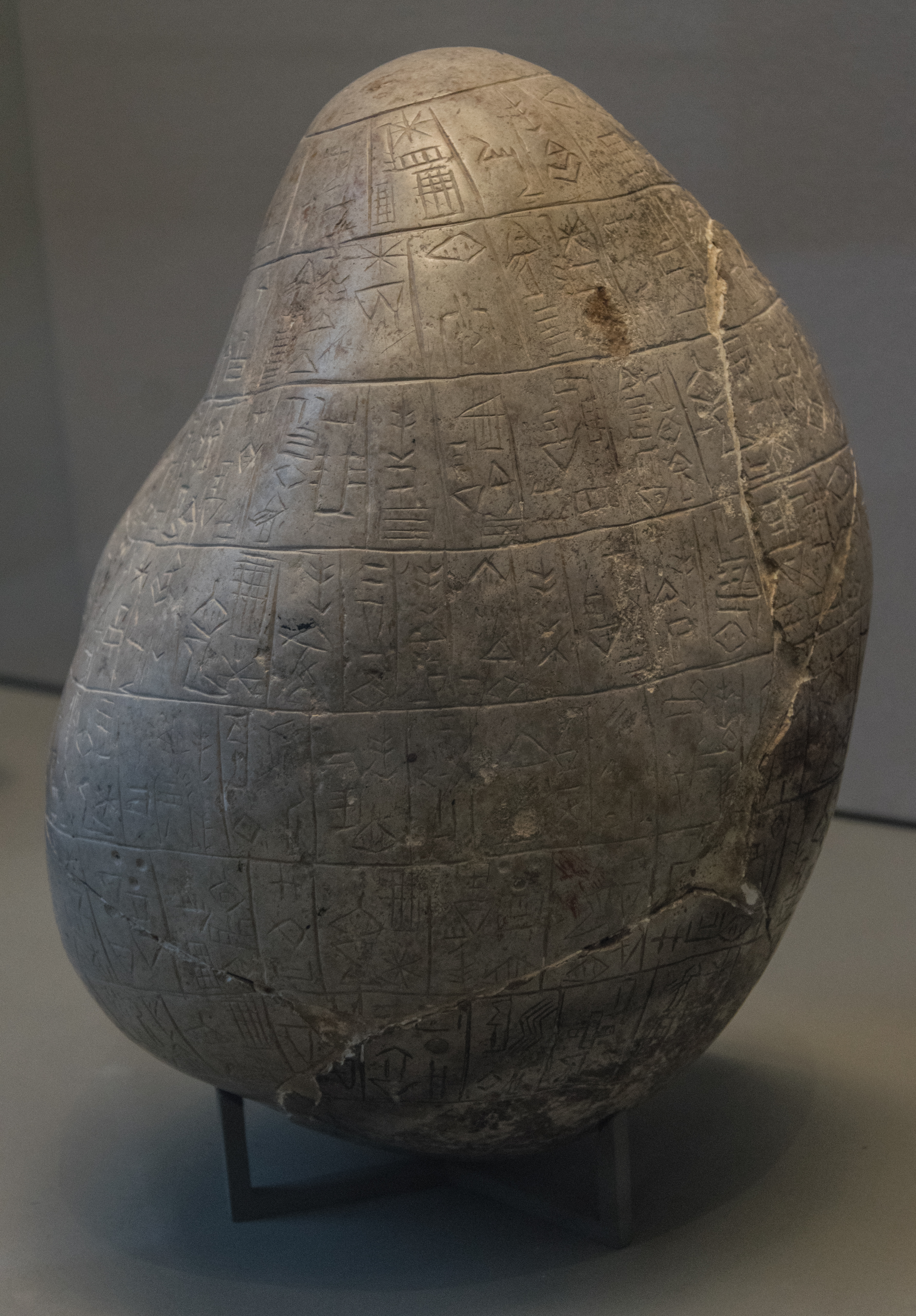
A foundation stone of Eannatum, dedicated to Ningirsu, tutelary god of Lagash. It enumerates the victories of Eannatum from Elam to Akshak. Louvre Museum.

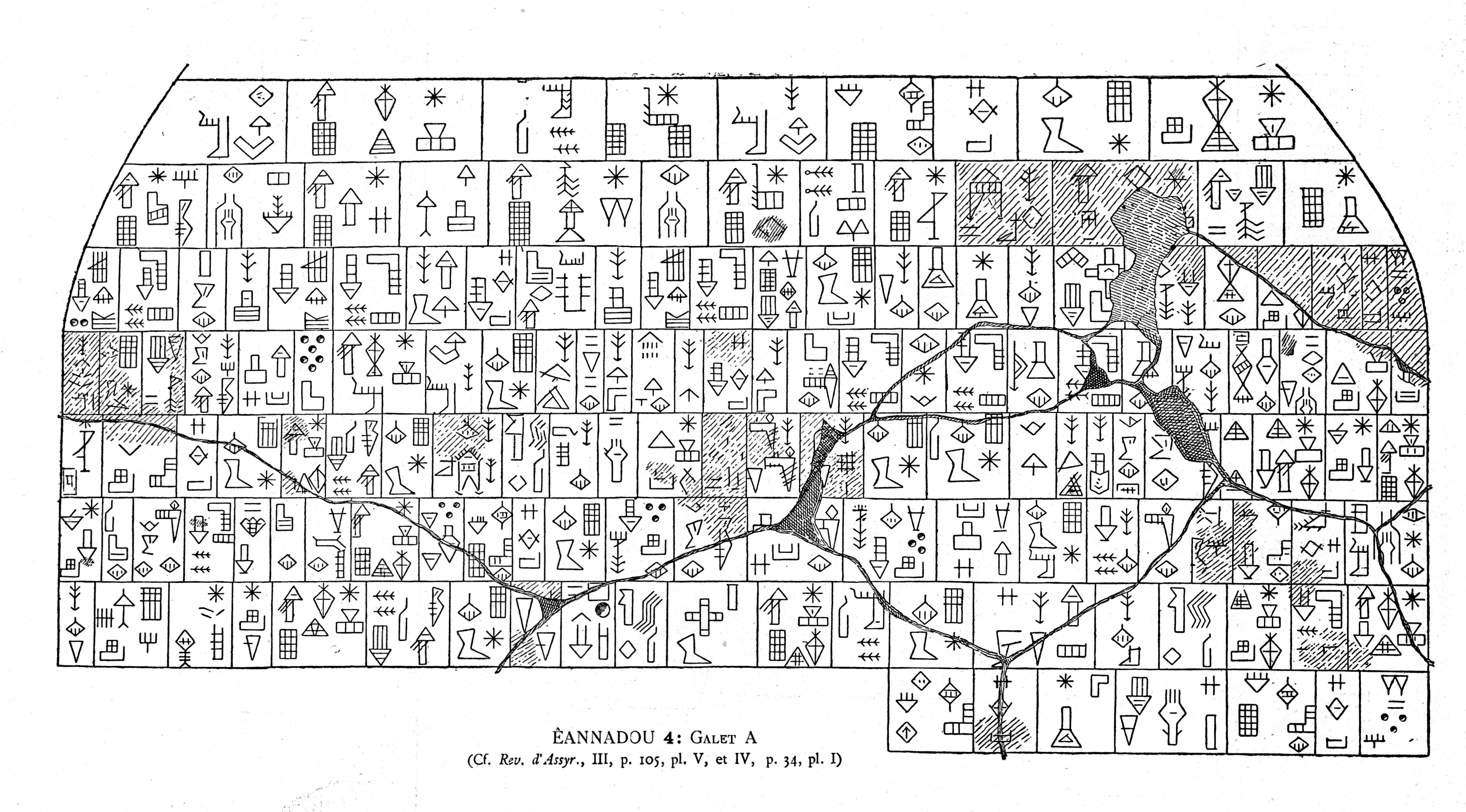
Foundation stone of Eannatum (transcription)

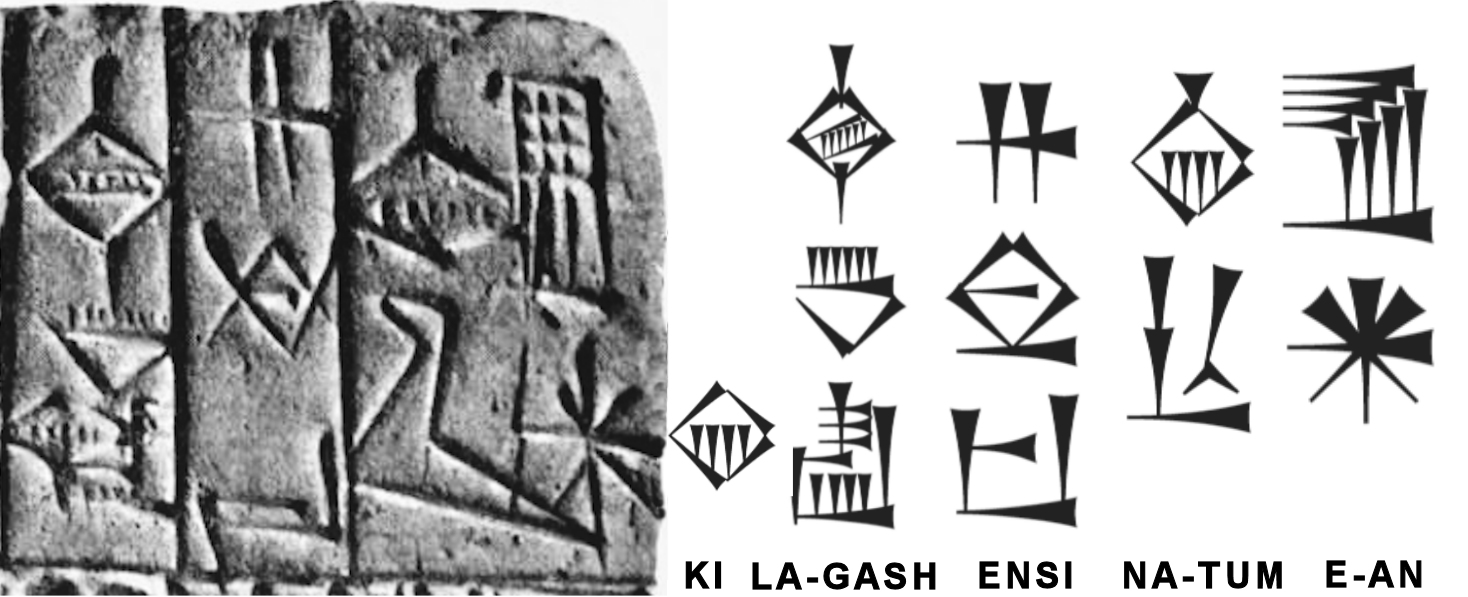
Inscription Eannatum Ensi Lagashki "Eannatum, ensi of Lagash"

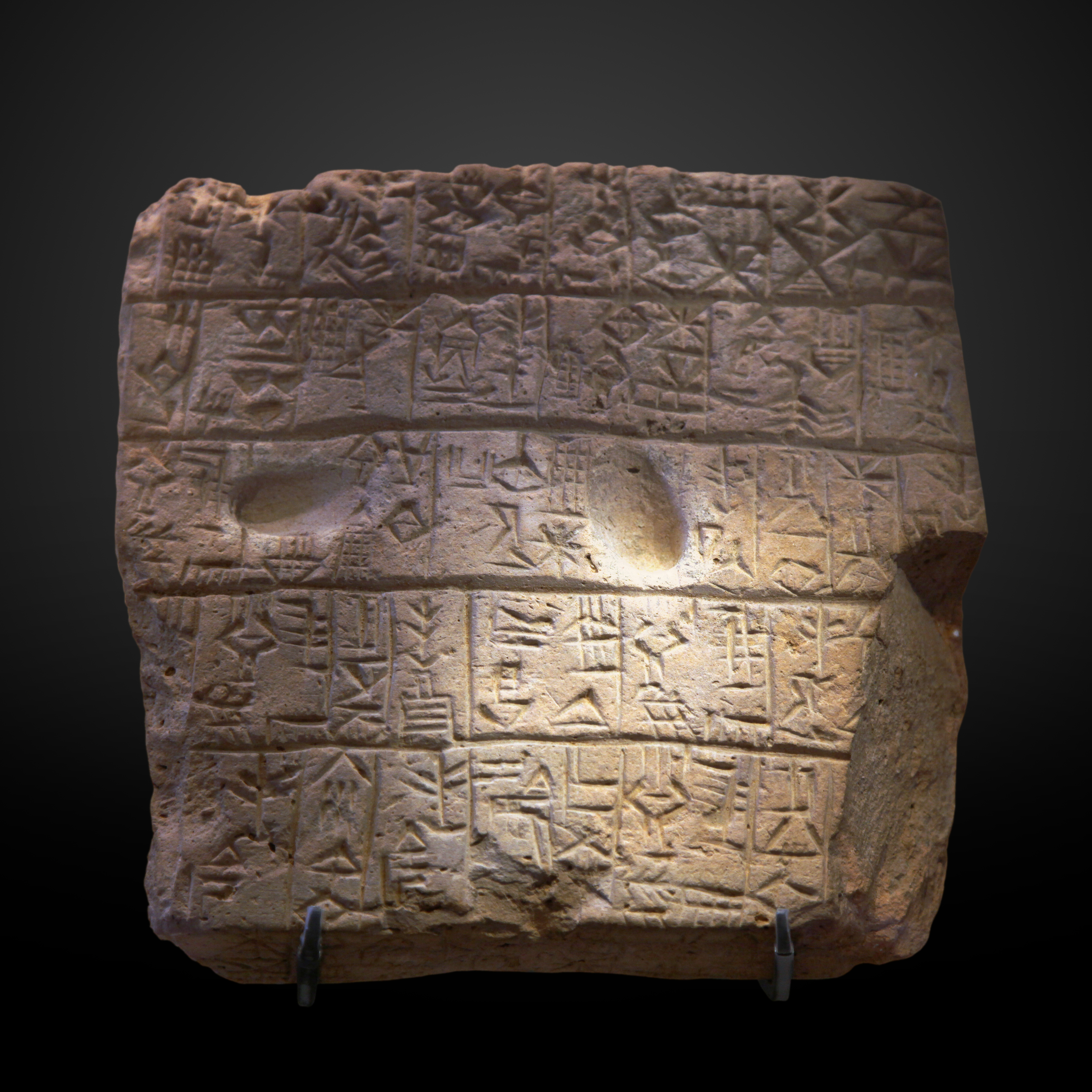
Eannatum describes his victories over the countries of Elam, Urua, Umma and Ur, and well as the construction of a brick well in front of the temple of Ningirsu.

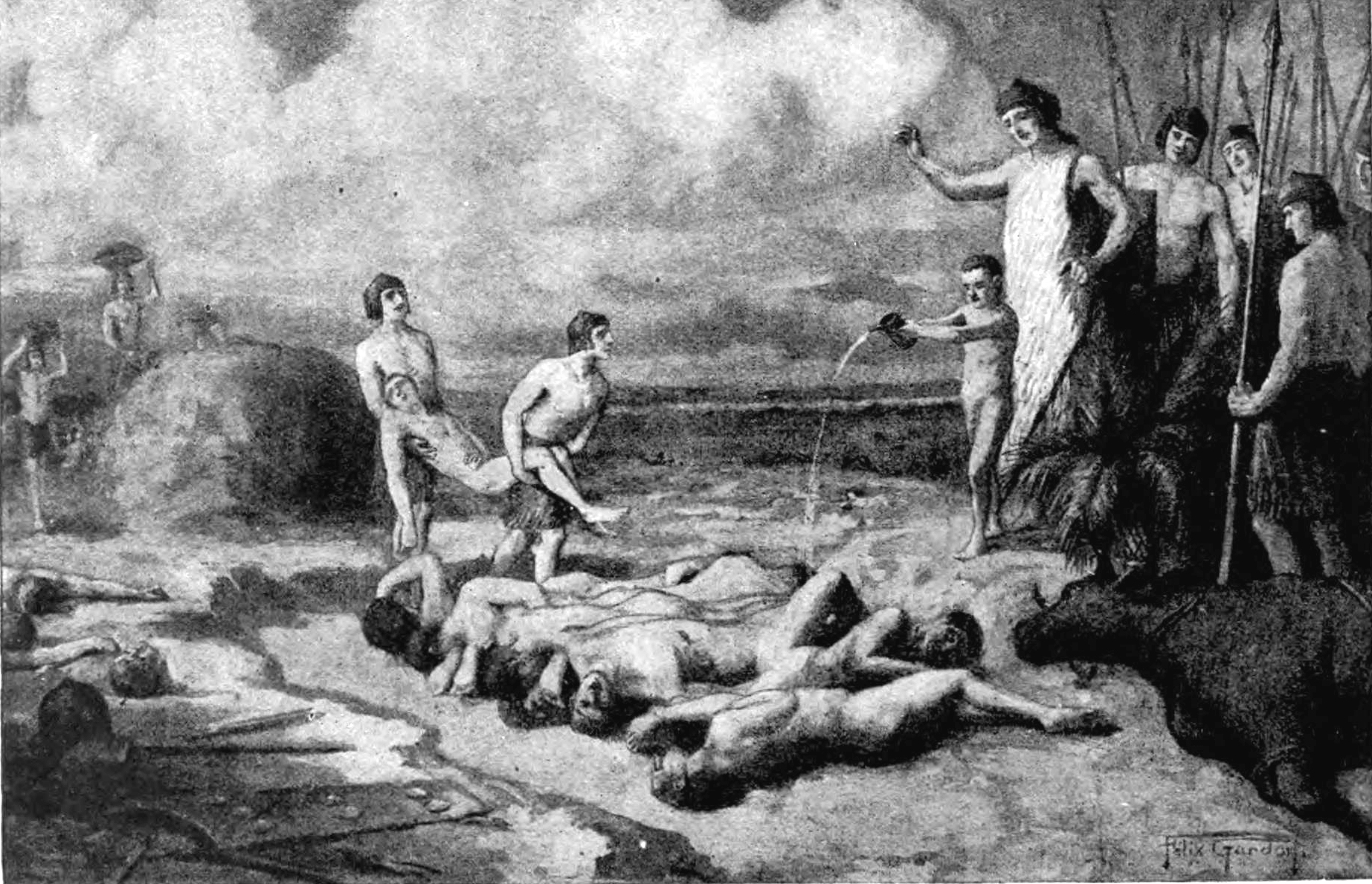
Eannatum King of Lagash presiding at funeral rites on the battlefield (20th century reconstitution)

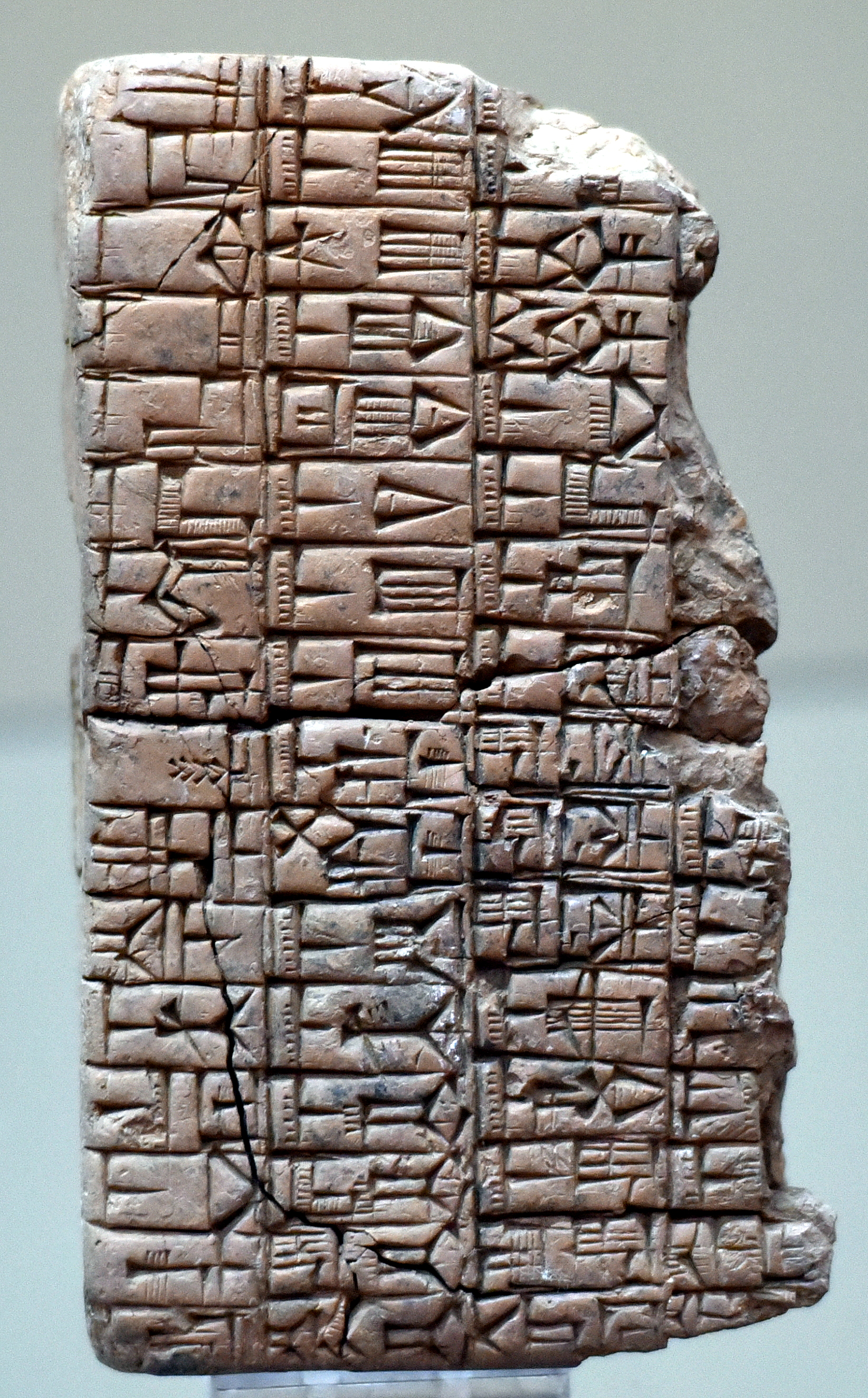
Clay tablet mentioning the name of Eannatum, prince of Lagash. From Iraq, c. 2470 BCE. Iraq Museum

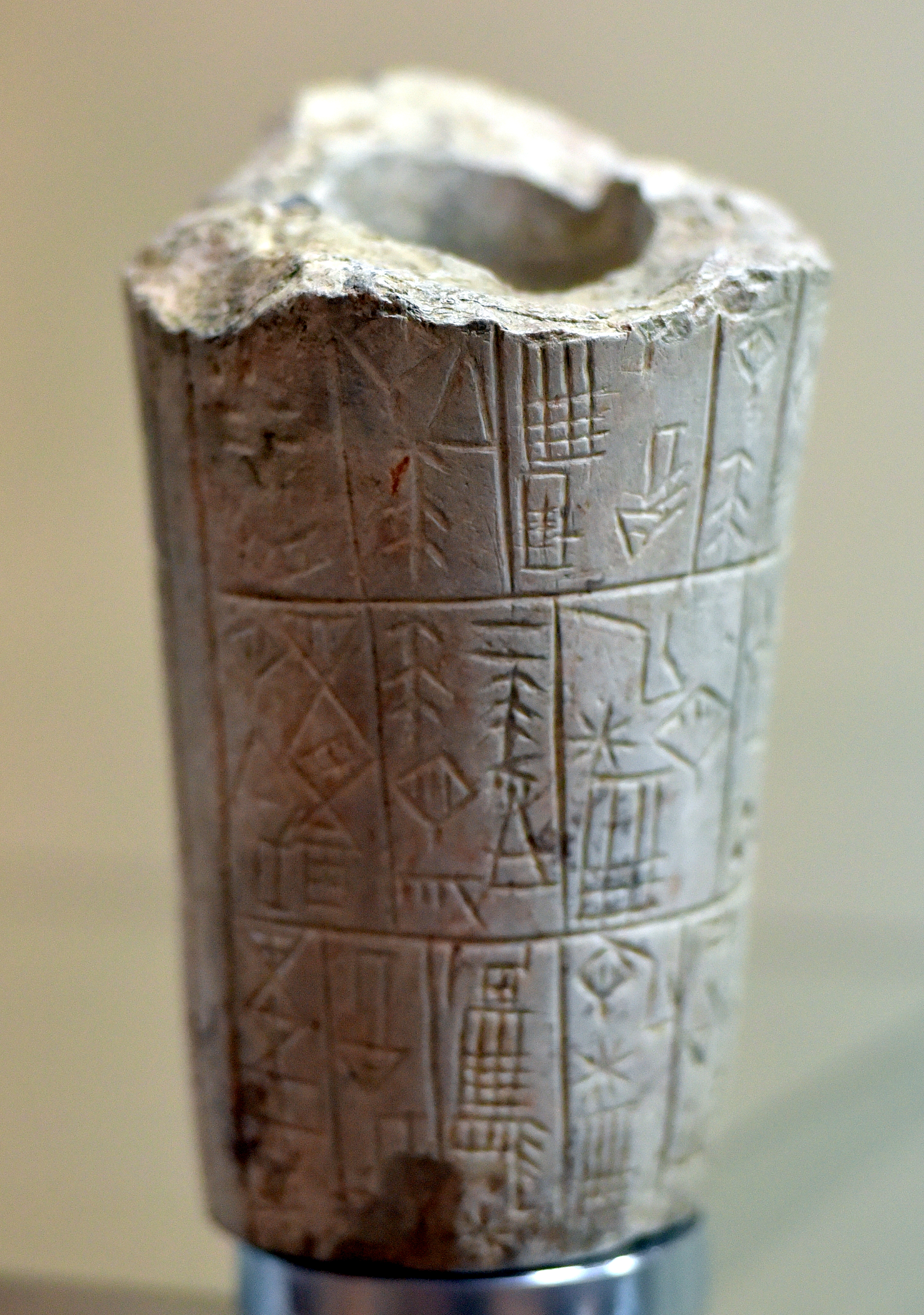
Fragment of a vessel mentioning the name of Eannatum, prince of Lagash, from Iraq, c. 2470 BCE. Iraq Museum

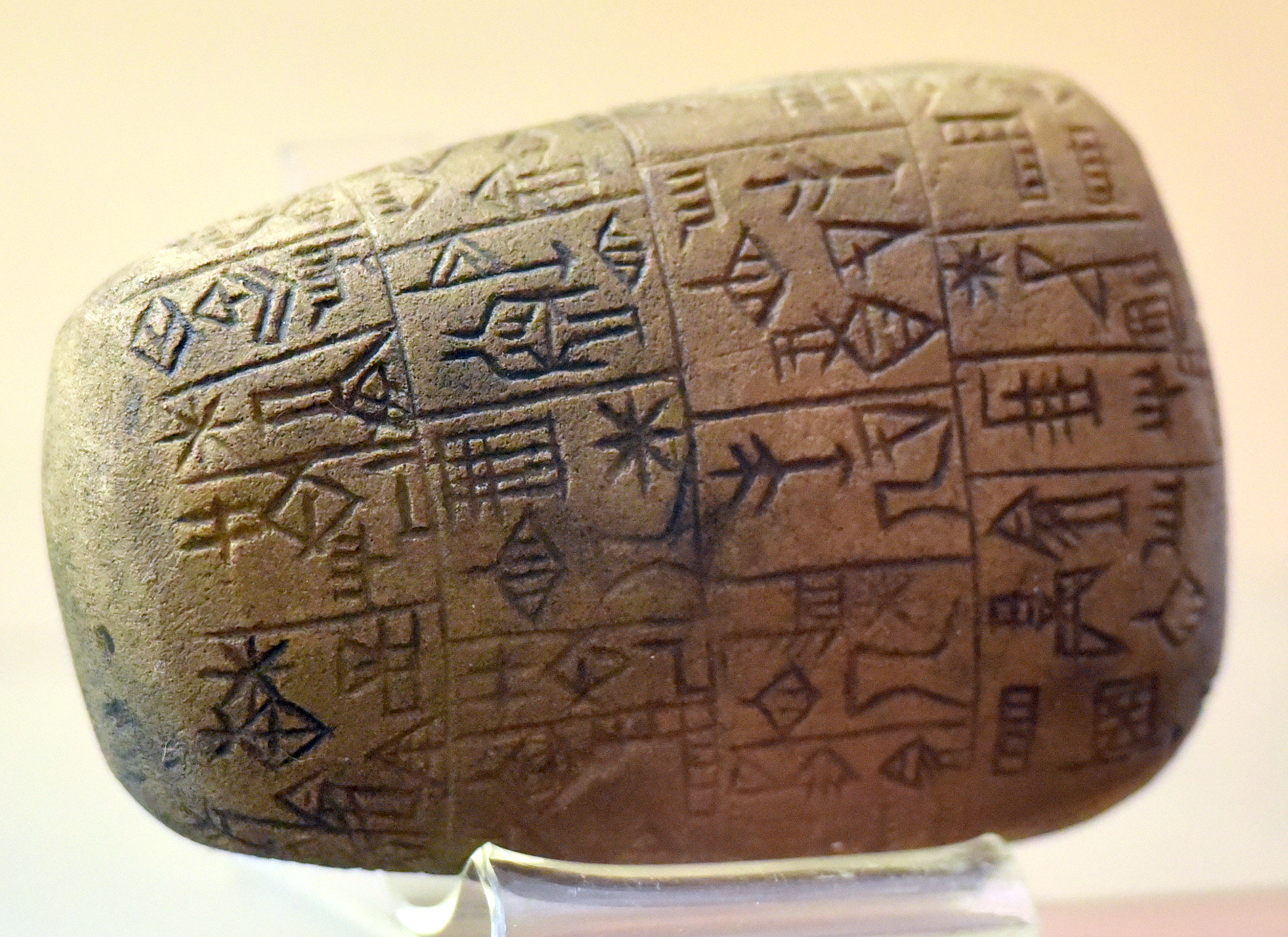
Stone pebble mentioning the name of Eannatum, prince of Lagash, from Iraq, c. 2470 BCE, Iraq Museum

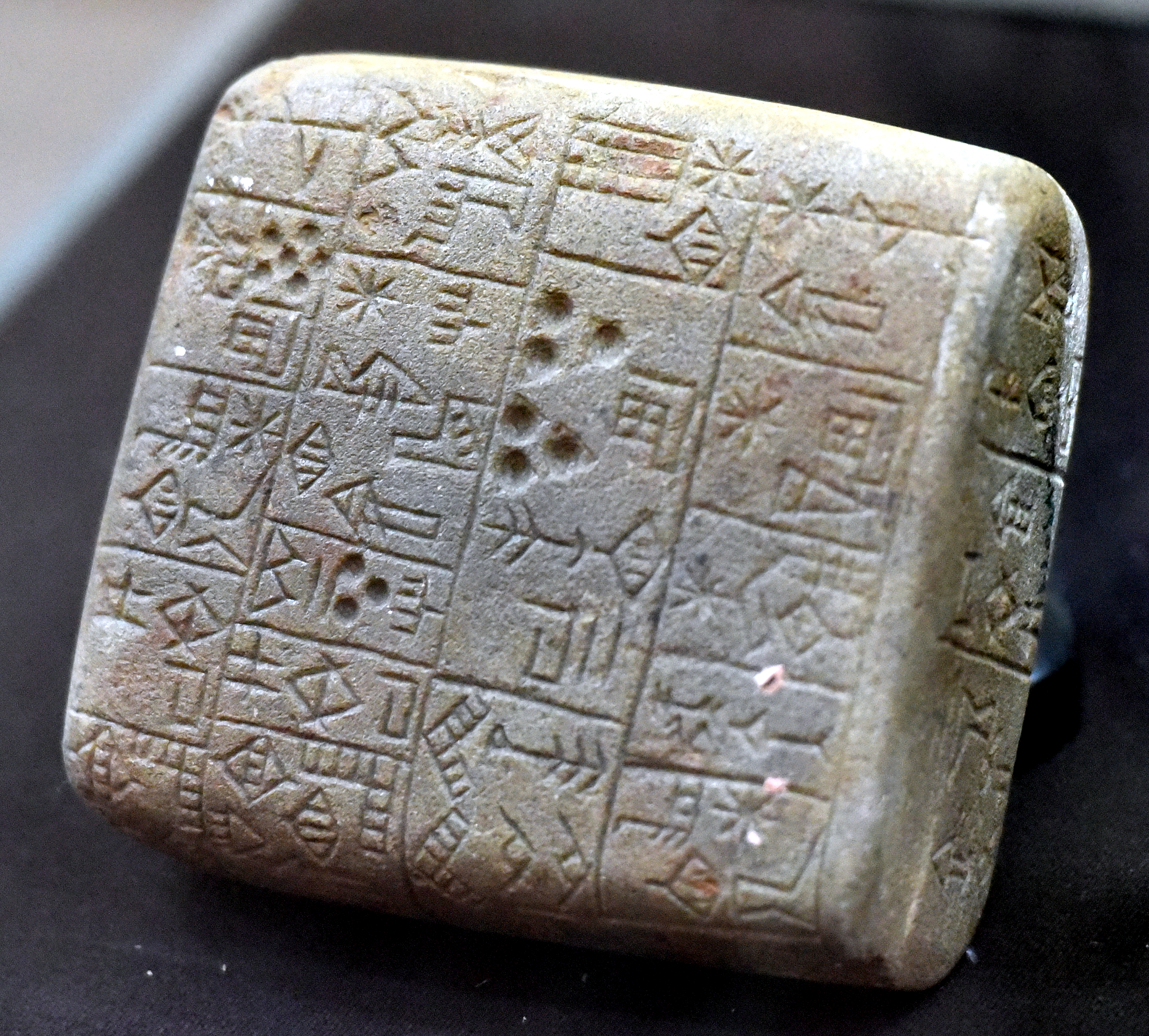
Stone plaque or tablet mentioning the name of Eannatum, prince of Lagash, from Iraq, c. 2470 BCE. Iraq Museum

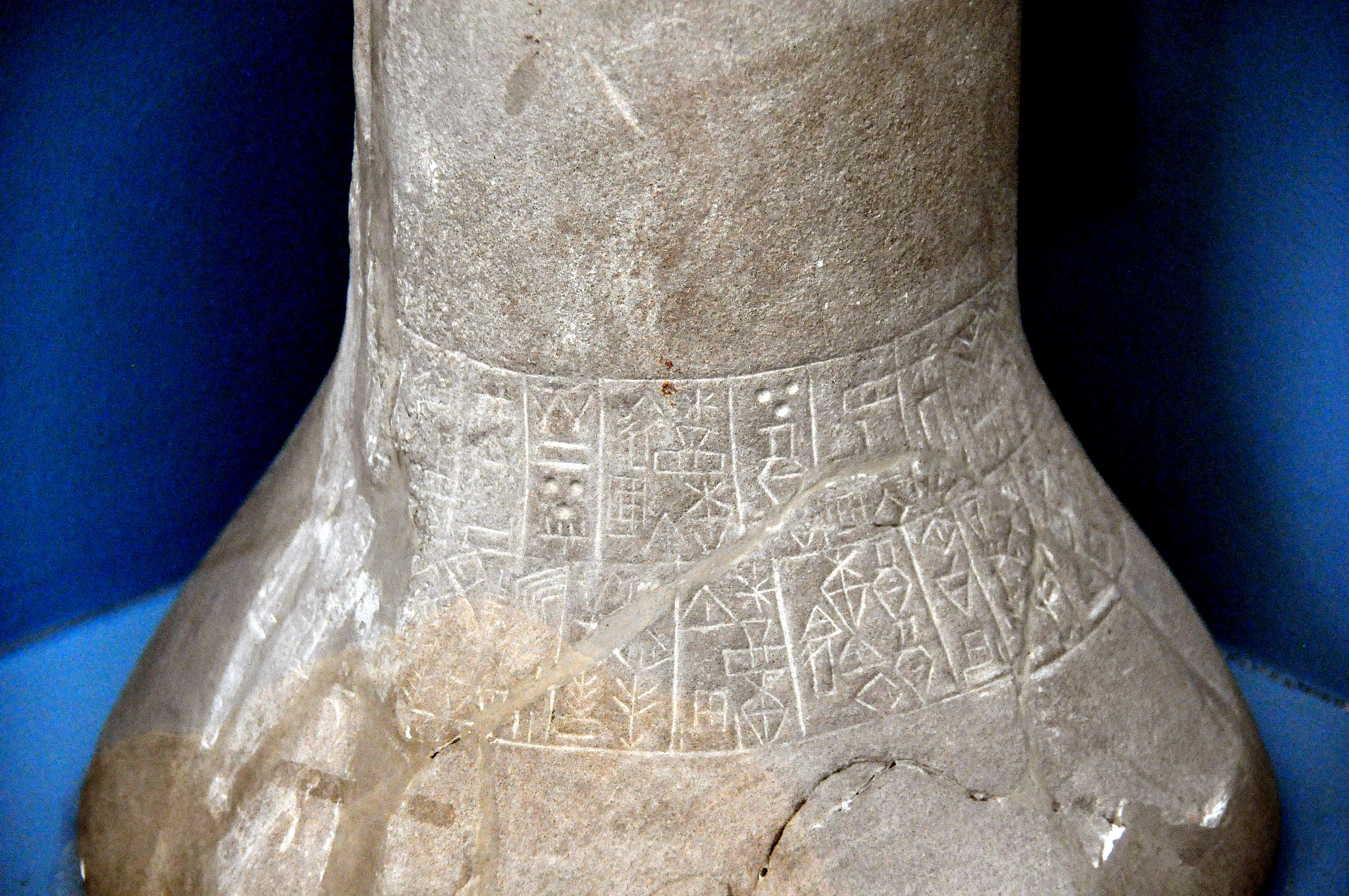
Detail. Cuneiform inscription on a limestone object from Girsu, Iraq, mentioning the name of Eannatum, Ancient Orient Museum, Istanbul

Regnal titles
Preceded by Possibly Akurgal	King of Lagash c. 2450 BC	Succeeded by Enannatum I
