= Enshakushanna =

King of Uruk c. 2350 BC

Enshakushanna 𒂗𒊮𒊨𒀭𒈾
- King of Sumer; King of all the Land
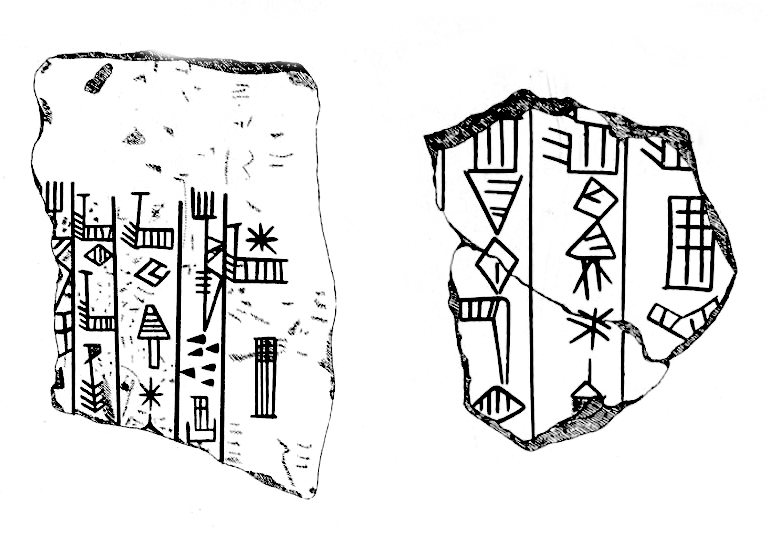
- Fragments in the name of "King Enshakushanna" (𒈗 (...) 𒂗𒊮𒊨𒀭𒈾)

King of Uruk
- Reign: c. 2350 BC
- Predecessor: Possibly Lugal-kisalsi
- Successor: Possibly Girimesi
- Dynasty: Second Dynasty of Uruk

Location of Uruk

Enshakushanna (Sumerian: 𒂗𒊮𒊨𒀭𒈾, en-sha3-kush2-an-na; fl. c. 2350 BC), or Enshagsagana, En-shag-kush-ana, Enukduanna, En-Shakansha-Ana, En-šakušuana was a king of Uruk around the mid-3rd millennium BC who is named on the Sumerian King List, which states his reign to have been 60 years. He conquered Hamazi, Akkad, Kish, and Nippur, claiming hegemony over all of Sumer.

== Titulature ==
He adopted the Sumerian title en ki-en-gi lugal kalam . (𒂗 𒆠𒂗𒄀 𒈗 𒌦),which may be translated as "lord of Sumer and king of all the land" (which possibly implies "en of the region of Uruk and lugal of the region of Ur"), and could correspond to the later title lugal ki-en-gi ki-uri "King of Sumer and Akkad" that eventually came to signify kingship over Mesopotamia as a whole.

== Reign ==
Enshakushanna's reign is largely characterized by his military campaigns, the most prominent of which was against Kish and Akshak. His attack on these two cities is attested from a stone bowl at Nippur and reads as follows:

For Enlil, king of all lands,

Enshakushanna, lord of the land of Sumer and king of the nation when the gods commanded him, he sacked Kish (and) captured Enbi-Ishtar, the king of Kish. The leader of Kish and the leader of Akshak, (when) both their cities were destroyed ... (Lacuna) in (?) [..] he returned to them,

but [he] dedicated their statues, their precious metals and lapis lazuli, their timber and treasure, to the god Enlil at [N]ippur.

An inscription on three bowl fragments found at Nippur read:

"For [the god E]nlil, En-šakuš-Ana, dedicated the treasure of sacked Kiš"

Many scholars have attributed the EDIIIb destruction layers at the Palace A and Plano-Convex Building in Kish to Enshakushanna. Federico Zaina notes the archaeological evidence at Kish attests to a "pervasive violent destruction of the city of Kish at the end of the ED IIIb". Apart from his attacks to the North, Enshakushanna is also known to have attacked Akkad. A year name of En-šakušuana, king of Uruk was "Year in which En-šakušuana defeated Akkad". This would have been shortly before the rise of the Akkadian Empire.

== Succession ==
He may have been succeeded in Uruk by Girimesi, but the hegemony seems to have passed to Eannatum of Lagash for a time. Lugal-kinishe-dudu was later allied with Entemena, a successor of Eannatum, against Lagash's principal rival, Umma.

== Inscriptions ==
Several inscriptions of Enshakushanna are known. A dedication tablet in his name is known, now in the State Hermitage Museum, St. Petersburg, Russian Federation:

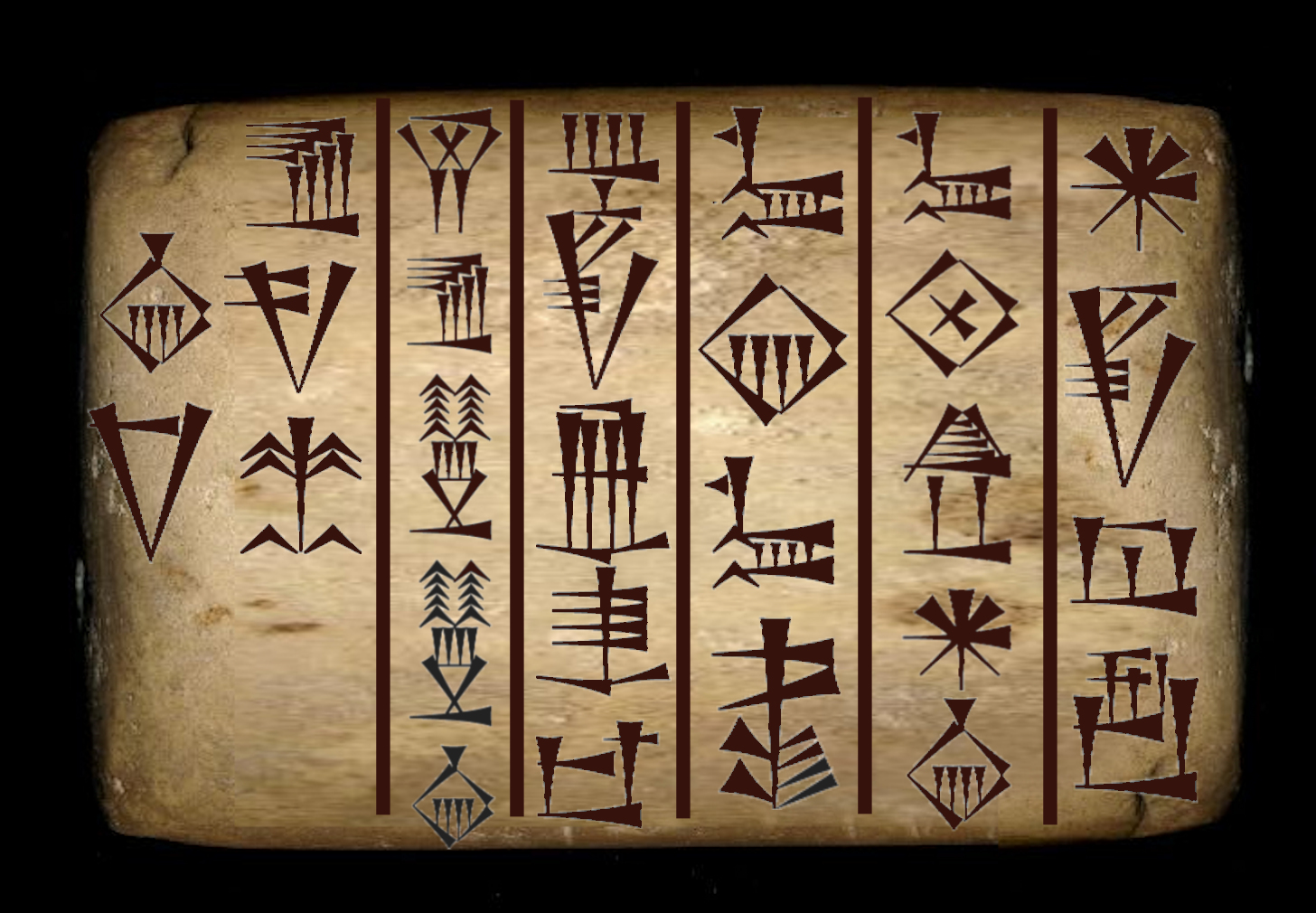
Dedication tablet by King Enshakushanna, State Hermitage Museum, St. Petersburg, Erm 14375 (reconstitution)

𒀭𒇽𒆪𒊏 / 𒂗𒊮𒊨𒀭𒈾 /𒂗 𒆠𒂗𒄀 / 𒈗 𒌦𒈣 / 𒌉𒂍𒇷𒇷𒈾 / 𒂍𒉌𒈬𒈾𒆕
^{D}LU2-KU-ra / en-sha3-kush2-an-na / en ki-en-gi / lugal kalam-ma / dumu e2-li-li-na#? / e2-ni mu-na-du3

"For ... (unknown god): Enshakushanna, lord of Sumer and king of all the land, son of Elilina, built the temple for Him."

— Dedication tablet by King Enshakushanna, State Hermitage Museum, St. Petersburg, Erm 14375.

The inscription states his father was "Elilina", possibly King Elulu of Ur.

Regnal titles
Preceded by Possibly Lugal-kisalsi	King of Uruk c. 2350 BC	Succeeded by Possibly Girimesi
