= Nin-kalla =

Wife or concubine of Shulgi, second king of the Third Dynasty of Ur

Nin-kalla (fl. c. 2050 BC) was the wife or concubine of Shulgi, second king of the Third Dynasty of Ur. Her name is Sumerian and means precious sister. The name was very common making it often difficult to identify the queen in the ancient sources as there were also other high status women with that name. Nin-kalla is mainly known from economic texts showing that she was in charge of land and its staff. Other tasks and life events are less well known. Nin-kalla was most likely living in Nippur, while she traveled for religious festivals to Ur and Uruk too. From different texts it seems clear that she was running the palace at Nippur in the latter years of Shulgi's reign. This included the kitchen, but she was also in charge of female performers. Other sources indicate that she managed further substantial resources such as cattle and land. Nin-kalla survived King Shulgi and retired to Nippur where she was still in charge on estates, some of them heavily involved in wool production.

== Literature ==
- Sharlach, Tonia M. (2017). An Ox of One's Own, Royal Wives and Religion at the Court of the Third Dynasty of Ur. Berlin/Boston: Walter de Gruyter GmbH. ISBN 978-1-5015-1447-0.
