= Naram-Sin of Akkad =

Ruler of the Akkadian Empire (c. 2254–2218 BC)

Naram-Sin 𒀭𒈾𒊏𒄠𒀭𒂗𒍪
- God of Akkad; King of Sumer; King of the Four Corners of the World; King of the Universe
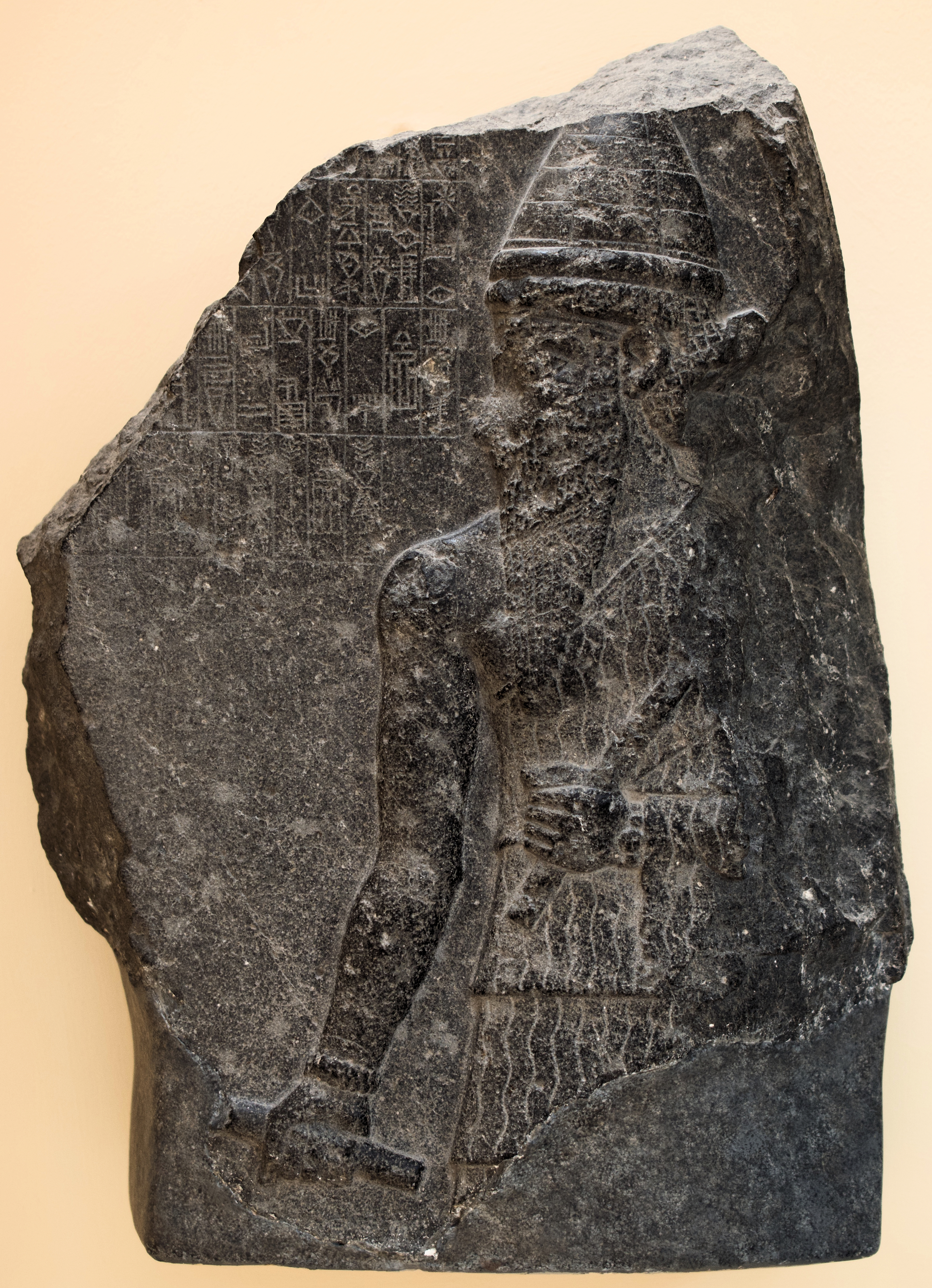
- Portrait of Naram-Sin

King of Akkad
- Reign: c. 2255 – c. 2218 BC
- Predecessor: Manishtushu
- Successor: Shar-Kali-Sharri
- Died: c. 2218 BC
- Issue: Shar-Kali-Sharri; Bin-kali-sharri; Lipit-ili; Nabi-Ulmash; Ukkin-Ulmash; Enmenanna; Simat-Ulmash; Shumshani; Tutar-napshum or Tuṭṭanabšum
- Dynasty: Dynasty of Akkad
- Father: Manishtushu

Naram-Sin, also transcribed Narām-Sîn or Naram-Suen (Akkadian: 𒀭𒈾𒊏𒄠𒀭𒂗𒍪: ^{D}Na-ra-am ^{D}Sîn, meaning "Beloved of (the Moon God) Sîn"), was a ruler of the Akkad, who reigned c. 2255–2218 BC or from 2253 to 2198 BC (middle chronology), and was the third successor and grandson of King Sargon of Akkad.

He inherited a kingdom that controlled all of Lower Mesopotamia and had no rival of its size in the neighboring regions. But it was still weakly structured, particularly with regard to control over the regions beyond the Mesopotamian plain. The internal chronology of his reign has not been established, but the most significant event was a 'Great Revolt' that mobilized most of the major cities of Lower Mesopotamia, which had still been independent just a few decades earlier and sought to overthrow Akkadian rule. Naram-Sin succeeded in defeating the insurgents after several battles.

It was probably after this event that he decided to consolidate the state he ruled and give it a truly 'imperial' character. This involved, on the one hand, an ideological shift that conferred divine status upon him: he became the “God of Akkad,” the capital, and was worshipped as such. He commissioned numerous inscriptions in his honor, which appear on monuments depicting his exploits, such as the Victory Stele. Naram-Sin also undertook a series of administrative reforms, and governed with the help of a ruling elite loyal to him, to whom he granted titles and estates.

Regarding relations with neighboring regions, Naram-Sin was a conqueror in the tradition of his predecessors, leading campaigns in the Zagros, in the Persian Gulf as far as Magan (present-day Oman), and in Upper Mesopotamia and Syria, where he advanced even further than his predecessors, reaching the sources of the Tigris and the Euphrates in southeastern Anatolia. He consolidated Akkadian hegemony in these regions and his control over the main trade routes by establishing a network of garrisons at strategic points. Images glorifying the king were disseminated to the margins of the empire to proclaim his dominion over these regions.

Since ancient times, Naram-Sin has been viewed as a larger-than-life figure, just like his grandfather Sargon. His memory remains very much alive in later generations of Mesopotamian history. This is particularly evident in the composition of several literary works in which he is the protagonist, serving to convey reflections on kingship and the relationship between the gods and kings, such as the Curse of Akkad. This paints an ambivalent picture of Naram-Sin: while he is consistently portrayed as a powerful and conquering king, he is also repeatedly depicted as an outrageously proud figure whose excesses led to the downfall of Akkad.

== Sources ==
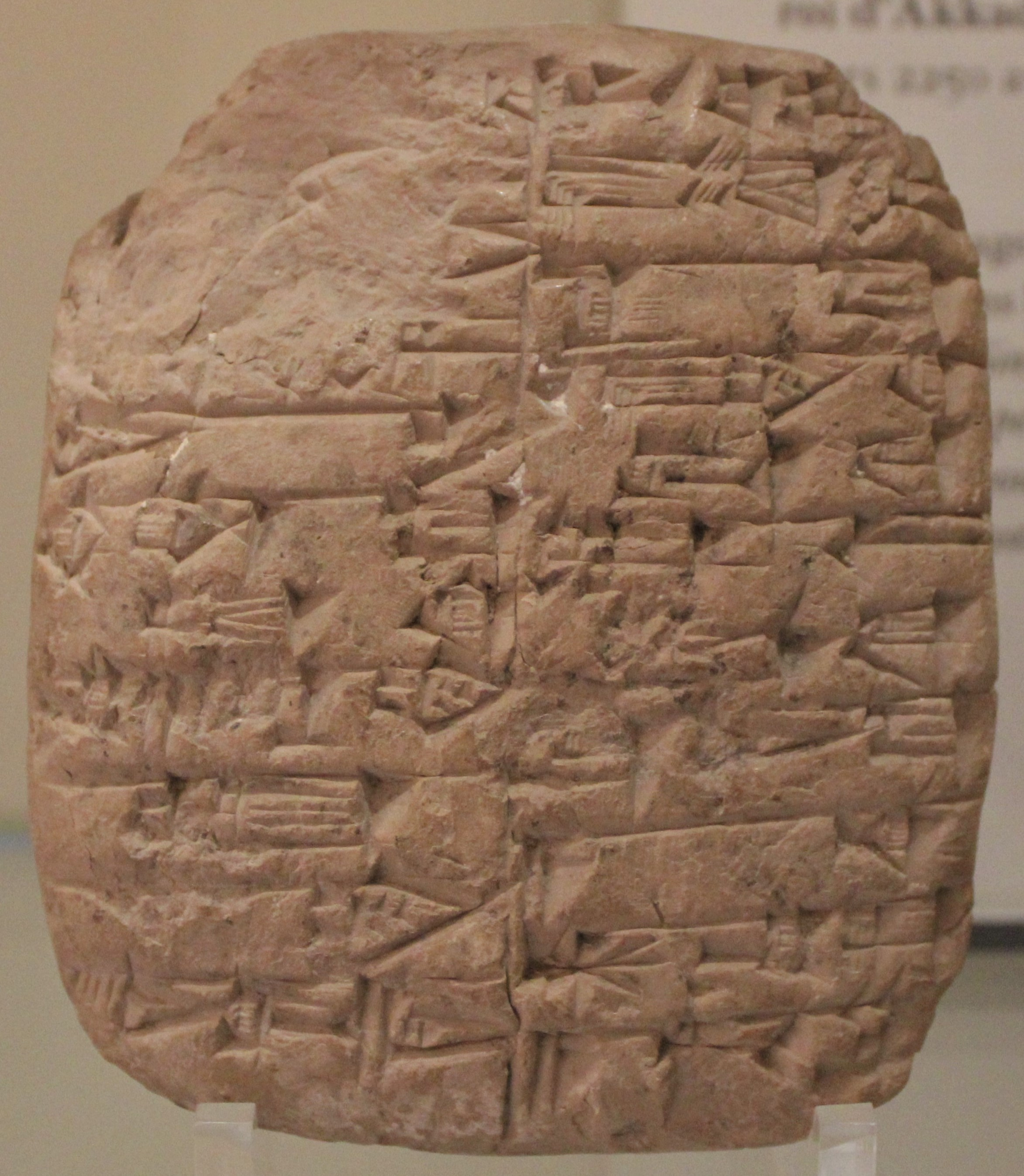
An Old Babylonian copy of an inscription by Naram-Sin on a statue of himself, displayed in the temple of Enlil at Nippur. Louvre Museum. Translation (gaps filled in by another copy of the inscription): "[Naram]-Sin, king of the four [quarters of the earth], when he defeated HAR-shamat and he himself slew a wild bull at Mount Tibar, he made animage of it (or: himself) and dedicated it to Enlil, his father. Whoever shall make away with this inscription, may Enlil and Shamash tear out his foundation and take away his seed."

=== Commemorative texts ===
The reign of Naram-Sin is documented by inscriptions commemorating the events of his reign deemed the most remarkable, while glorifying the king himself. These inscriptions vary in length. Most have since been lost, but they were copied several centuries after Naram-Sin’s death by scribes who had access to them while they were on display in sanctuaries, above all that of Enlil in Nippur. They provide information on Naram-Sin’s military conquests but do not offer detailed descriptions of the events. The copy tablets also include information on the aspect of the monuments on which the texts were inscribed (type of object, location of the inscriptions, images).

Among the texts commemorating the king’s achievements are also the year names: following a practice that became widespread during this period to distinguish between years, a year was given a name in reference to a major event that had occurred the previous year. They were used to date administrative texts, and this is how historians generally identify them. For a reign credited with no more than 56 years, about twenty year names are known, and it is unclear in what order to arrange them. They commemorate military victories (“The year Naram-Sin defeated Maridaban,” “The year Naram-Sin was victorious over Simurrum at Kirasheniwe and captured Baba, governor of Simurrum, (and) Dubul, governor of Arame”), including distant expeditions (“The year Naram-Sin reached the sources of the Tigris and Euphrates rivers, and was victorious in battle over Shenaminda”), pious acts (“The year Naram-Sin laid the foundations of the temple of the god Enlil in Nippur and the temple of the goddess Ishtar in Zabala”), and secular constructions (“The year the wall of Akkad was built”).

=== Administrative texts ===
Naram-Sin’s reign is characterized by a sharp increase in administrative documentation: most of the known documents of this type dating from the Akkadian period (approximately 8,000 in total) were written during his reign or that of his son Shar-kali-sharri. These are valuable sources for understanding the internal organization of the Akkadian Empire.

=== Pseudo-historical texts ===
Written sources composed after Naram-Sin’s reign attest to the existence of a legendary tradition surrounding him. They primarily provide information about the period in which they were written, especially regarding the ideology of kingship. As for their usefulness in reconstructing the history of the Akkadian Empire, this remains a matter of debate. Historians have frequently tended to rely too heavily on them when studying the reigns of Akkadian kings, or even to adopt—without the necessary historical perspective—the 'heroic' and 'imperial' side of the period that they convey. It is now recognized that it is difficult, though not necessarily impossible, to use them to reconstruct the reign of Naram-Sin: they are clearly grounded in truth, since some of these texts are based on commemorative inscriptions, but they also contain a large proportion of fictional events invented centuries after his death.

=== Arts and archaeology ===
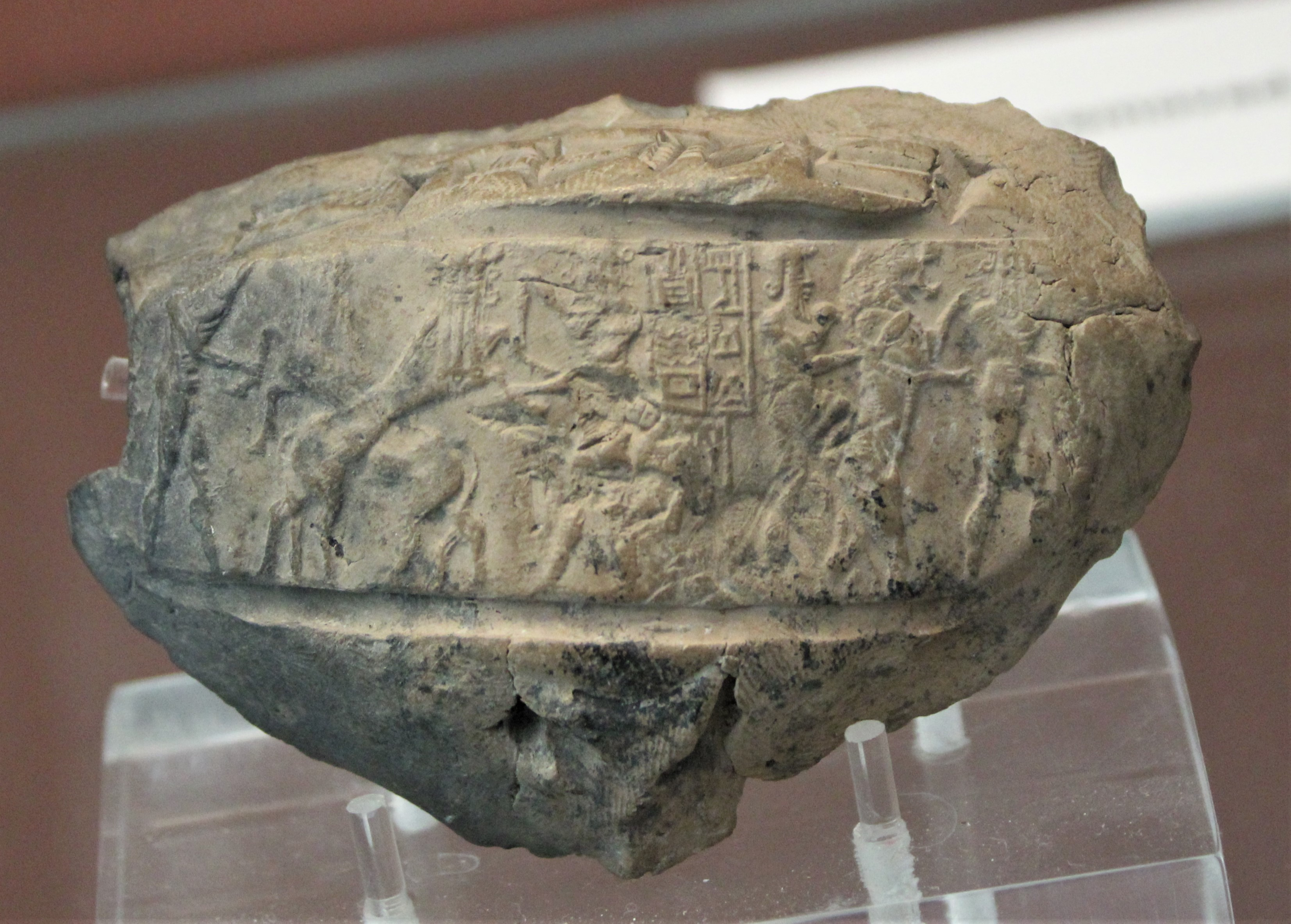
A clay impression of the cylinder seal of a scribe from the Akkadian administration, depicting a battle scene characteristic of the reigns of Naram-Sin and Shar-kali-sharri. Tello (Girsu). British Museum.

Written sources are supplemented by non-written sources. Archaeological excavations have uncovered buildings dating to the time of Naram-Sin, or at least to the final reigns of the Akkadian Empire (Tell Asmar, Tell Brak, Tell Leilan).

The study of images is crucial to understanding Naram-Sin’s reign. These consist primarily of a small number of sculpted monuments—statues and stelae—which also bear inscriptions conveying Akkadian royal ideology; the most famous of these is the Victory Stele of Naram-Sin. The analysis of the images (and inscriptions) on the cylinder seals of members of the Akkadian elite, known from the discovery of some of these objects and from the presence of their impressions on clay tablets or bullae, also deepens our understanding of the period.

== Reign ==
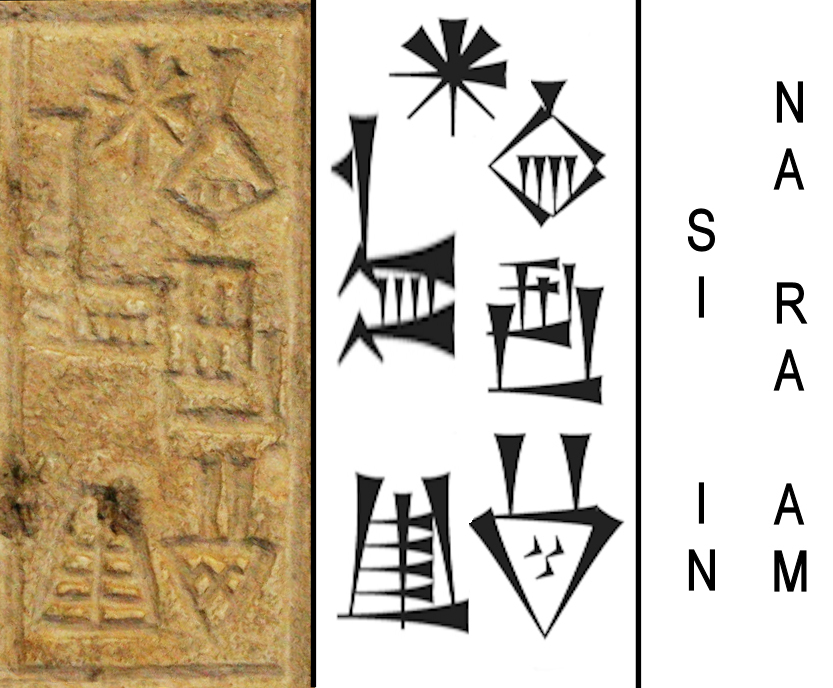
The name "Naram-Sin" in cuneiform on an inscription. The star symbol "𒀭" is a silent honorific for "Divine", Sîn (Moon God) is specially written with the characters "EN-ZU" (𒂗𒍪).

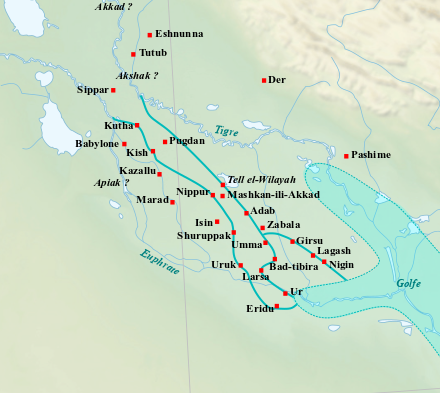
Location of the main sites in southern Mesopotamia during the Akkadian period.

=== Chronology ===
As is typical for this distant period, the sequence of events that took place during Naram-Sin’s reign cannot be reconstructed with precision:

- the exact duration of his reign is unknown: the Sumerian King List credits him with a 56-year reign (though 54 years and 6 months in the oldest version of the chronicle), which is the same number of years it assigns to Sargon’s reign. This has been questioned by Thorkild Jacobsen, and following his lead, it is common to propose a reign of at least 37 years, although some scholars still maintain a reign of about fifty years.
- It is unknown exactly when his reign took place—including both the date of his accession and the date of his death—due to ongoing debates regarding the chronology of the 3rd millennium BC in Mesopotamia, which mean that historians are only able to propose approximate dates. His reign is generally placed around the second half of the 23st century BC. Among the various proposals, which also depend on the proposed length of his reign: 2255-2218 BC, 2253–2198 BC, or 2261–2206 BC,
- It is unknown in what order the events mentioned in the king’s inscriptions (the Great Revolt, military campaigns abroad, deification), and therefore, a fortiori, when they occurred, even within his reign. D. Frayne has proposed a sequence of events based on the assumption that his deification occurred at a specific point in his reign, and that from that point on, all his official inscriptions write his name with the cuneiform sign indicating divinity, which means that those in which it is absent predate that point. According to him, the first part of the reign was marked by several military campaigns in neighboring countries, prior to the general insurrection that marked a turning point, as it was followed by the construction of several temples and pious works, as well as the deification of the king; the remainder of his reign was marked by conquests in Upper Mesopotamia and Syria, as well as on the Iranian Plateau. This attempt has been criticized, particularly because the method of dating events based on the absence or presence of the divine sign does not seem that reliable.

=== The accession to the throne and its background ===
According to the Sumerian King List, Naram-Sin was the son of King Manishtushu, himself the son of Sargon of Akkad, the founder of the dynasty, and the successor to Rimush, another son of Sargon. While there is no doubt that these kings belonged to the same dynasty, historians are divided regarding their order of succession, as it is possible that Manishtushu reigned before Rimush. Naram-Sin provides no indication of his father’s identity in his inscriptions, which was a common practice among Akkadian kings, who did not seem to feel the need to highlight their ancestors in order to establish their legitimacy.

When he ascended the throne, Naram-Sin inherited a vast state, often described as an 'empire' and certainly a political entity unprecedented in Mesopotamian history in terms of scale and ambitions. Sargon founded it around 2300 BCE, starting from his city of Akkad, by subjugating and annexing all the kingdoms that had divided Lower Mesopotamia among themselves. He then undertook campaigns into neighboring regions (Syria, western Iran) that left a strong impression due to the distances they covered, but which apparently did not result in direct domination. His two sons, Rimush and Manishtushu, continued his work and consolidated the kingdom. The former faced a revolt in the south, which he suppressed, and carried out military campaigns abroad. The latter also undertook military campaigns beyond Lower Mesopotamia.

Information about Naram-Sin prior to his reign comes solely from sources of questionable historical reliability. A fragment of a later poem seems to indicate that he had already led a campaign while he was still crown prince. According to a 'historical' oracle from the early 2nd millennium BC, Manishtushu is said to have been assassinated, though this, too, cannot be confirmed.

The name of the first year of Naram-Sin’s reign is known, and it indicates that the king was 'crowned' in the temple of the great god Enlil at Nippur: "The year Naram-Sin received a weapon of the god An (or Heaven) from the temple of the god Enlil."

=== The Great Revolt ===
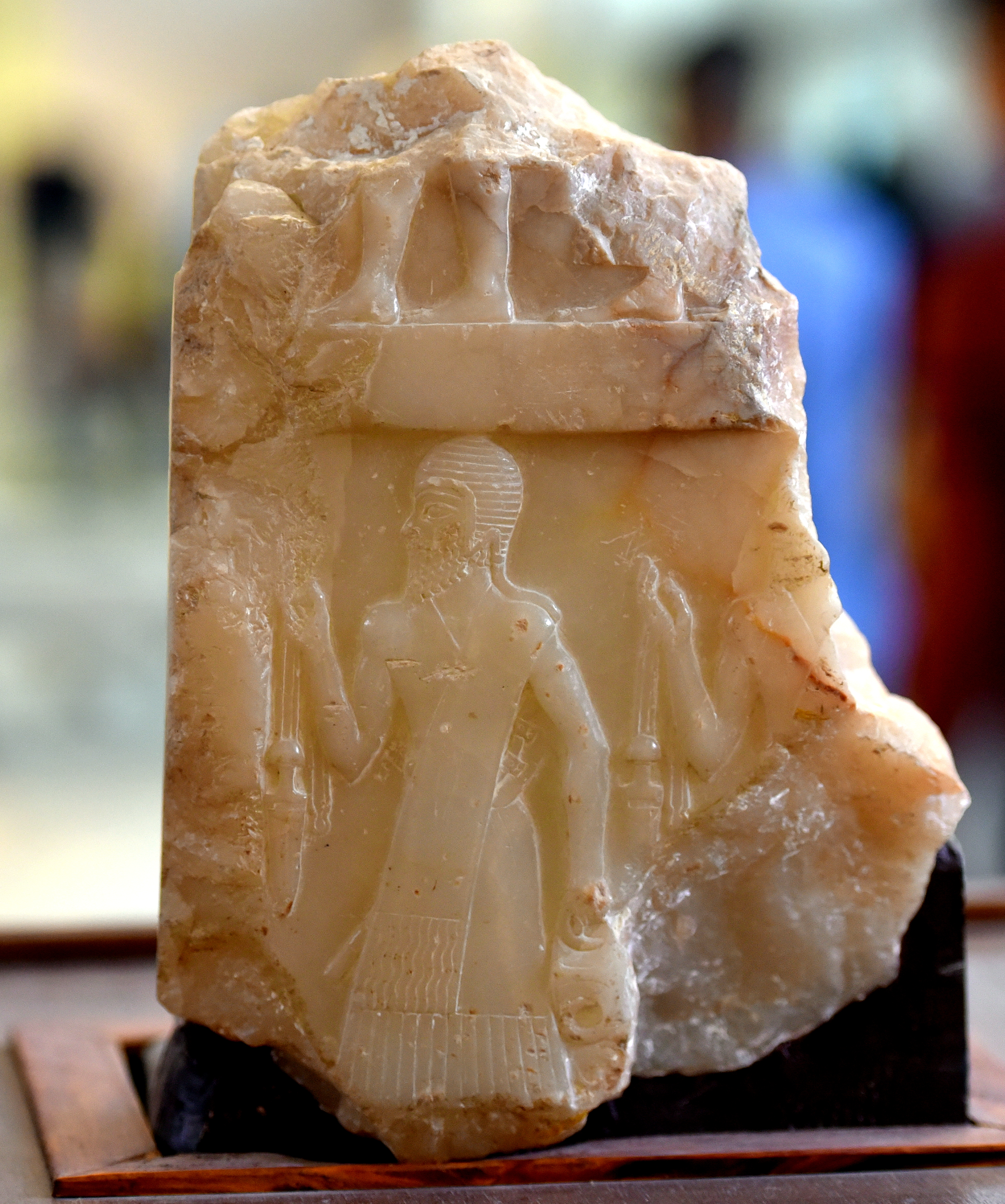
Akkadian victory stele (from the reign of Naram-Sin?) depicting Akkadian soldiers. Nasiriyah region. Iraqi National Museum.

The pivotal event of Naram-Sin's reign was a widespread revolt against the Akkadian Empire, a large coalition of city-states led in the north by Iphur-Kis of Kish (Sumer) and in the south by Amar-Girid of Uruk, joined by Enlil-nizu of Nippur, and including the city-states of "Kutha, TiWA, Sippar, Kazallu, Kiritab, [Api]ak and GN" as well as "Amorite [hi]ghlanders". The rebellion was joined by the city of Borsippa, among others.

It is unclear at what point in his reign it occurred: probably not at the beginning, perhaps after about twenty years of reign (around 2230 according to Schrakamp, who dates the start of his reign to 2253), or even thirty years (according to Steinkeller, who estimates a reign of 55 years), or in the final years of his reign (according to a proposal cautiously put forward by Westenholz).

We know of these events from a number of Old Babylonian copies of earlier inscriptions as well as one contemporary record from the Old Akkadian period the Bassetki Statue. According to the king’s account, the uprising lasted one year and necessited nine battles to be quelled. Kish and Uruk were subjected to an exemplary punishment. The cities in the Gulf region that had joined the insurgents likewise suffered the vengeance of Naram-Sin.

By the verdict of the goddess Annunitum and the god Anum, Naram-Sin, the mighty, was victorious over the Kishite in battle at the Kish. In addition, Puzur-Numushda, governor of Kazallu; Dannum, captain of Borsippa; Pupalim, captain of Apiak, Iddi(n)-[Ilum], governor of Kutha; Ilishtakal, governor of Sippar; Shalim-beli, governor of Kiritab; Qishum, governor of Eresh; Ita-Ilum, governor of Dilbat; and Imtalik captain of TiWA — in total 1,000 officers and 2,015 captives — he captured in battle. Further, he filled the Euphrates River with their (bodies), conquered the city of Kish, and destroyed its wall. Further, he made the river/canal go forth in its (the city's) midst and struck down 2,525 men within the city.

This was the second major revolt faced by the kings of Akkad, following the one that took place during the reign of Rimush, which was also harshly suppressed. Historians believe these uprisings were motivated by a rejection of Akkadian rule, resentment against its centralizing tendencies, land grabs, and authoritarianism of the kings of Akkad. This disapproval may have been stronger among the southern populations than among those in the north, as evidenced by the fact that the southern cities resisted for longer.

Whatever it may be, these events clearly had a considerable impact. Naram-Sin believed that the entire world had risen up against him, that he had narrowly escaped disaster, and that the rebels—particularly Kish—had shown ingratitude toward Akkad, which had treated them well up to that point. This unexpected victory appears to have marked a turning point in Naram-Sin’s reign. Regardless of when it took place, it is generally believed that it was after this triumph that the king was deified, and that he implemented the major reforms aimed at consolidating the unity of the empire.

=== Foreign conquests ===
The Akkadian Empire under Naram-Sin. Control over the territories beyond Lower Mesopotamia was sporadic.

Naram-Sin followed in the footsteps of his predecessors with his military campaigns: he was a tireless conqueror, whose armies in turn swept through the lands conquered by the early kings of Akkad. But he went even further than his predecessors, bringing several regions of Upper Mesopotamia and the Iranian Plateau under his direct control. He left no detailed descriptions of his conquests, but the assertion of Akkadian control over several of the conquered lands has been confirmed by archaeological discoveries.

Beginning in Sargon’s reign, the Akkadian Empire expanded toward the lands to the east and northeast of the Mesopotamian plain, and his two successors continued in this direction. There is, however, only limited evidence of military campaigns in these regions during the reign of Naram-Sin, but these regions appear to have been firmly held by Akkadian authority, either through direct settlements or through allies. The routes leading up toward the Zagros Mountains along the tributaries of the Tigris (the Diyala River, the Adhem, and the Little Zab) generally constituted axes of expansion for the Akkadian Empire, and settlements such as Awal likely served as departure points for expeditions. These routes led to regions that were the targets of several military campaigns, namely Simurrum and Lullubum. Naram-Sin’s Victory Stele commemorates a victory over the latter. There is no clear evidence of a campaign by Naram-Sin in what is now southwestern Iran, even though he proclaims in a brief inscription that Elam is among the territories he conquered.

Naram-Sin also commemorated an overseas military campaign toward the land of Magan (or Makkan), probably located in present-day Oman. This country was normally a trading partner of Mesopotamia (as a major source of copper and diorite), not really an enemy (probably because it was located too far away), but it had previously been the target of an Akkadian campaign during the reign of Rimush. The expedition to Magan during Naram-Sin’s reign was likely motivated by that country’s support for the insurgents during the Great Revolt. Vases found in various sites bear inscriptions with Naram-Sin’s name, specifying that they were obtained during the sacking of Magan.

Naram-Sin seems to have directed his expansionist ambitions primarily toward Upper Mesopotamia, and even further afield. Year names and inscriptions briefly commemorate conquests of kingdoms located even further to the north and east, in regions designated as the “North,” Subartum, and the “Upper Country” (in northern Syria), which cannot always be precisely located: Talmush, Simanum, Azuhinnum, Talhatum. One inscription also mentions that the king personally hunted a wild bull on Mount Tibar, which may correspond to Jebel Abdulaziz. Naram-Sin also claims to have retraced the steps of his grandfather Sargon in the Cedar Forest, which is thought to be located in the Amanus. A long inscription commemorates this event, as well as the conquests of Armanum (Tell Bazi?) and Ebla (Tell Mardikh) in western Syria, within the domain of the great god Dagan (who plays the same role for the Syrian cities as Enlil does for those of Sumer), again echoing Sargon’s inscriptions.

Whereas, for all time since the creation of mankind, no king whosoever had destroyed Armanum and Ebla, the god Nergal, by means of (his) weapons opened the way for Naram-Sin, the mighty, and gave him Armanum and Ebla. Further, he gave to him the Amanus, the Cedar Mountain, and the Upper Sea. By means of the weapons of the god Dagan, who magnifies his kingship, Naram-Sin, the mighty, conquered Armanum and Ebla.

The destruction of Mari, which occurred around the same time, is generally attributed to the period of Sargon’s conquests. But, according to another hypothesis, it may have taken place during the reign of Naram-Sin (following an initial conquest without destruction under Sargon), during the suppression of the Great Revolt, which this city is said to have supported.

== Expressions of power ==
=== Deification ===
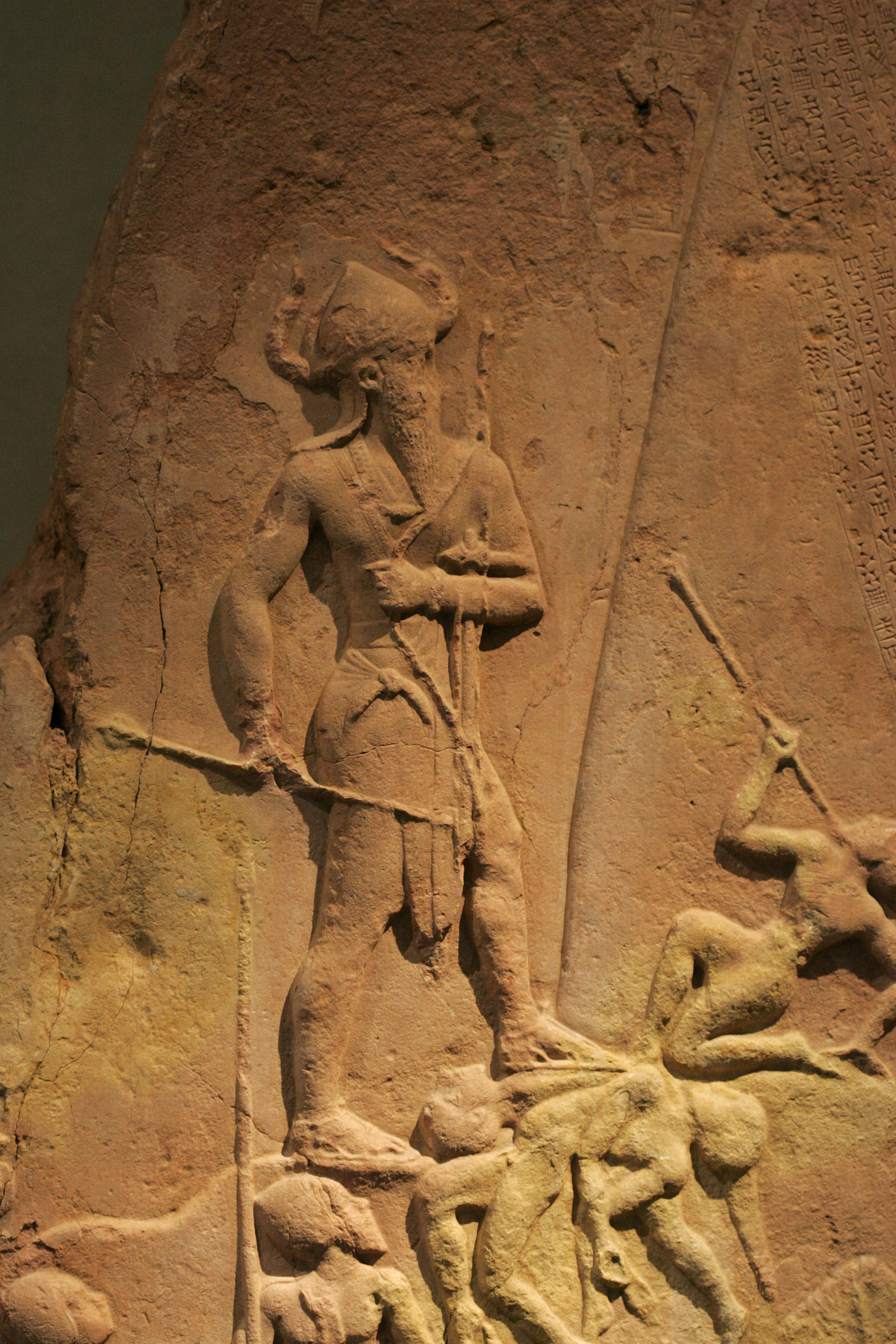
Detail of the victory stele: King Naram-Sin wearing the horned tiara, symbolizing divinity. Louvre Museum.

With Naram-Sin, the king’s status took on a new dimension, as he assumed divine stature. According to Naram-Sin’s official account, as recorded in the inscription on the Bassetki Statue, this occurred at the express request of the citizens of Akkad, who proclaimed his divine status in recognition of his having saved them from destruction. They appealed to the great gods (or to the king himself) to have Naram-Sin elevated to the status of “god of Akkad,” and once approval was granted, they erected a temple for him. This would mean that he then played the role of a protective deity of the capital and its people,, or even that of a tutelary deity.

On account of the fact that he had protected/strengthened the foundations of their city in difficult straits, (the people of) his city requested from Inana in Eana, from Enlil in Nippur, from Dagan in Tuttul, from Ninhursag in Keš, from Enki in Eridu, from Suen in Ur, from Šamaš in Sippar, (and) from Nergal in Kutha, that he be (made) god of their city, and (accordingly) they erected his temple in the midst of Akkade..

The nature of this deification has been questioned, often downplayed, or even denied by some. It is essentially identified in other sources by two features, which have characterized divinity in Mesopotamian literature and art for several centuries: the king’s name appears in several cuneiform texts preceded by the (unpronounced) determinative sign in the shape of a star, 𒀭 DINGIR, which generally precedes divine names; the king is depicted in art on at least two occasions wearing the horned tiara on his head, a headdress that in Mesopotamian art is a distinctive sign of godship.

P. Steinkeller points out, however, that the establishment of a cult—and thus rituals—in his honor during his lifetime is more significant. He also emphasizes that this deification served a political purpose: “the objective of Naram-Sin’s deification was not to make people believe in it, but to create a socio-political reality in which he could lawfully be placed above everybody else, kings and commoners alike.”

=== Titles ===
Other evidence suggests that the king was leaving the world of mere mortals to draw closer to the divine realm. The fact that Naram-Sin was also the first king to take the title of “the strong/powerful/mighty one” (dannum) also points to his heroic, if not divine, qualities: the expression is attested in earlier periods only in reference to Gilgamesh, who is both an eminent king of the past and a deity, and more generally refers to the king’s physical attributes (strength, power, vigor, health, and youth), which are also depicted in official art.

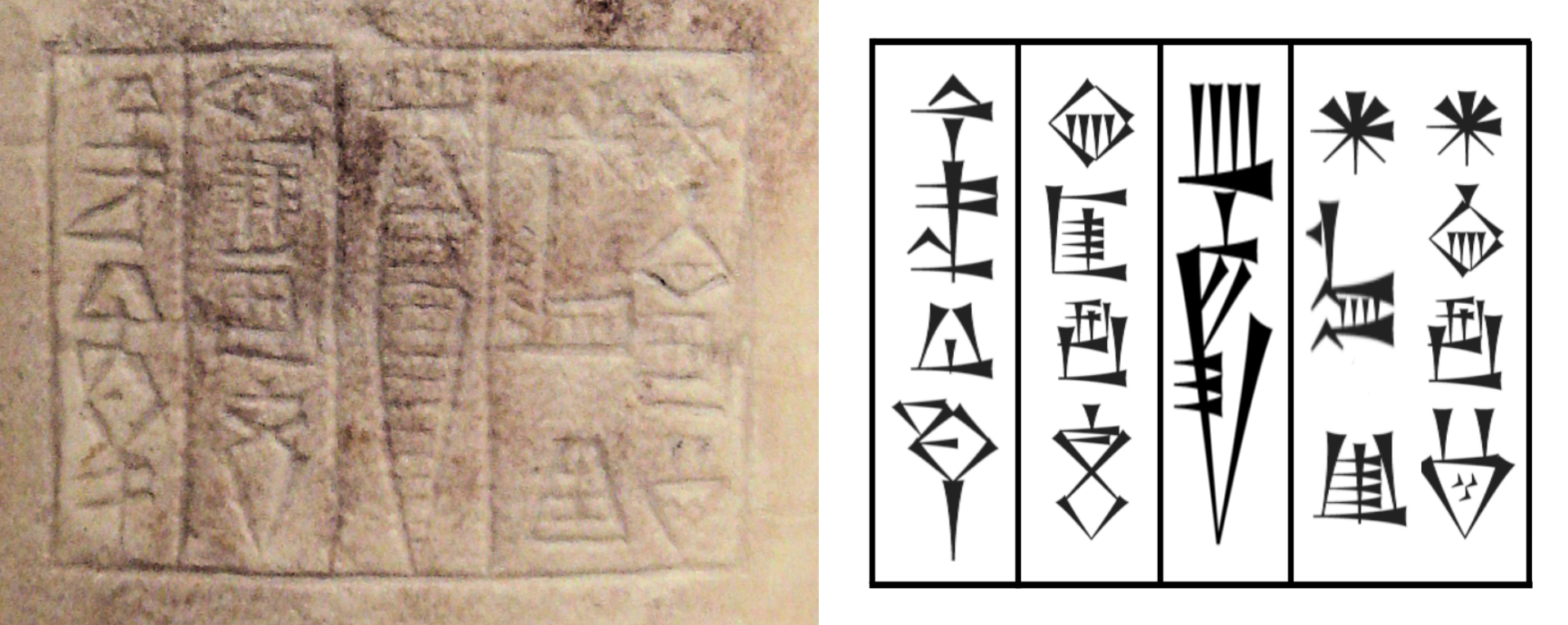
Inscription of Naram-Sin on a vase, with its standardized transcription: "(The god) Naram-Sin, king of the four corners." Louvre Museum.

Naram-Sin also sought to present himself as a conquering king, and this was accompanied by a shift in his titles: while his predecessors generally referred to themselves as “King of Kish” (which may also mean “King of the World”), he was the first to refer to himself as “King of the Four Corners (of the earth),” a reference to the four parts into which Mesopotamian mental maps divided the world—the different directions in which he led his armies. This formula, proclaiming and 'imperial' or 'universal', ambition, would later be adopted by many Mesopotamian rulers.

=== Royal art ===
The primary purpose of art from the Akkadian period was to represent the king and the power of the empire; it has been defined as 'royal art.' It is best known for two types of artworks: carved stone monuments and the cylinder seals of members of the Akkadian elite.

Most of Naram-Sin’s monuments have been lost. A late copy of an inscription by an Akkadian king, likely Naram-Sin, refers to a golden image of the king: "he fashioned an image of himself, an eternal golden statue (representing) his power and the battles in which he had been victorious." Another copy of an inscription includes a description of a stele that depicted the siege of a city. Among the known works of art from the Akkadian period, some can be attributed with certainty to the reign of Naram-Sin because they bear an inscription with his name. The most famous is the victory stele (see below). This is also the case for a basalt stele unearthed at Pir Hüseyin near Diyarbakır in southeastern Turkey, likely the site where it was displayed in antiquity, spreading the king’s glory to the far reaches of his empire. It depicts the king wearing a tunic more reminiscent of ceremonial attire than that of war, with a headdress, and holding two staffs in his hands, perhaps weapons. A broken copper statue, unearthed at Bassetki in northern Iraq, depicts the back of a naked man—likely a protective figure—seated on a pedestal that also incorporates the base of a standard. The accompanying inscription refers to the victory over the Great Revolt and the deification of the king. A broken diorite statue, unearthed at Susa, of which only the base survives, depicted the king; today, only his feet remain. The inscription refers to his campaign against the land of Magan.

The attribution of other, uninscribed artworks to the reign of Naram-Sin is debated. A fragmentary stone mold of unknown provenance depicting a king facing the goddess Ishtar is likely a representation of Naram-Sin, a king who repeatedly asserted his close relationship with this goddess, especially since he is depicted in the same manner as on the Victory Stele (see below). This object was likely used to produce metal depictions of the king, perhaps in sheet gold. Naram-Sin may also be the subject of the royal copper head, cast using the lost-wax method, found in the temple of Ishtar in Nineveh, where it had been stored since the 7th century BC, and which is considered one of the finest examples of 'classical' Akkadian art. However, it could also be Manishtushu or Shar-kali-sharri. It was originally part of a composite statue depicting the ruler in full figure.

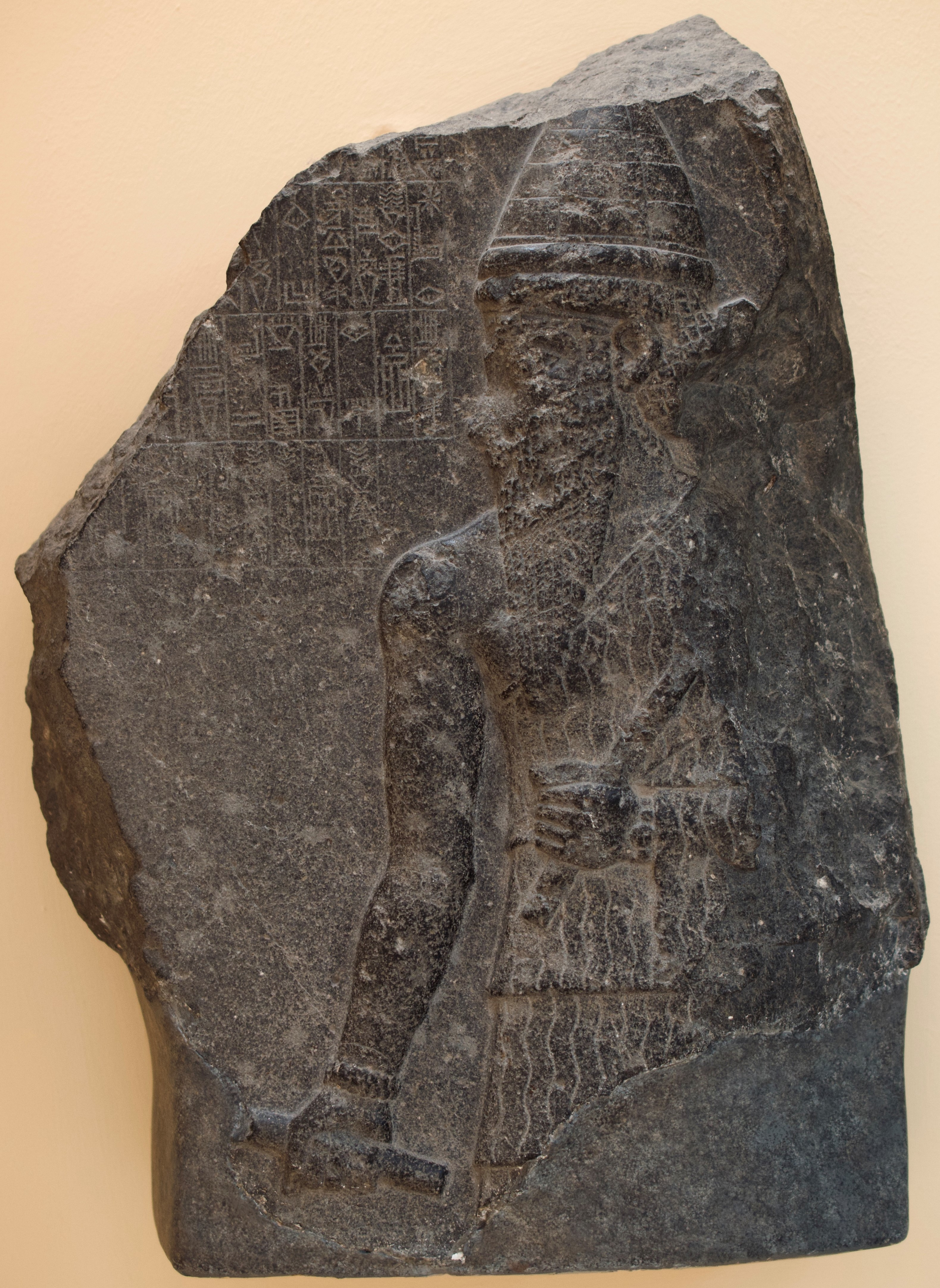
Fragment of a basalt stele with an inscription by Naram-Sin, found at Pir Hüseyin (eastern Turkey). Museum of the Ancient Orient, Istanbul.

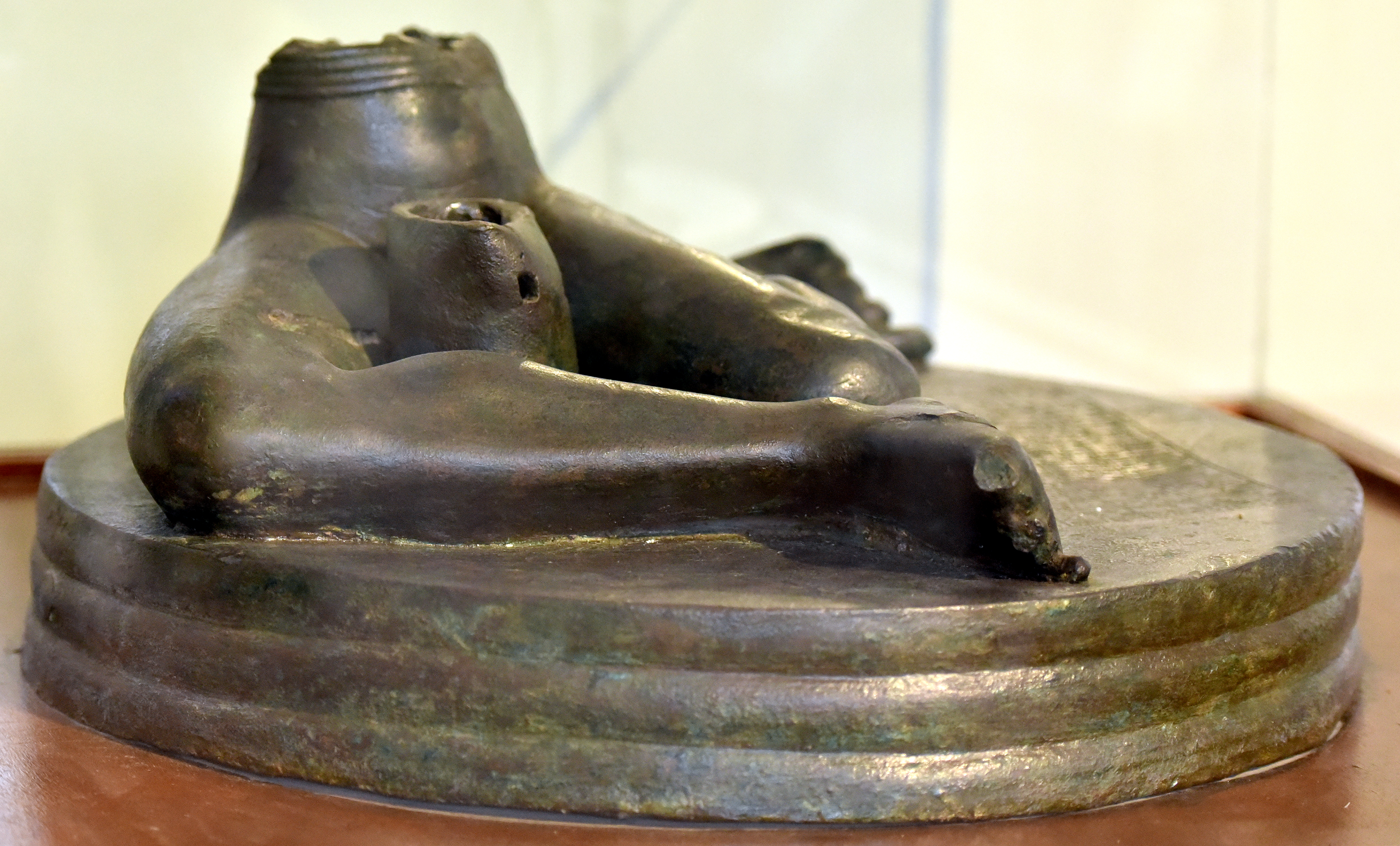
Fragmentary copper alloy Bassetki Statue, bearing an inscription commemorating the deification of Naram-Sin. National Museum of Iraq.

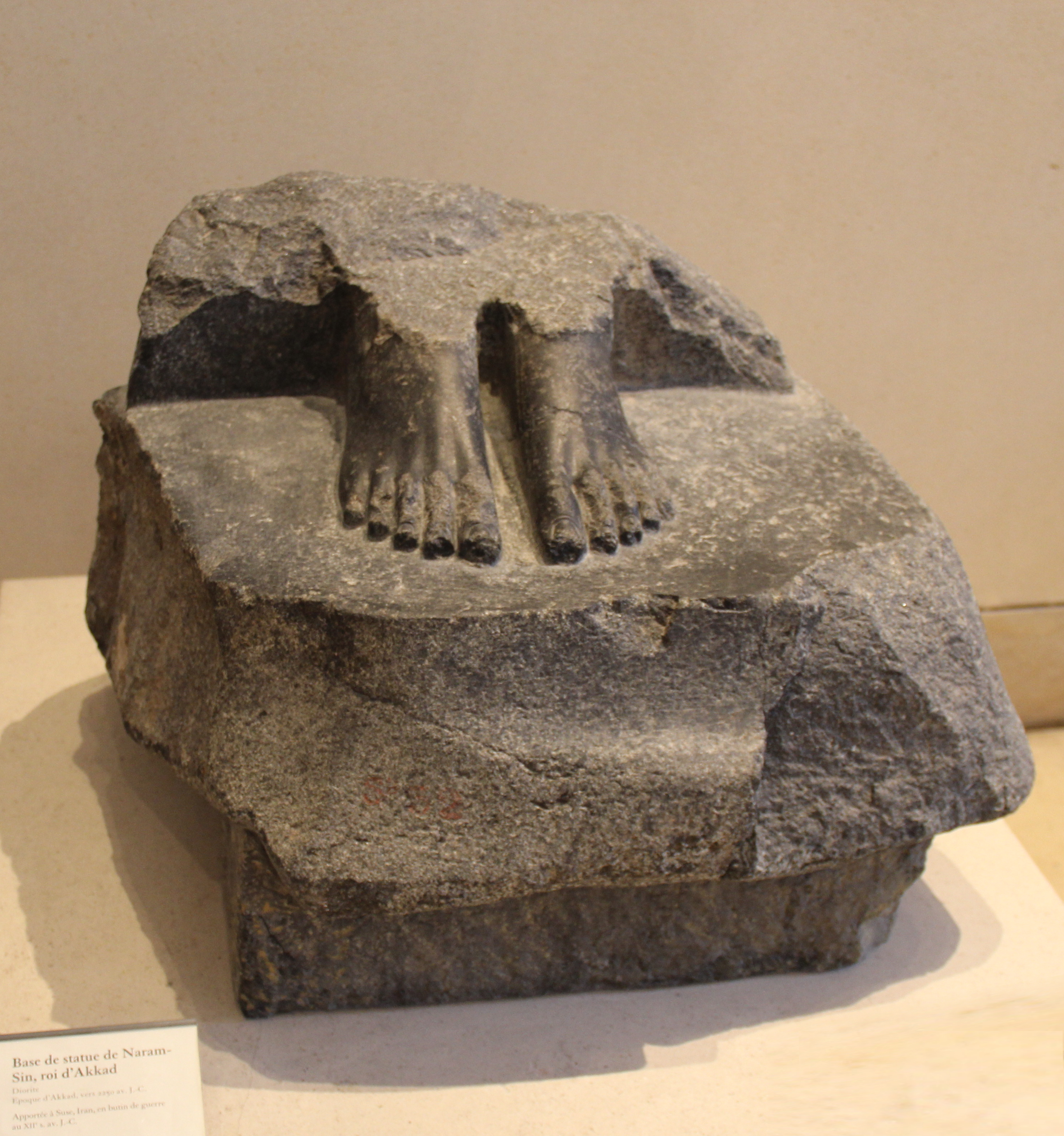
Broken diorite statue base bearing an inscription by Naram-Sin commemorating the victory over the land of Magan. Found in Susa. Louvre Museum.

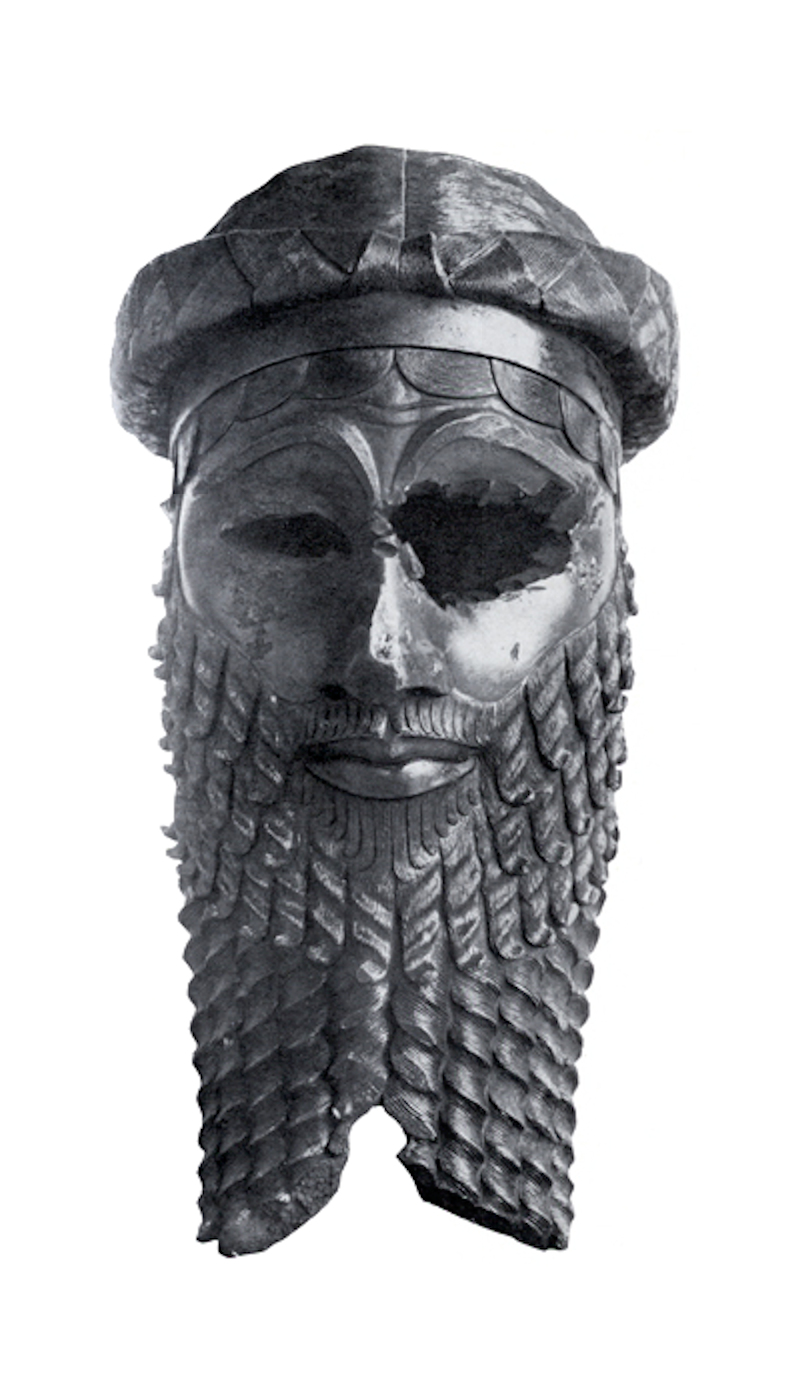
Head of an Akkadian king, possibly Naram-Sin, made of a copper alloy, found in the Temple of Ishtar in Nineveh. National Museum of Iraq.

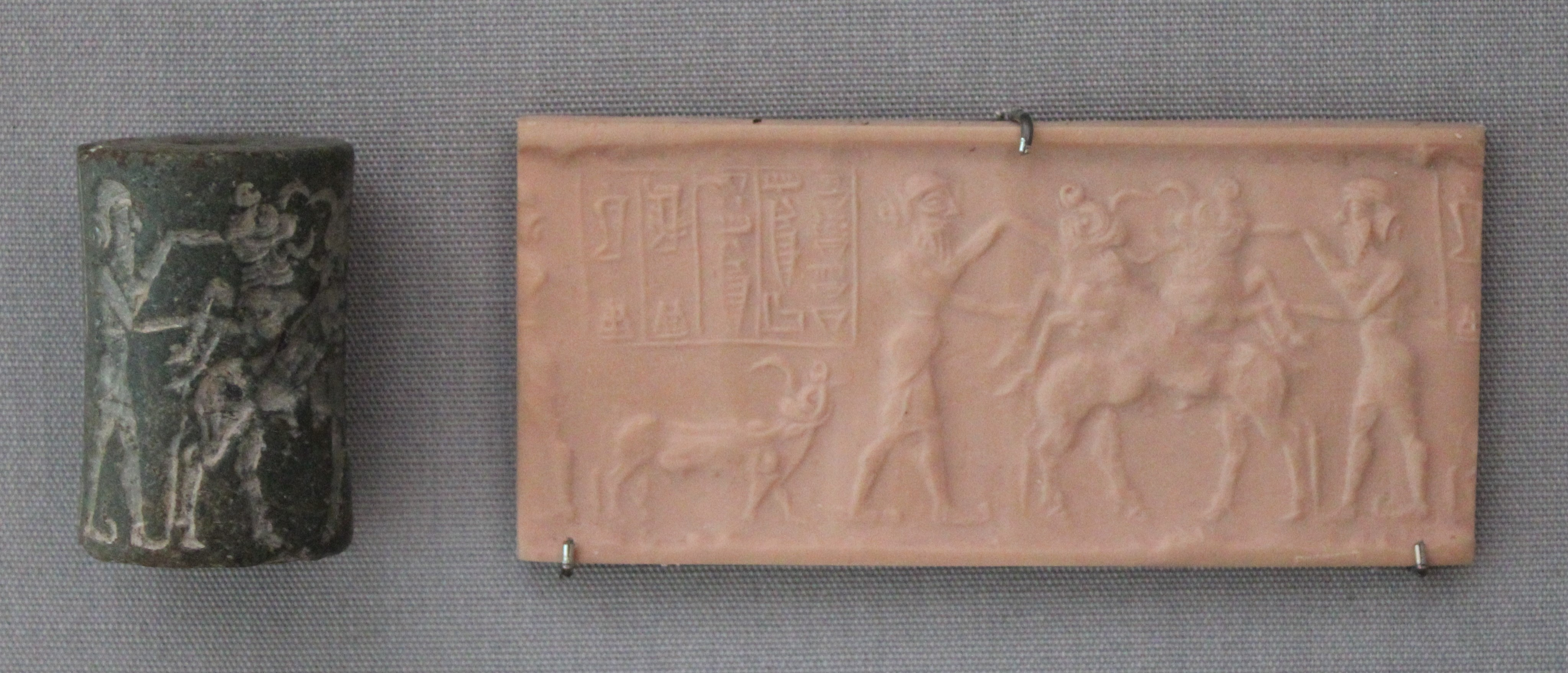
Cylinder seal with a modern impression, belonging to Asu, a servant of Prince Bin-kali-sharri, depicting a battle scene. British Museum.

The expression of the power of the kings of Akkad is also found in another major art form of the period, that of cylinder seals: glyptics. An analysis of the imagery on the seals of members of the royal family and their servants during the reign of Naram-Sin (and Shar-kali-sharri) has revealed that the majority of them depict combat scenes, showing heroes fighting animals.

==== The Victory Stele ====
The most famous monument from the reign of Naram-Sin is his “Victory Stele.” It was excavated at Susa in southwestern Iran, ancient Elam. This is not its original context, since it was taken there in the middle of the 12th century BC when the Elamites sacked several Mesopotamian cities and carried off numerous works of art to their country.

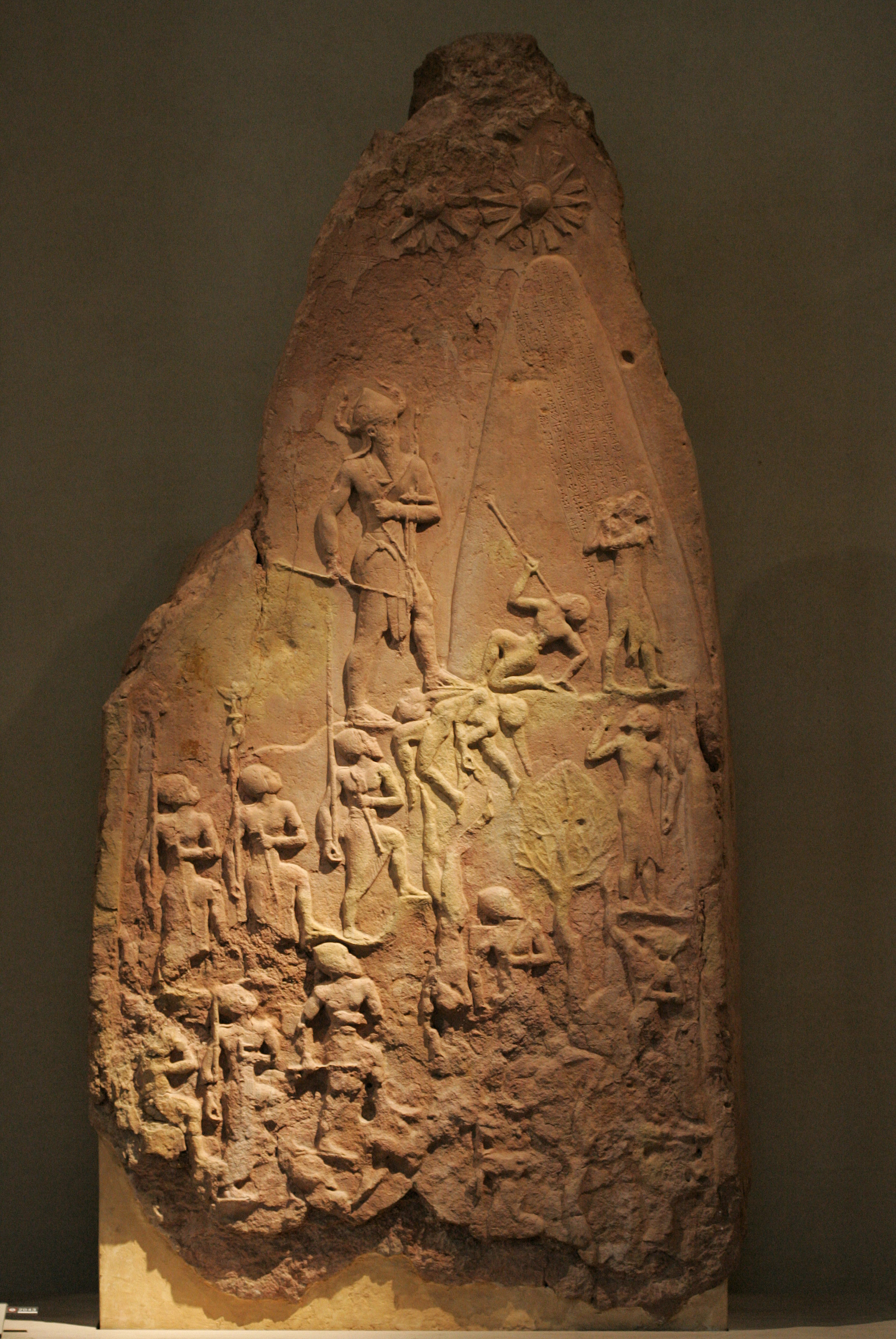
The Victory Stele of Naram-Sin, Louvre Museum.

This large (2 meters tall and 1.05 meters wide) stele is made from pinkish limestone. It commemorates a victory by Naram-Sin over the mountainous country of Lullubum, as described in an inscription in the upper left corner, most of which has been destroyed (the inscription on the mountain on the right is a later addition by the Elamite king who took the stele as booty). In a mountainous landscape, the Akkadian troops have defeated their enemies, who are depicted as dead, dying, or pleading for mercy. The Akkadian troops are marching toward the summit, following their king, who is depicted in heroic proportions. He is shown bare-chested, wearing a loincloth, crowned with the horned tiara symbolizing divinity, and armed with a bow and a spear. Celestial symbols, perhaps representing deities, are depicted in the sky above him. This stele depicts the favorite themes of the Akkadian kings: military victory and the demonstration of their dominant status. The evolution of royal ideology during the reign of Naram-Sin thus gave rise to a novel form of royal representation, in which "the might of the transitory and earthly kingship was combined with the concept of the divine in a new visual rhetoric."

=== Inscriptions ===
≠The commemorative inscriptions found on the monuments and votive objects of the kings of Akkad and their close servants also demonstrate a high degree of artistic refinement. They reflect a pursuit of visual elegance similar to that seen in the images, whether through the choice of their placement on the object or the care taken in the carving of the cuneiform signs. As for the language, while the early Akkadian kings practiced Sumerian-Akkadian bilingualism, the inscriptions of Naram-Sin reveal a marked preference for Akkadian. Their prose also reflects a stylistic refinement: the texts become increasingly lengthy and employ complex turns of phrase. Triumphal inscriptions celebrating military victories—originally inscribed on monuments that were likely just as remarkable—are a hallmark of this period (earlier rulers generally included their victory accounts in inscriptions that also mentioned their pious deeds), and they went on to inspire subsequent generations. This is eloquently demonstrated in the long inscription commemorating the victory over the Great Revolt, which is one of the longest known official inscriptions of the 3rd millennium BC and, according to B. Foster, "a masterpiece of its kind."

Naram-Sin the mighty, emissary of Ishtar his goddess, king of Agade and king [of the four quarters of the earth, attendant of Anu], governor for Enlil, general for Ilaba, who reached(?) the sources of the Irnina River, who defended Agade, who showed forth might to all kings, what no king has experienced since the creation of the human race, an attack by all four quarters of the earth together, when Naram-Sin the mighty was emissary of Ishtar, all four quarters of the earth attacked him together and challenged him. [... By the verdict of ... Naram-Sin the mighty], emissary of Ishtar, was victorious over them in the battle of [...] [by] verdict of Enlil, father of the gods, with the weapon of Ilaba his lord, and restored their freedom. Further ..., he he[ard of it], he crossed and conquered Magan, in the midst of the sea, and washed his weapons in the Lower Sea.

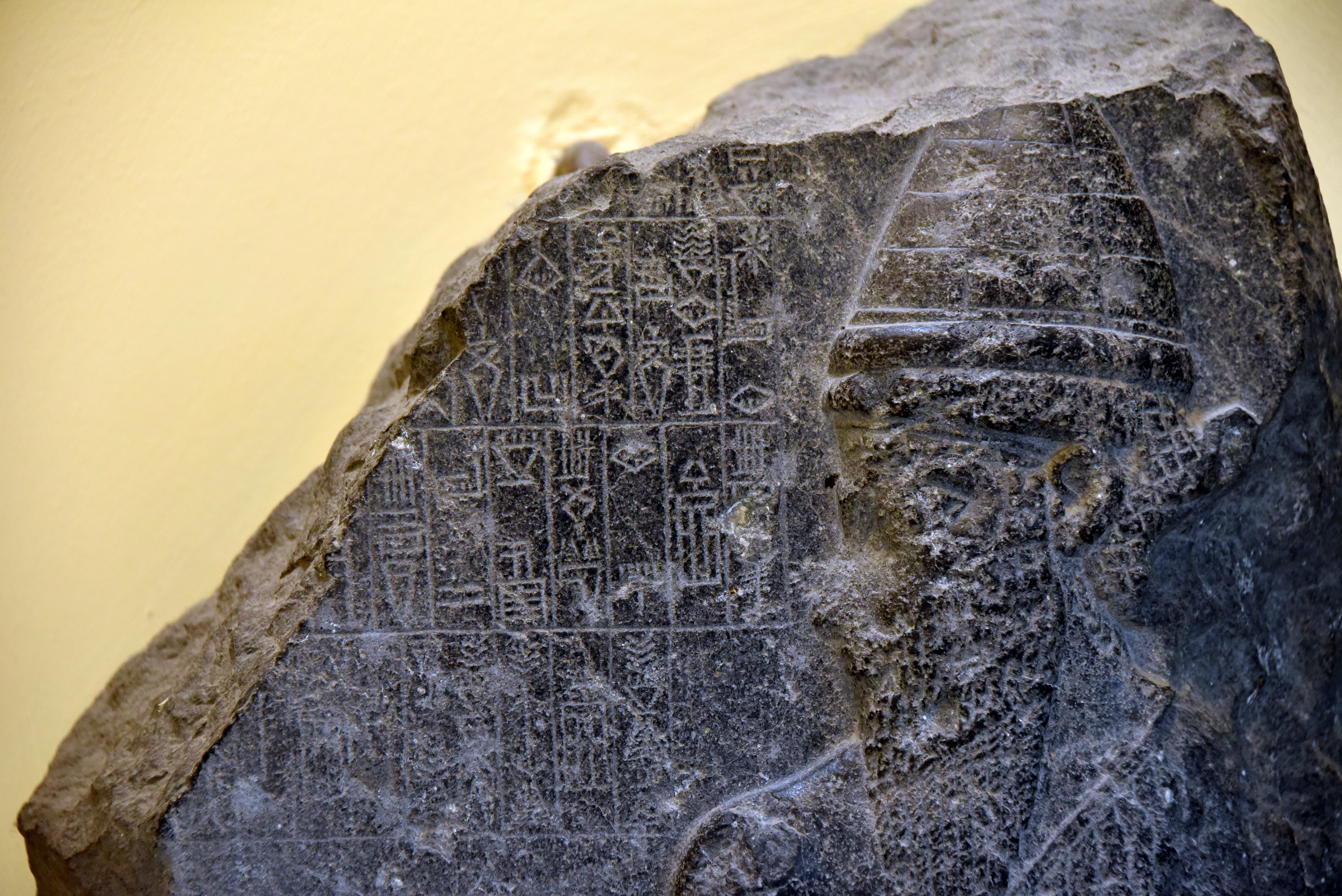
Detail of the inscription on the Pir Hüseyin stele. Museum of the Ancient Orient, Istanbul.

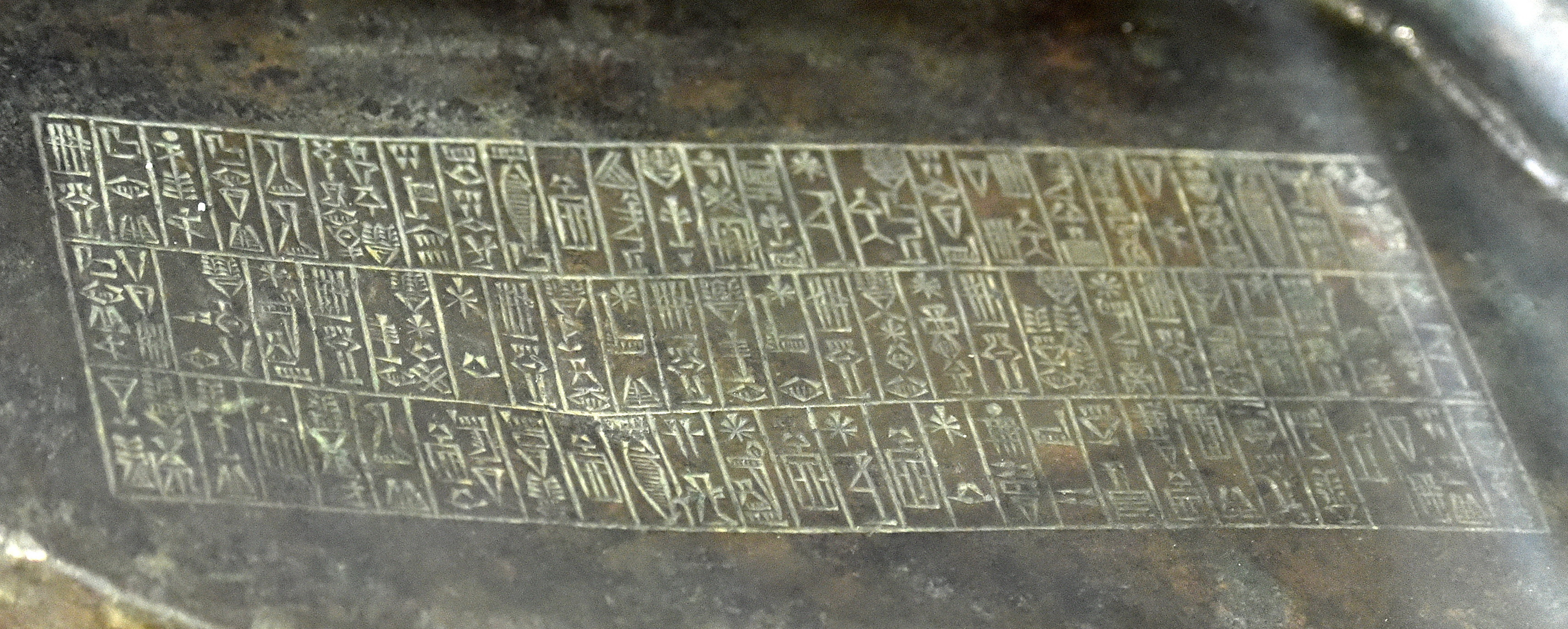
The inscription on the Bassetki Statue. Iraqi National Museum.

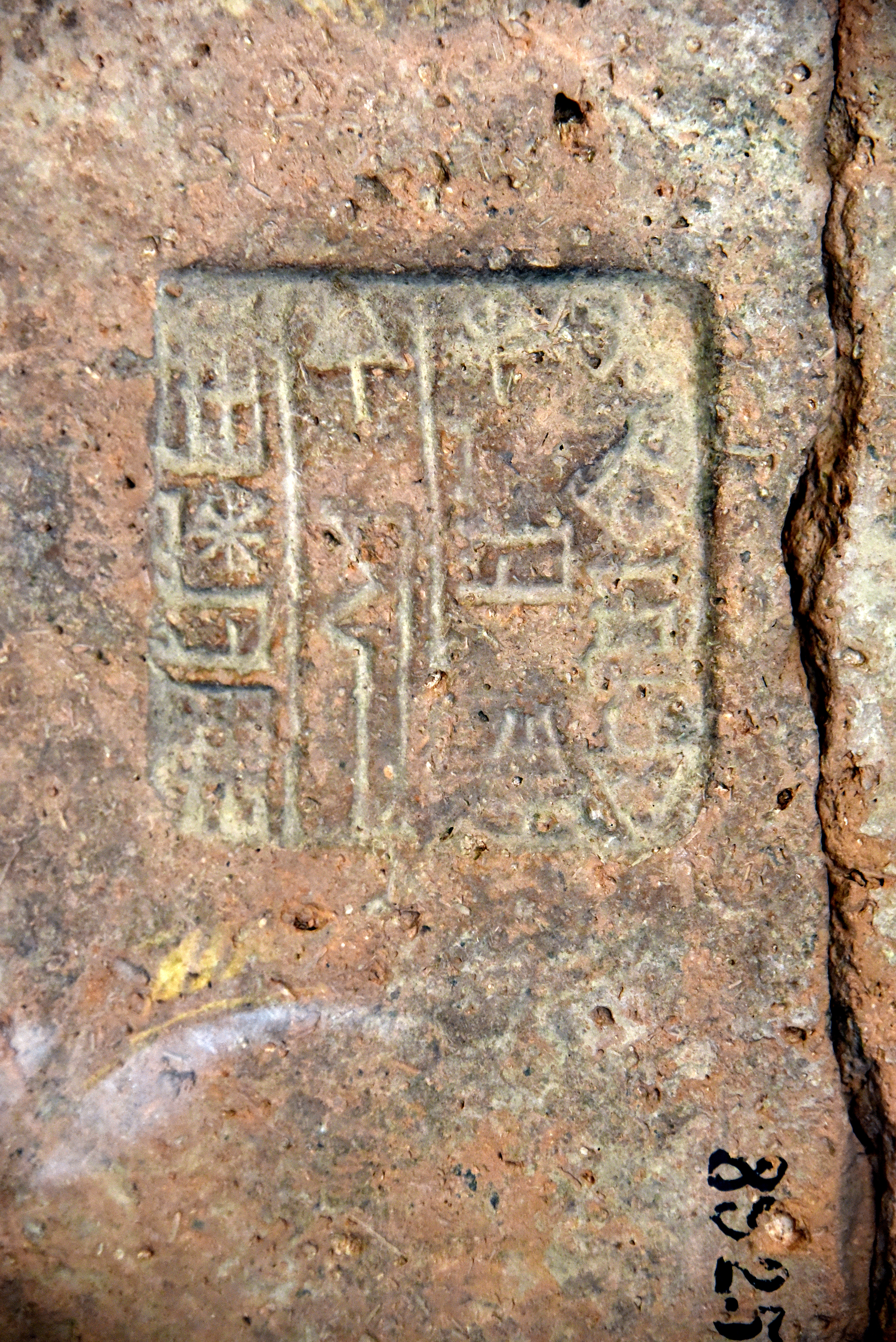
Mudbrick stamped with the name of Naram-Sin. Museum of the Ancient Orient, Istanbul.

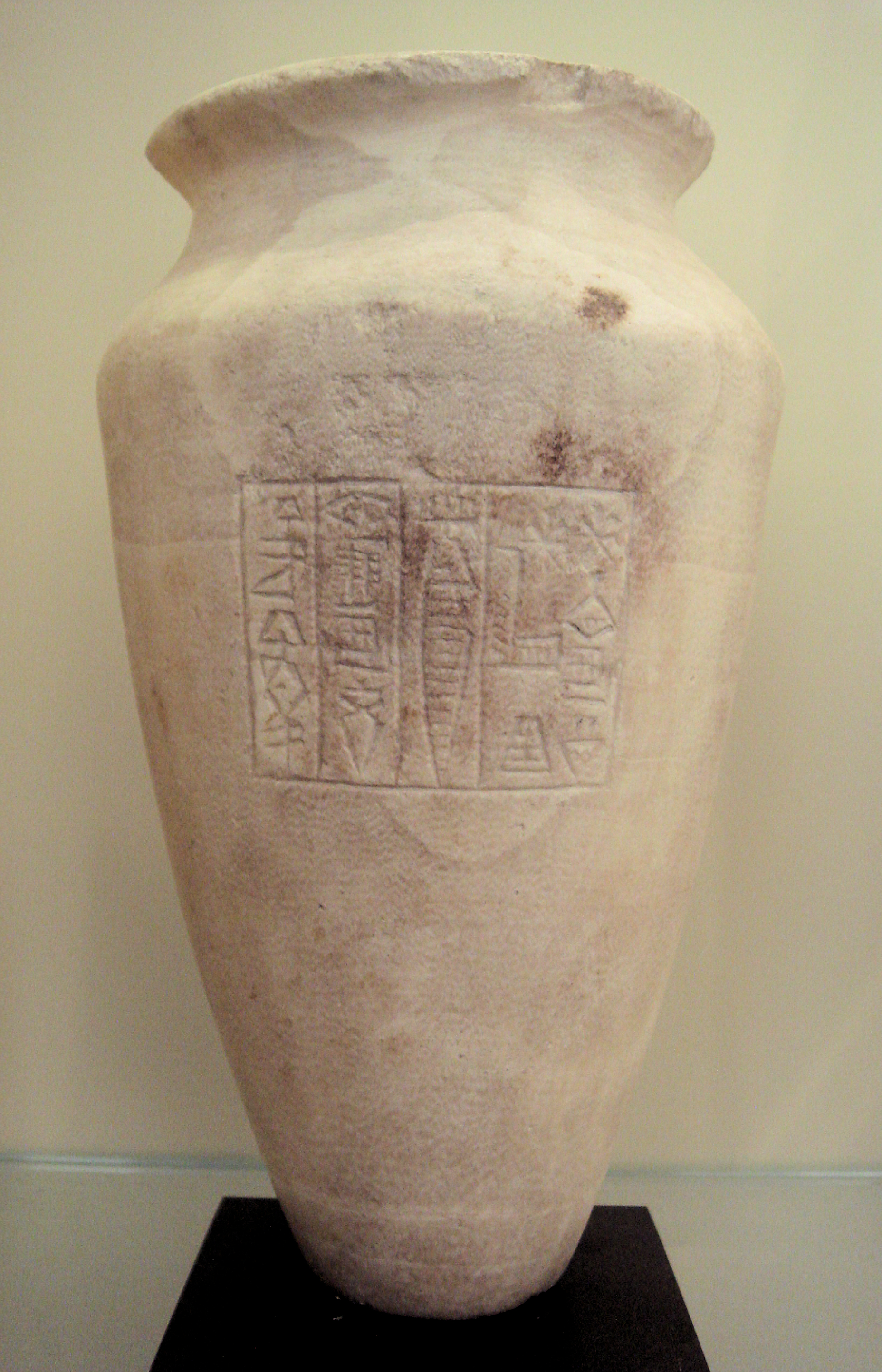
Limestone vase bearing the inscription "Naram-Sin, King of the Four Corners." Girsu, Louvre Museum.

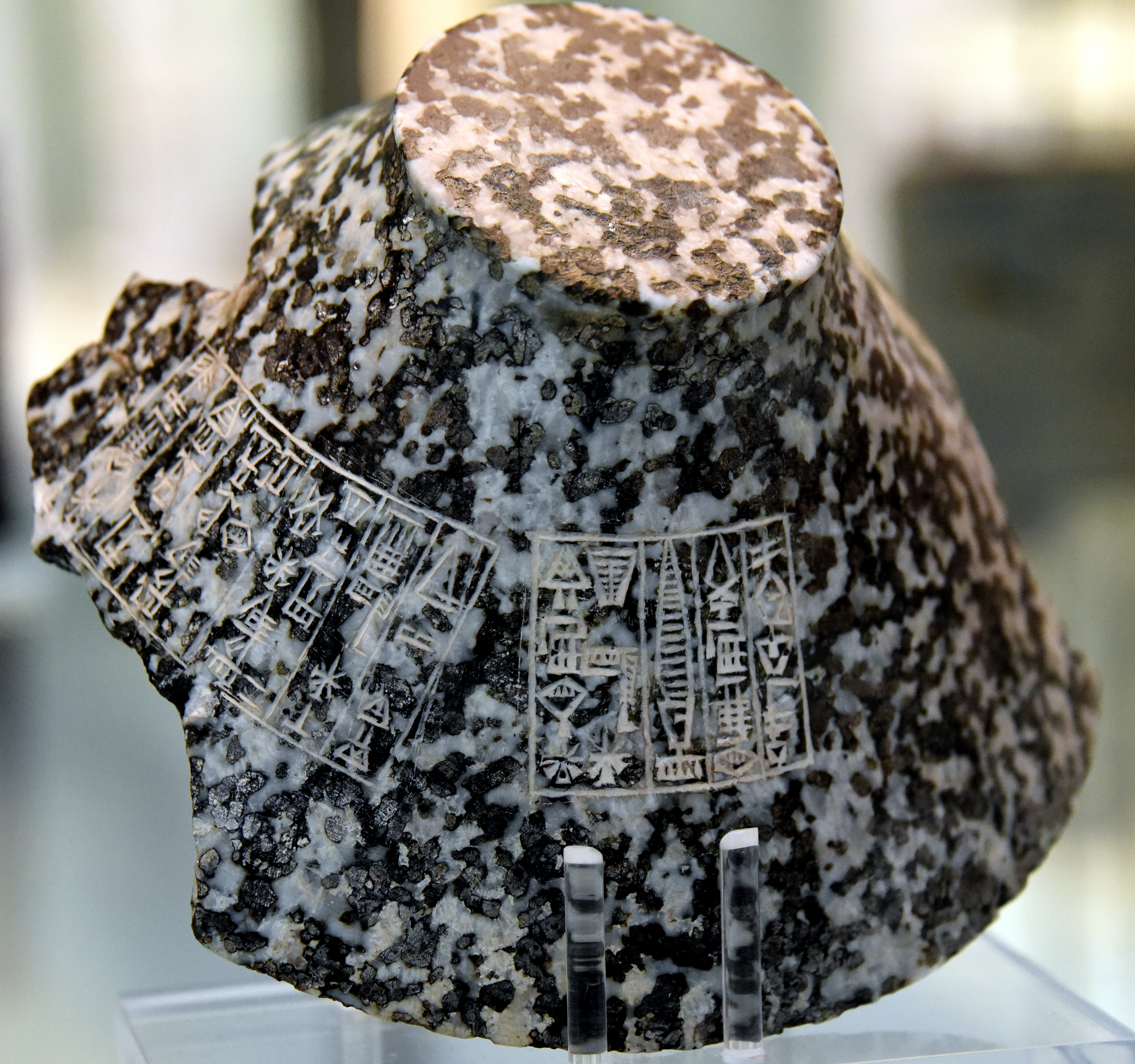
Fragment of a vase bearing the inscription "Naram-Sin, King of the Four Corners" (inscription on the right). An inscription by a daughter of King Shulgi of Ur (c. 2094–2047 BCE) was added to it (on the left). Ur, British Museum.

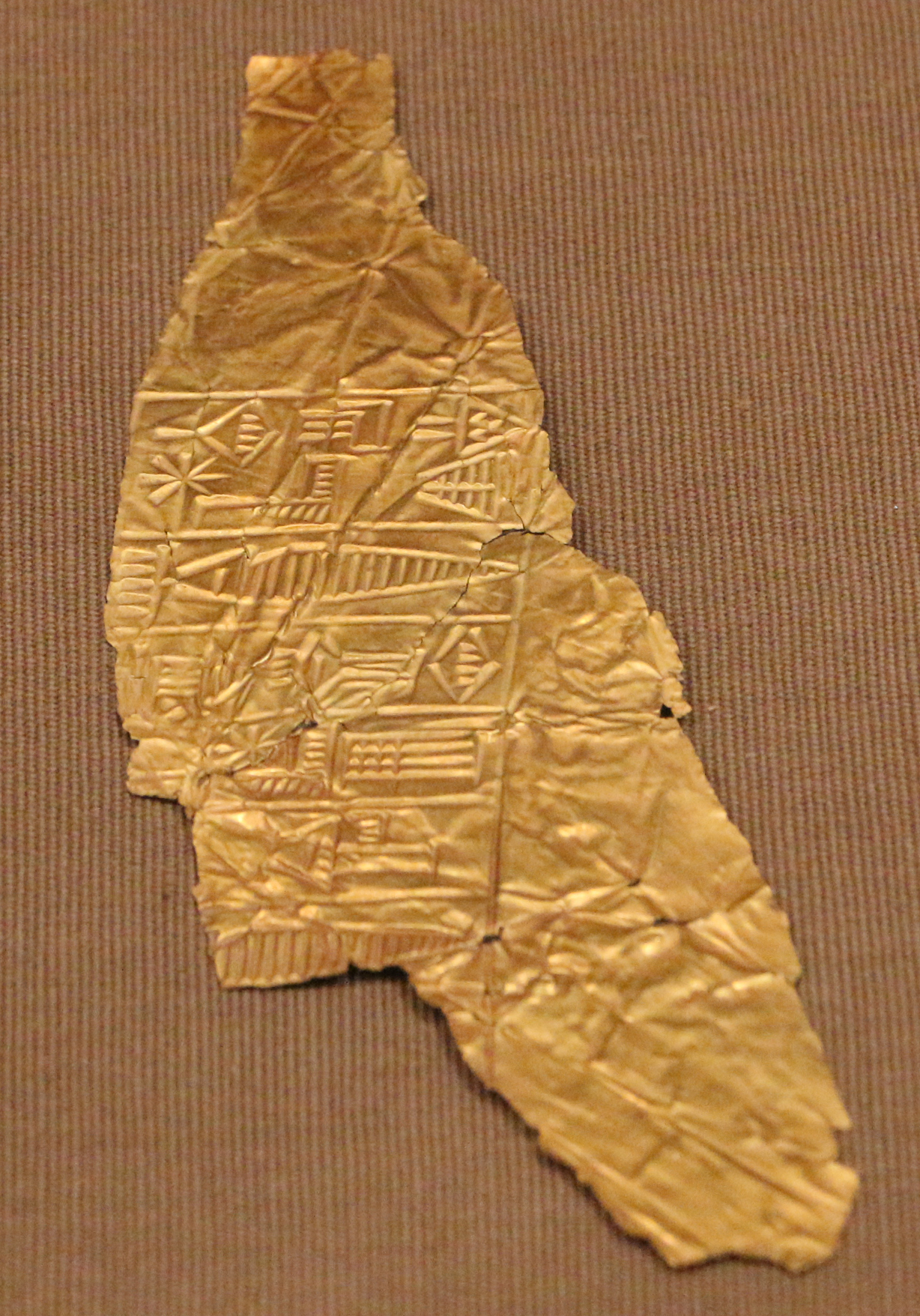
Gold leaf bearing an inscription with the name of a servant of Naram-Sin, whose name is uncertain because it is on a break in the piece (Warad-Enlil?). Adab, museum of the Institute for the Study of Ancient Cultures.

=== The king and the gods ===
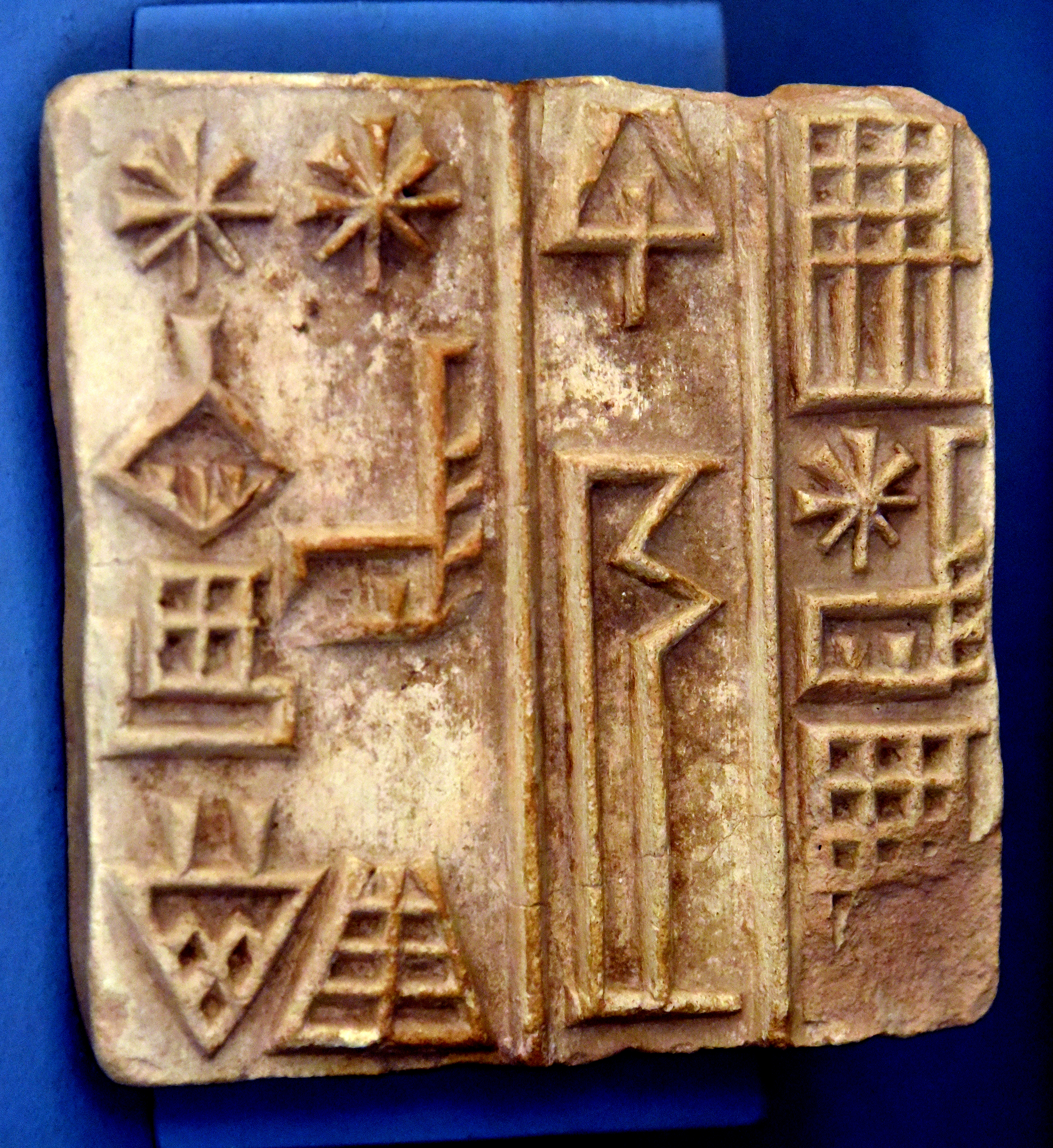
A terracotta stamp used to imprint bricks, bearing an inscription commemorating the reconstruction of the temple of Enlil in Nippur by Naram-Sin. Museum of the Ancient Orient, Istanbul. Translation of the inscription: "Naram-Sin, builder of the Temple of the god Enlil."

In addition to the deification of the king, the Akkadian period saw a reorganization of the Mesopotamian divine order, which until then had been organized primarily at the city-state level—a first step toward the formation of a Lower Mesopotamian official pantheon, aimed once again at consolidating the empire’s unity through religious ideology. This is particularly evident in the list of deities found in the official texts of Naram-Sin. Following in Sargon’s footsteps, Naram-Sin dedicated several of his daughters to deities so that they might become high priestesses of their sanctuaries (see below). Sources indicate, however, that despite the fact that his name means “Beloved of Sin,” this king, like his predecessors, primarily revered the god Enlil and the goddess Ishtar.

Enlil is the king of the gods and the god of kingship. The kings of Akkad accorded special treatment to his sanctuary in Nippur, the Ekur (its administration was separate from that of the city), and showered it with offerings, all with the aim of promoting Enlil as the state deity, a constant supporter of the rulers in their hegemonic endeavors. Naram-Sin was crowned in his temple, and brought the rebellious kings there after he had quelled the Great Revolt. He also installed his daughter Tuttunab-shum there, where she became high priestess of the god Enlil. And he went even further by initiating a major project to rebuild the sanctuary (documented in administrative texts), which was part of the measures he undertook to celebrate his victory and consolidate the unity of the empire; these projects were completed by his son.

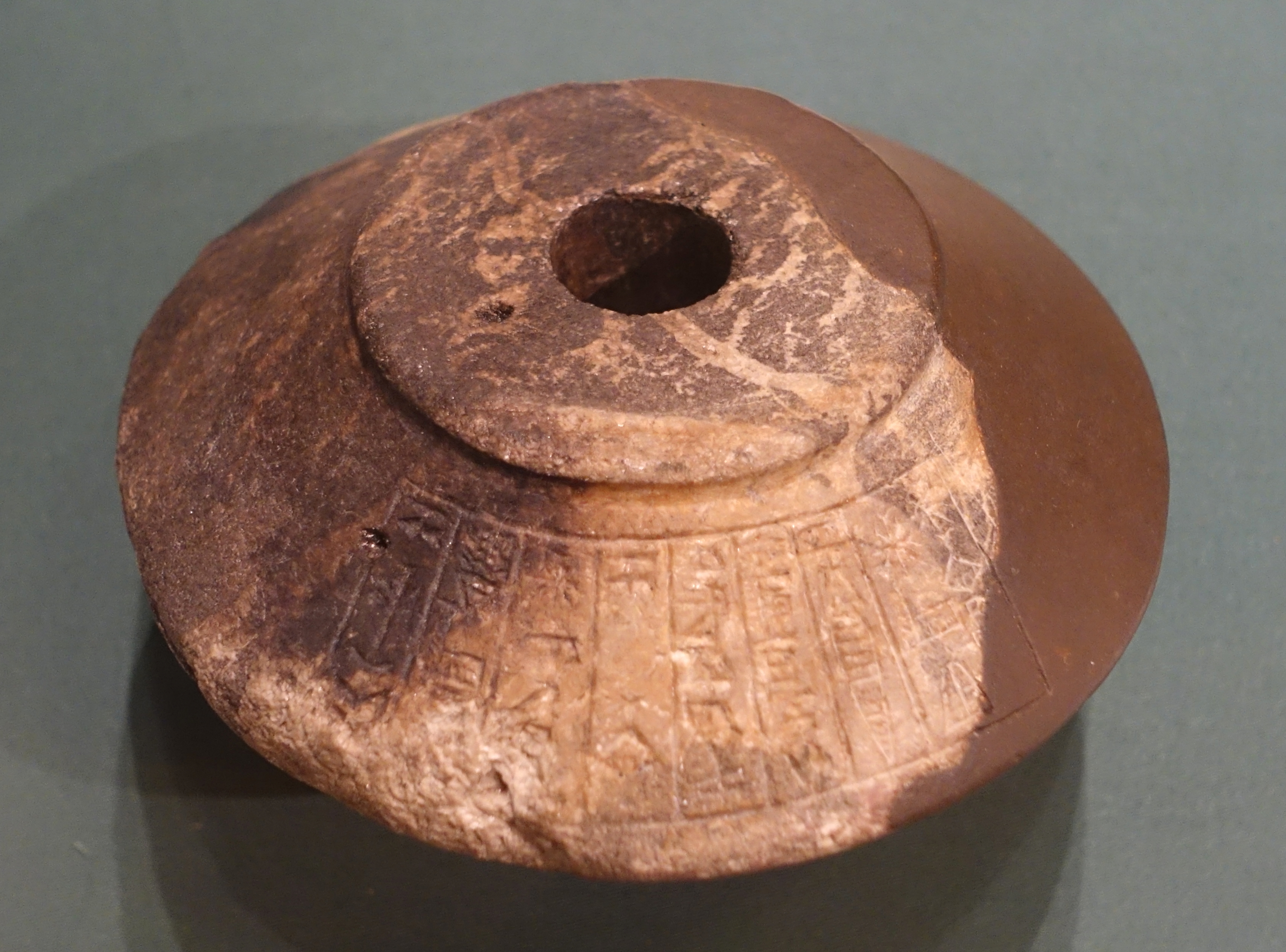
Stone mace head, dedicated by Naram-Sin to Ishtar in her temple of Nippur. Museum of the Institute for the Study of Ancient Cultures. Translation of the inscription: "Naram-Sin, king of the four quarters, dedicated (this mace) to the goddess Ishtar at Nippur.

The goddess Ishtar (Inanna in Sumer), who is both a manifestation of the planet Venus and the goddess of war and love, is the chief goddess of the city of Akkad and the protector of the Akkadian dynasty. Naram-Sin presents her as his beloved: in commemorating his victory over the Great Revolt, he proclaims that he triumphed “on account of the love that Ishtar bore him.” A stone mold found depicts them side by side, towering over chained figures symbolizing conquered lands. The king undertook construction projects at several temples dedicated to the goddess: Zabalam, Adab, Nineveh, and Akkad.

== Exercise of power ==
The king reigns at the pinnacle of his kingdom, where responsibilities are then divided among members of the civil administration and those of the military administration. It is unclear whether there was a sort of 'council' assisting the ruler in making the most crucial decisions. He relied heavily on his family to govern, but more broadly, the kingdom was conceived as a sort of extended family in which he served as the patriarchal figure, granting and revoking offices, honors, and favors as he saw fit.

=== Royal family ===
There is no evidence of tensions within the royal family during Naram-Sin’s reign (unlike previous reigns), and he relied heavily on his family to rule his empire. The name of the queen, Naram-Sin’s chief wife, is unknown, as is the case with most Akkadian queens. We do know, however, that she possessed her own estates and designated servants. In contrast, the names of several of her children are known.

His sons, in particular, were granted important roles in the administration of the empire’s affairs. The crown prince Shar-kali-sharri accompanied him on a military campaign and was tasked with overseeing the reconstruction of the temple of the god Enlil in Nippur. Other princes were appointed as provincial governors, such as Lipit-ili in Marad, known from an inscription commemorating the reconstruction of the temple of the great local god Lugal-marda, which also mentions his father’s triumph over the Great Revolt. A recently found cylinder seal, looted from Urasagrig, shows that the governor there, Sharatigubishin, was also a son of Naram-Sin.

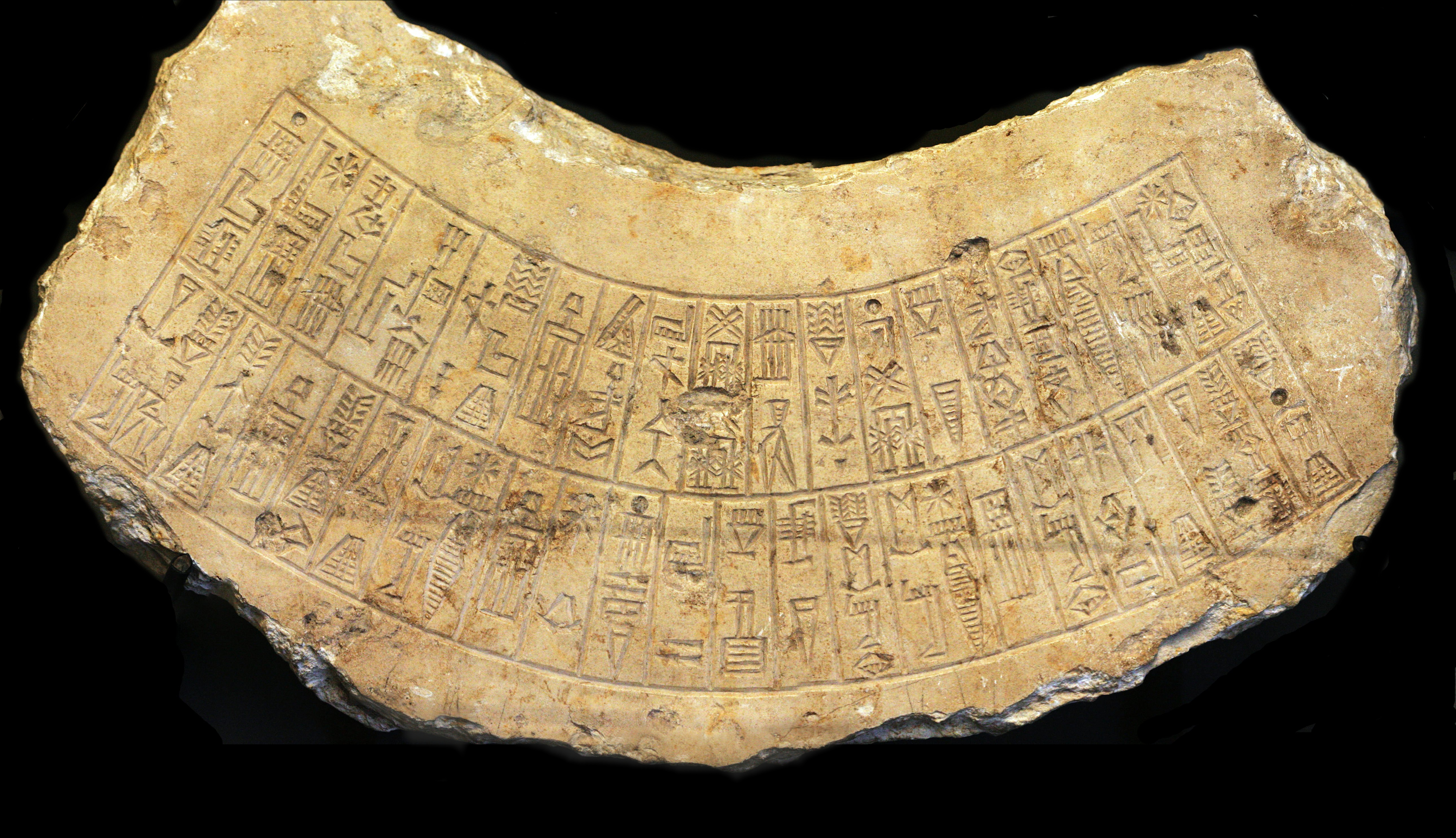
Inscription recounting the reconstruction of the temple at Marad by Lipit-Ili. Louvre Museum.
Translation of the inscription: "Naram-Sin, the mighty, king of the four quarters, victor in nine battles in one year: After he was victorious in those battles, he captured their three kings and brought (them) before the god Enlil, At that time, Lipit-ih, his son, governor of Marad, built the temple of the god Lugalmarda at Marad. As for the one who removes this inscription, may the gods Samas and Lugalmarda tear out his foundation and destroy his progeny."

As for his daughters, at least three of them were granted major positions in the cult, that of high priestess (entu/en) of a major deity of the pantheon: Enmenanna in Ur (where she succeeded Enheduanna), Shumshani in Sippar, and Tuttunab-shum in Nippur. At least two of these appointments were commemorated by year names, that indicate the priestesses were chosen following a divinatory procedure. Other were used to serve their fathers’ diplomatic interests. This appears to be the case with Taram-Agade (“She Who Loves Akkad”), whose seal impression was found in the palace at Tell Mozan, ancient Urkesh, which is generally interpreted to mean that she was married to the local ruler, an ally of her father. Her sister Simat-Ulmash may have played the same role in Mari, where a copper platter bearing her name was found. It is possible that other diplomatic marriages involved children of Naram-Sin, including a son who is said to have been wed to a princess from Marhashi.

=== Ruling elite ===
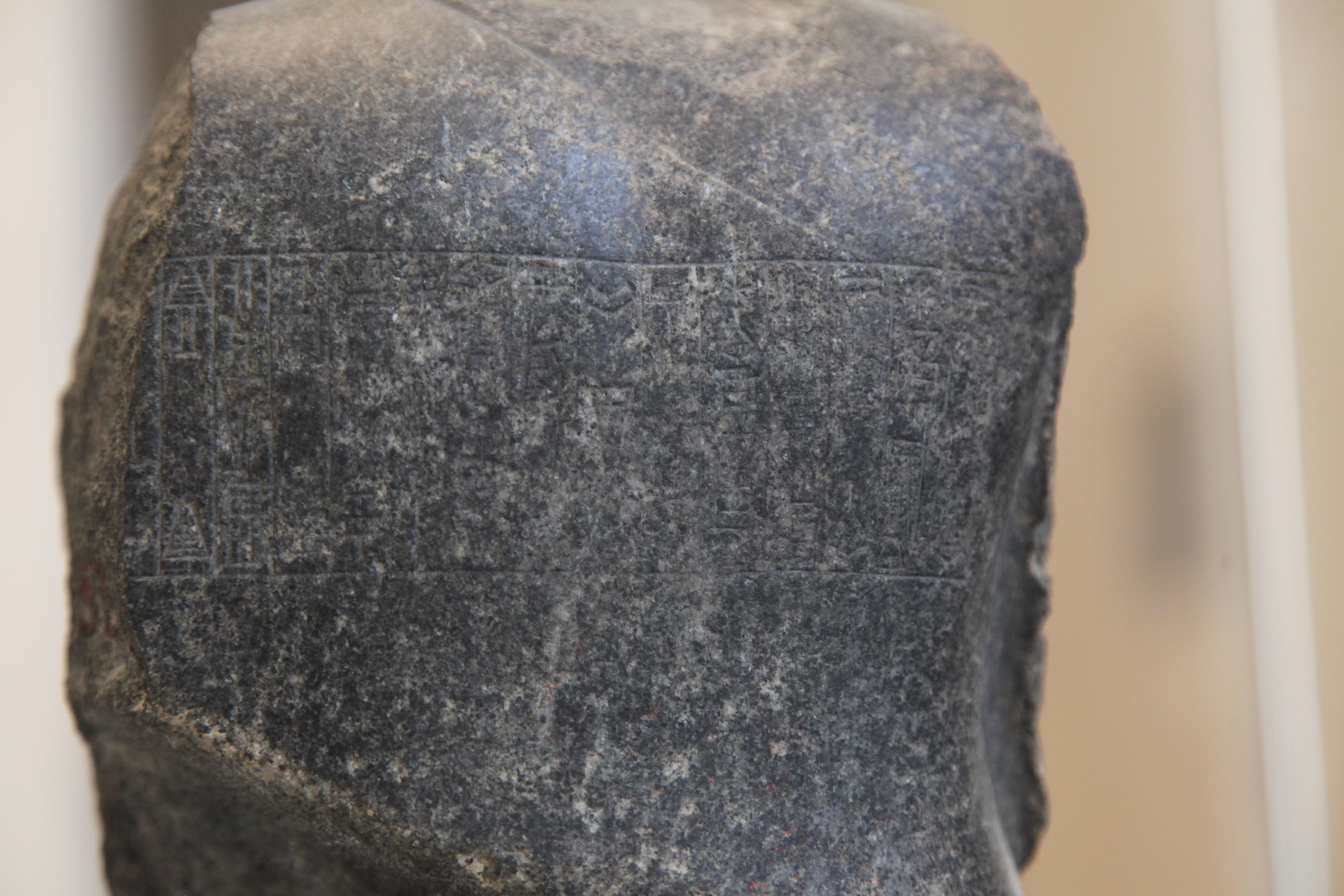
Fragment of a diorite statue dedicated by the steward Shuash-takal to the life of Naram-Sin. Susa, Louvre Museum.

The most important figure in the civil administration was the “household steward” or “majordomo,” šāpirum (Sumerian šabra-é), whose specific role was to manage the king’s household—that is, the palace and its associated estates. During the reign of Naram-Sin, this position was held successively by Shuash-takal and Yetib-Mer, who remained in office under Shar-kali-sharri. After him, another important figure was the head of the land registry or "registrar," šassukkum (Sumerian sag-dùn), who oversaw the crown lands, managed their administrative records, purchased new lands, and, above all, granted them to the king’s servants. He had numerous scribes working under him who manage the kingdom’s offices and estates. The key figures in the military were the “generals,” šakkanakkum (Sumerian šagina), who headed the garrisons stationed at strategic locations throughout the empire and played a leading role in the outlying territories.

These high-ranking figures were associated not only with the exercise of power but also with the appropriation of resources from conquered lands. In particular, they received estates taken from provincial agricultural lands, from which they were expected to get the resources necessary to carry out their duties—and likely more. The majordomo Yetib-Mer held around a thousand hectares of land in the provinces of Umma and Lagash alone. This served as both a reward and a form of compensation. The dependence of these various figures on the king was thereby only reinforced, and with it their loyalty. Indeed, they lacked a local base, had estates scattered across several locations, and owed their success solely to the king or his family—and thus to personal ties.

=== Military organization ===
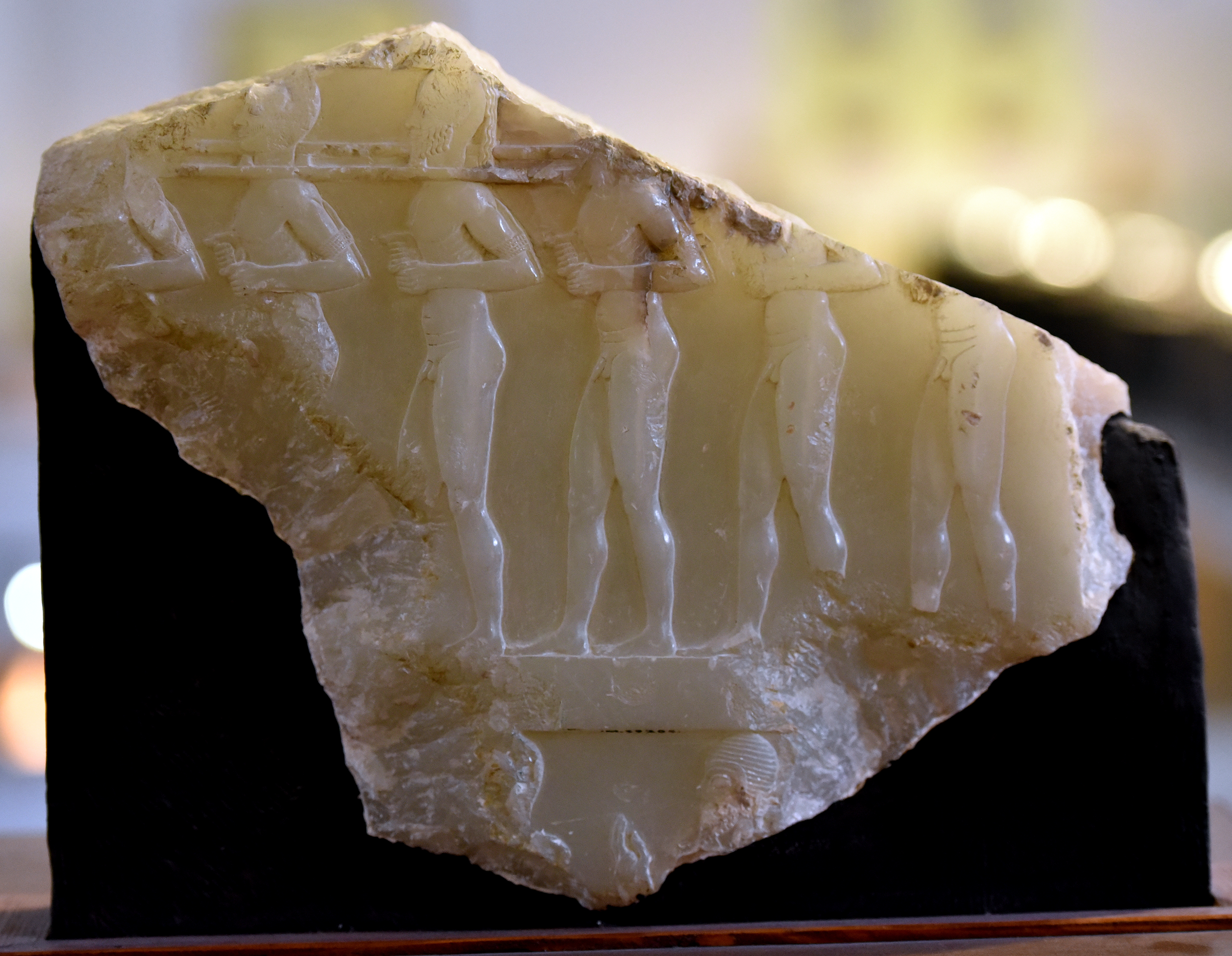
Akkadian victory stele (from the reign of Naram-Sin?) depicting enemy captives held in shackles. Nasiriyah region. Iraqi National Museum.

The army was the primary instrument of domination for the Akkadian kings, whose power had a very pronounced military character. The king was the supreme commander of the armies, which he led in person onto the battlefield. Little is known about the Akkadian military organization. The army corps were led by "generals," šakkanakkum (Sumerian šagina). An inscription by Naram-Sin, which echoes an earlier one from the time of his grandfather Sargon, mentions the "Nine Regiments of Akkad," which appear to have been the core of the army, a standing force.

Naram-Sin’s army was a war machine unmatched in its time and without known precedent, due to its ability to string together victories and, in particular, to conduct distant expeditions. His troops consisted of infantry armed with spears, axes, slings, and composite bows, which undoubtedly played a decisive role in his successes. It is quite difficult to determine exactly what tactics they employed, but based on visual depictions, they appear to have been characterized by their lightness and thus their mobility, in contrast to the more heavily equipped armies of earlier periods.

The Akkadian military system, which developed outside Lower Mesopotamia during the reign of Naram-Sin, relied on a network of military and agricultural settlements, exemplified by Susa, Gasur, Nagar, and Awal. In Lower Mesopotamia, the military presence is attested by several records from the reign of Naram-Sin: a garrison of soldiers is attested at Nippur; in Pugdan (near Kish), land was granted to captains and soldiers so that they would have the means to equip themselves. The fact that the Akkadian government took possession of large estates was likely motivated in large part by the need for resources to maintain its military power.

Military victories resulted in looting, the capture of enemies, and even their execution. The defeated enemies are depicted on monuments, sometimes dead or dying, or begging for mercy, or at other times taken prisoner. The lengthy inscription on the Great Revolt repeatedly lists the enemy leaders who were captured and their soldiers killed by the hundreds or even thousands. The rebellious cities were destroyed, and Kish was deliberately flooded.

=== Provincial administration ===
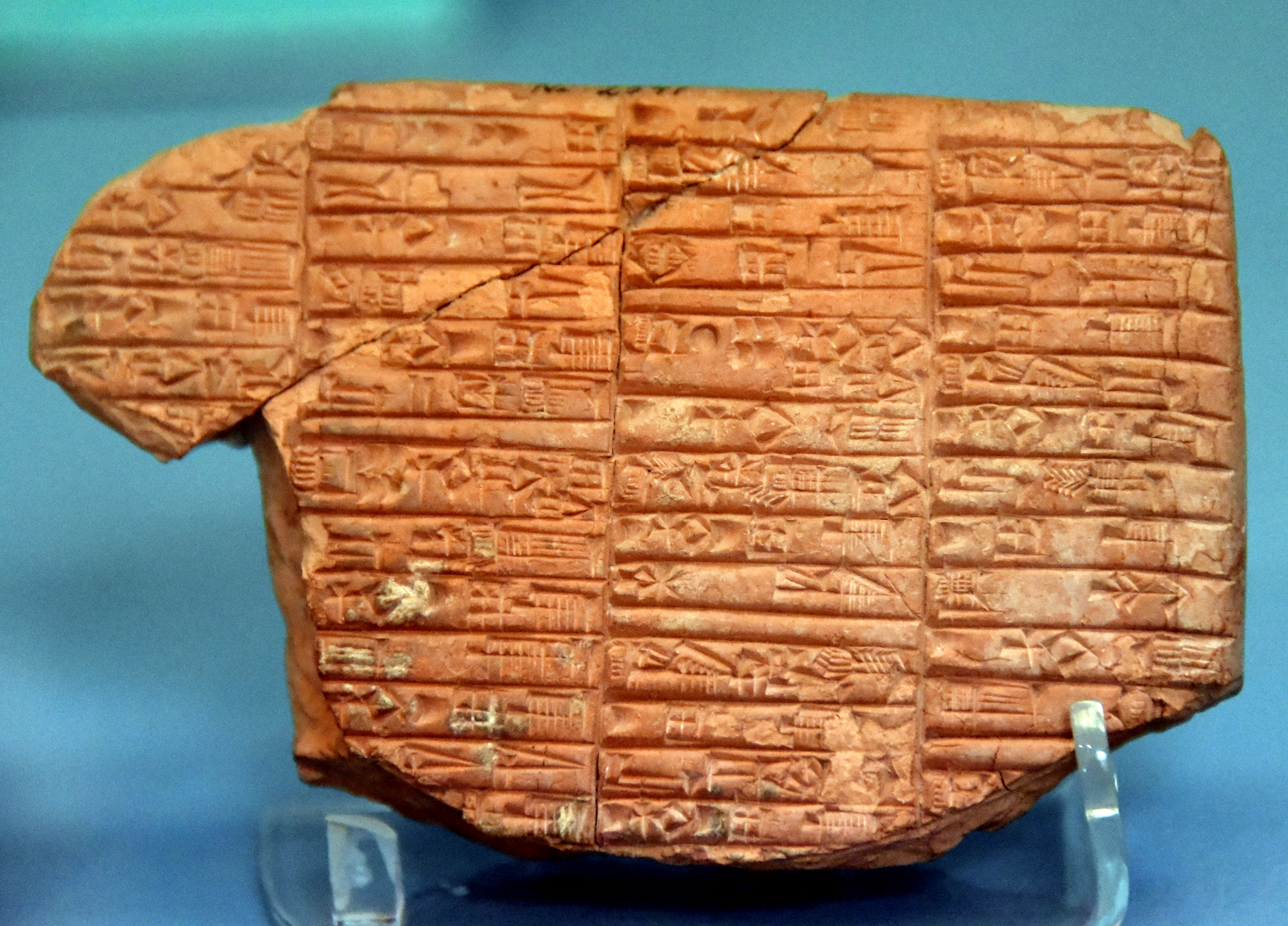
Clay tablet from the Akkadian archives of Nippur, listing livestock. Museum of the Ancient Orient, Istanbul..

There is a much larger body of administrative documentation available for the reign of Naram-Sin than for those of his predecessors. The reign of his son Shar-kali-sharri is even better documented. Since the administration functioned similarly during these two reigns, these sources provide at least a rough idea of how the empire was administered in its central provinces. This period saw a strengthening of Akkadian authority over its provinces. The administrative centers came under increasingly tight control by the royal administration. The ruler repeatedly dispatched some of his most loyal servants to conduct inspections on his behalf and report back to him.

In the northern provinces, higher offices and estates were often entrusted directly to members of the royal family. Geographical proximity to the capital strengthened ties with the central government. An archive from Khafajah, ancient Tutub, in the lower Diyala Valley, indicates that its governor at one point was Prince Nabi-Ulmash.

The situation in the southern provinces—the Sumerian heartland—was different: the governors were often of local origin and appear to have greater autonomy than those in the north, even though they were subject to the king’s orders, required to supply laborers, and obligated to pay taxes to the central government. Akkadian control over the southern provinces was also reflected in the establishment of autonomous administrative centers, led by some of the king’s trusted officials, in accordance with the practices of the land of Akkad. It went with a clear and deliberate intent to isolate them from the rest of the provincial administration in order to weaken local structures and strengthen the influence of the central government, and also to support the garrisons it maintained there. This type of estate is primarily documented from the reign of Naram-Sin onward, although it existed before; many of them were likely established as a result of confiscations that took place after the Great Revolt.

The archives from the reigns of Naram-Sin and Shar-kali-sharri also attest to the spread of properly 'Akkadian' administrative practices, which are found throughout the empire to varying degrees. This is clearly the result of reforms and a desire for centralization and harmonization, which were likely initiated during the reign of Naram-Sin, making it a pivotal moment in the history of Mesopotamian administrative and accounting practices. This is especially reflected by the growing use of Akkadian units of measurement and of the Akkadian calendar; standardization of cuneiform writing, at least at the upper and middle levels of the royal administration; changes in sealing practices.

The extent of this consolidation of royal power over the provinces is difficult to assess: some scholars advocate a 'strong' view of central authority, which seized large tracts of land and regularly intervened in provincial affairs—particularly to extract their resources—while others, on the other hand, emphasize that provincial governors retained a significant degree of autonomy, that the king’s control was primarily indirect, and that he did not attempt to control the majority of his territories’ resources.

=== Peripheral regions and foreign relations ===
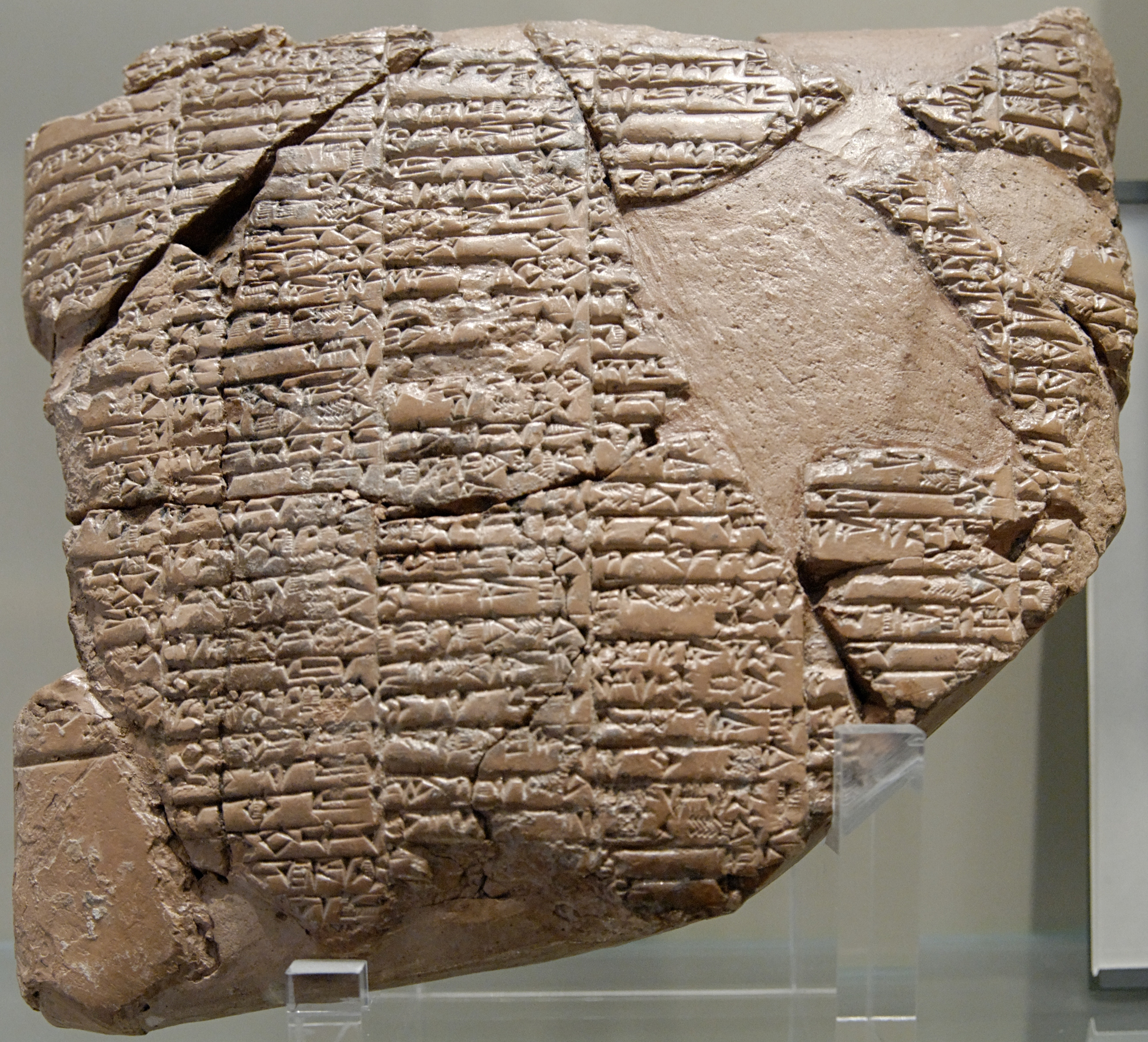
Tablet recording the alliance between Naram-Sin and an Elamite king, c. 2250 BC, Susa, Louvre Museum.

Beyond Lower Mesopotamia, Akkadian domination did not take the form of annexations of vast tracts of territory constituting a zone of continuous control. It took various forms depending on the time and place: it relied on the establishment of a network of garrisons in several conquered cities located at strategic points, which ensured direct control over these territories, while elsewhere diplomatic alliances (in some cases including marriage alliances) with local rulers were favored. This may reflect the fact that the military campaigns were also (and above all?) aimed at controlling trade routes for goods prized by the empire’s elites, while leaving vast swaths of territory outside their direct control.

The region of Susa has been under Akkadian influence since the time of Sargon. It may have been administered by the Akkadian government as early as that period, but there is no definitive evidence of direct rule prior to the end of Naram-Sin’s reign and the early part of Shar-kali-sharri’s reign. Archives from this period document the activities of the Akkadian administration based in Susa, which headed an enclave known as Dur-Agade, “Fort Akkad.” Susa was also the site of the discovery of a tablet containing an oath sworn by an Elamite king of unknown identity (Hita of Awan?) to Naram-Sin. It is, in a sense, one of the oldest international treaties whose provisions are known in writing. Written in an archaic form of Elamite language that is poorly understood, its content is difficult to interpret. It is generally believed that the two kings were allies and on a relatively equal footing, but it is possible that the Elamite king was in a vassal position.

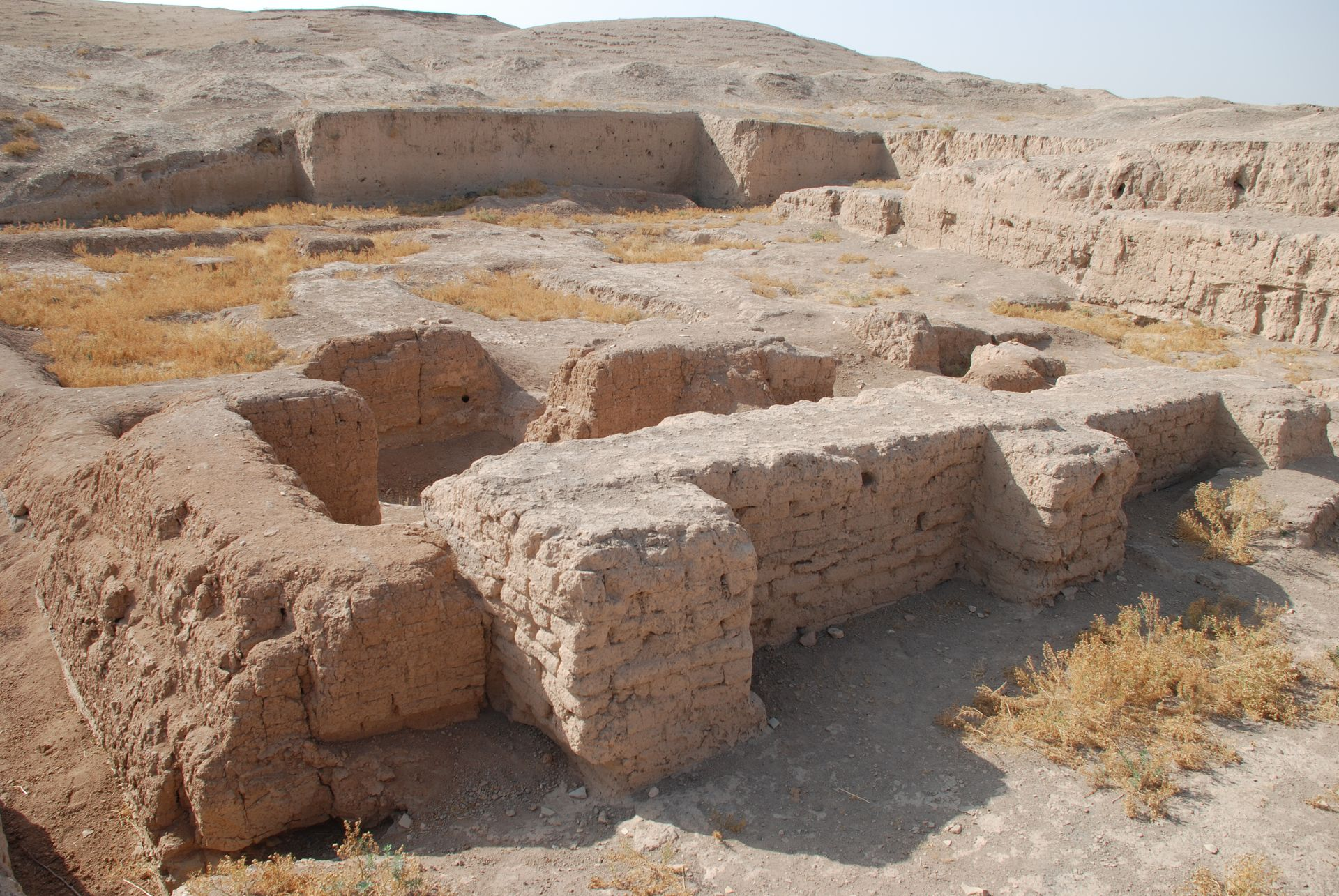
Ruins of a structure from the reign of Naram-Sin at Tell Brak.

Akkadian presence has also been identified at several sites in the Khabur region, in northwestern Mesopotamia. Tell Brak, ancient Nagar (capital of a powerful kingdom prior to the Akkadian period), became a fortified Akkadian administrative center during the reign of Naram-Sin, yielding several archival documents. This city may therefore have served as a bridgehead for Akkadian domination over the surrounding region. As for neighboring sites, Akkadian domination seems to have been at best indirect. Tell Mozan, ancient Urkesh, might have been an ally, if its king did indeed marry a daughter of Naram-Sin (see above). In any case, the city seems to have remained independent. Evidence of an Akkadian presence at Tell Leilan, ancient Shekhna, is limited and debated.

== Assessment and Aftermath ==
Naram-Sin’s achievements can first be assessed by comparing them with those of his immediate predecessors and with the political framework he inherited at the beginning of his reign. For many, it was certainly an unprecedented power, but at this stage it was still an empire in the making, whose dominance was contested in Lower Mesopotamia, and whose outward expansion lacked clear guidelines and structures. Naram-Sin changed this situation through his impressive conquests and reforms.

His reign also marked a turning point with the establishment of an 'imperial' style of rule. According to P. Michalowski, "there are signs in the wording of his inscriptions that this monarch had a complex relationship with his dynastic origins, eager to distinguish himself by redoing more perfectly all that had been done before and to reach out much further in the fulfillment of cosmocratic dreams. Under his regime, Akkad became an empire." The main elements highlighted by historians to argue that the kings of Akkad—and Naram-Sin in particular—were indeed the rulers of an "empire" are: the military foundation of the state’s power and expansion, combined with an increasingly well-organized administrative apparatus; changes in norms, particularly in writing; the development of innovative art and discourse centered on the promotion of kingship and its dominance, and, ultimately, the fact that the Akkadian Empire marked a turning point, establishing a model for a multi-ethnic state with universal aspirations for the future.

While it is very difficult, if not impossible, to gain insight into his personality, it is clear that Naram-Sin was a highly divisive figure, undoubtedly hated by many, particularly in Sumer, which explains his rather negative image in the Sumerian tradition as reflected in the Curse of Akkad. This often negative assessment may have been the consequence of the significant changes he imposed on Lower Mesopotamia.

Another way to assess Naram-Sin’s reign is to look at what happened afterward. His son Shar-kali-sharri succeeded him, and the abundant administrative records from Lower Mesopotamia seem to indicate that the early part of his reign was marked by prosperity, or at the very least that the administration continued to function well. Nevertheless, Akkadian influence abroad began to wane. Due to a lack of sources, it is unknown when or how the Akkadian Empire disappeared, but it appears that as early as the end of Shar-kali-sharri’s reign, the situation became difficult, with incursions by peoples from outside, the Amorites and the Gutians, which gradually led to a drastic reduction in the size of the kingdom. There were clearly successors to Shar-kali-sharri on the throne of Akkad, but they ruled only over a reduced territory, and there is no clear evidence that they were part of the dynasty of Sargon and Naram-Sin.

Beyond these external causes, the reasons for the ultimate failure of the Akkadian Empire were undoubtedly structural. At this stage, the empire was not a structure based on extensive political and economic integration. Its external dominance was often nominal at best, which explains the speed with which it lost control. Naram-Sin was already facing the Amorites, who returned during his son’s reign to successfully undermine Akkadian authority in Upper Mesopotamia.

== Posterity and Reception ==
After his death, Naram-Sin remained a major figure in the Mesopotamian historical tradition. He shares this posthumous legacy with his grandfather Sargon. In the collective memory of ancient Mesopotamia, the two form a duo that is in many ways polar opposites: while the founder of the empire is remembered as the archetype of the great conqueror, Naram-Sin presents a more ambivalent image, that of a ruler who was certainly unmatched in power and wealth, but whose pride and excesses precipitated the fall of Akkad.

=== Self-proclaimed heirs of Naram-Sin ===
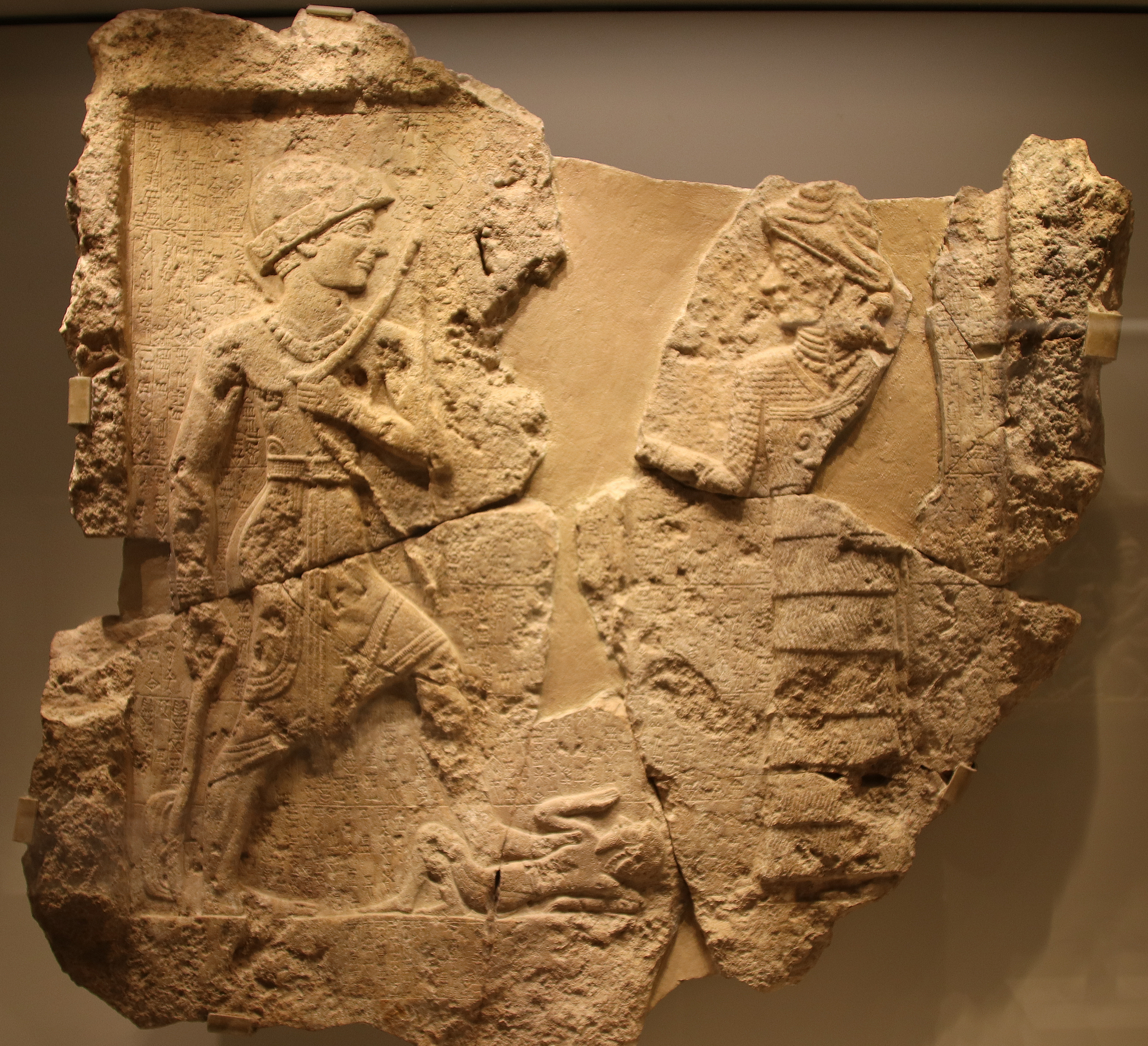
Relief of King Iddin-Sin of Simurrum, mimicking the pose on Naram-Sin’s stele. Israel Museum.

From the time of the fall of the Akkadian Empire or shortly thereafter, the Gutian kings who managed to carve out a kingdom for themselves in Mesopotamia imitated Naram-Sin in their inscriptions, while a king of the Lullubi—the people whose defeat is commemorated by the Victory Stele—had himself depicted on a rock relief in the same manner as Naram-Sin on the stele. The fascination exerted by the Akkadian king was thus evident shortly after his death.

Subsequently, Naram-Sin, like the other kings of Akkad, was incorporated into ancestral cults that made funerary offerings (kispum) to him. This is attested as early as the era of the Third Dynasty of Ur (21st century BC) and during the Old Babylonian period, at the beginning of the 18th century BC in Mari, while the latter was ruled by the dynasty of Samsi-Addu, who claimed descent from the kings of Akkad.

In the 19th century BC, two Mesopotamian kings bore the name Naram-Sin. The first, Naram-Sin of Eshnunna, reigned from a city located near Akkad, which sought to establish itself as a continuation of Akkad’s legacy. Several literary works from this period featuring Naram-Sin as the protagonist, such as the Elegy of Naram-Sin, likely originated in this kingdom. Another king named Naram-Sin reigned from Assur (a city where a king named Sargon is also attested shortly before him), as well as Naram-Sin of Uruk.

The Babylonian king Nabonidus (559–539 BC), who had a keen interest in antiquities and sought to collect ancient artifacts, took a keen interest in the Akkadian dynasty. He restored two temples that Naram-Sin had built long before him: the temple of Shamash in Sippar and the temple of Ishtar in Akkad. He sought to uncover their foundations in order to follow their original plans. This king also consecrated one of his daughters as high priestess of the god Sin in Ur, perhaps to follow in the footsteps of Sargon and Naram-Sin, who had done the same in their time.

=== Ancient scholarly traditions ===
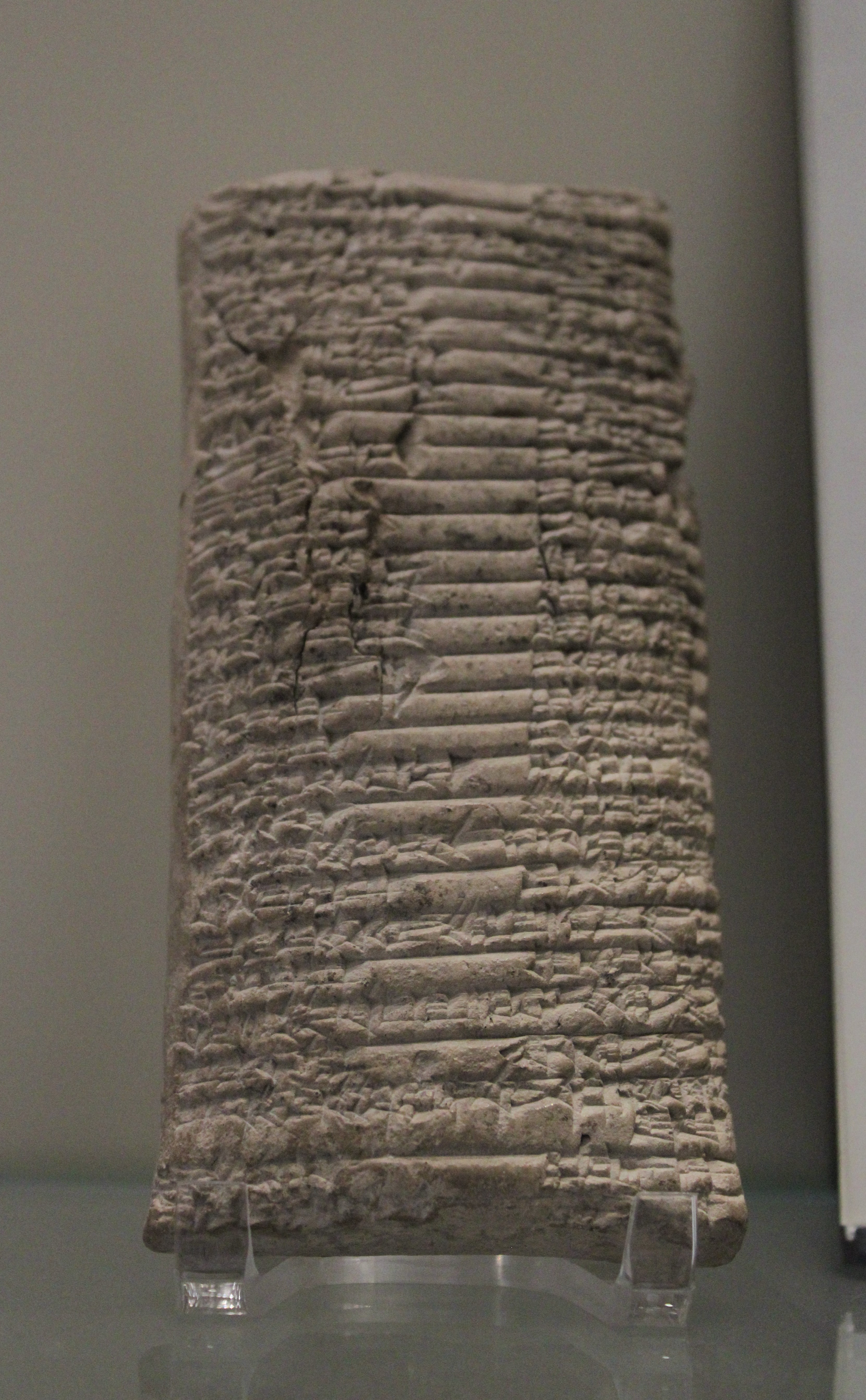
Copy of the Curse of Akkad, early 2nd millennium BC. Louvre Museum.

The impact of Naram-Sin’s reign is measured above all by the extensive literary tradition surrounding him. It is here that his negative image takes shape, in texts that are certainly based in part on events that occurred during his reign or that of his successors (he is often presented erroneously as the last king of Akkad), but which have been reinterpreted in light of the concerns of their authors and their audience to impart lessons in history. These texts seem to have been originally based on knowledge of Naram-Sin’s inscriptions, but were freely and creatively manipulated, with the addition of exaggerations and fantastical elements.

The most widely known account of him is the Curse of Akkad (or Curse of Agade), a narrative in Sumerian language from the late 3rd millennium BC. It consists of 280 lines and has been preserved in its entirety, thanks to its numerous copies: among texts in this language, only the myth Lugal-e seems to have surpassed it in popularity. It is a historical fiction weaving a narrative of decline around the reconstruction of the temple of Enlil in Nippur by Naram-Sin and the fall of that empire, suggesting that the text was composed within the scholarly circles of that sanctuary, perhaps serving as a warning to the kings of the Third Dynasty of Ur should they neglect it. It draws on the 'philosophy of history' from the late 3rd and early 2nd millennia BC, most clearly articulated in the Sumerian King List: the gods successively bestow their favor upon several dynasties, with only one exercising kingship at a time. It is a highly sophisticated narrative, in which Naram-Sin becomes a tragic figure. It explains how Enlil, after having given his favor upon the kings of Akkad and allowed Naram-Sin to rule a prosperous kingdom, subsequently stripped him of his kingship. The reason for this reversal is not explained, any more than it is in the Sumerian King List. Receiving in a dream an omen of his empire’s doom, Naram-Sin becomes prostrate and inactive for seven years, then has omens performed in order to receive a sign that he must restore Enlil’s temple at Nippur and thus regain his favor. Since he received no favorable response, he decided to destroy the temple. In retaliation, Enlil unleashed 'barbarian' hordes against him, embodied in the narrative by the Gutians.

That the kingship of Agade would no longer abide and prosper,
That its outlook held nothing positive to view,
That its household would quake, that its stores be scattered,
Naram-Sin saw it in a dream.
He knew what it meant, he found no words for it, nor could he
talk of it with anyone. (...)
Seeking to change what had been vouchsafed him,
He tried to change what Enlil had commanded,
He threw out the findings compiled for him.
Like a boxer striding into the great courtyard,
He clenched his fist at Ekur.
Like a wrestler crouching to start a match,
He acted as if the god’s dwelling was a lightweight.

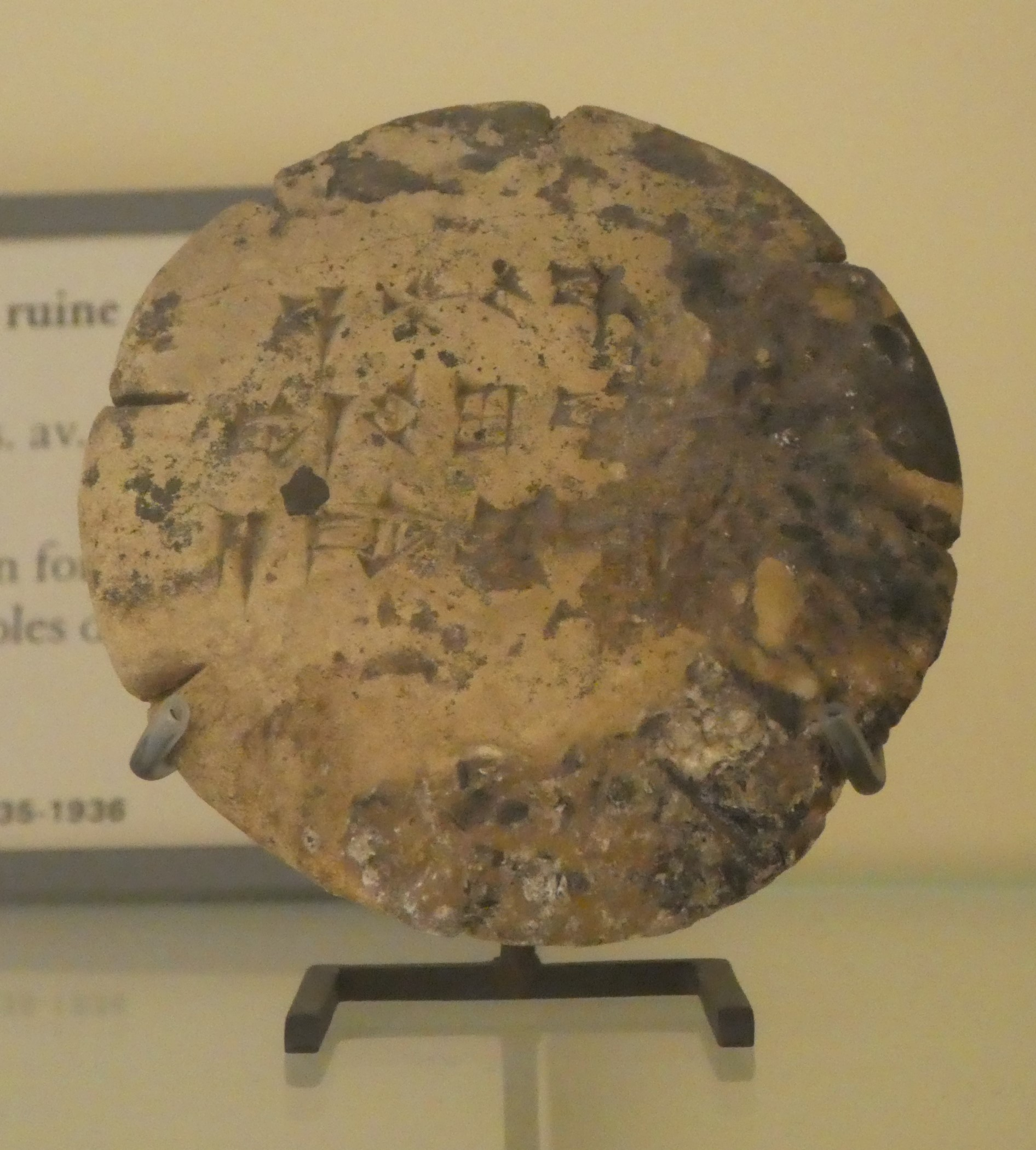
Tablet recording an “omen of the fall of Akkad,” following a hepatoscopy consultation in Mari, early 18th century BC Louvre Museum.

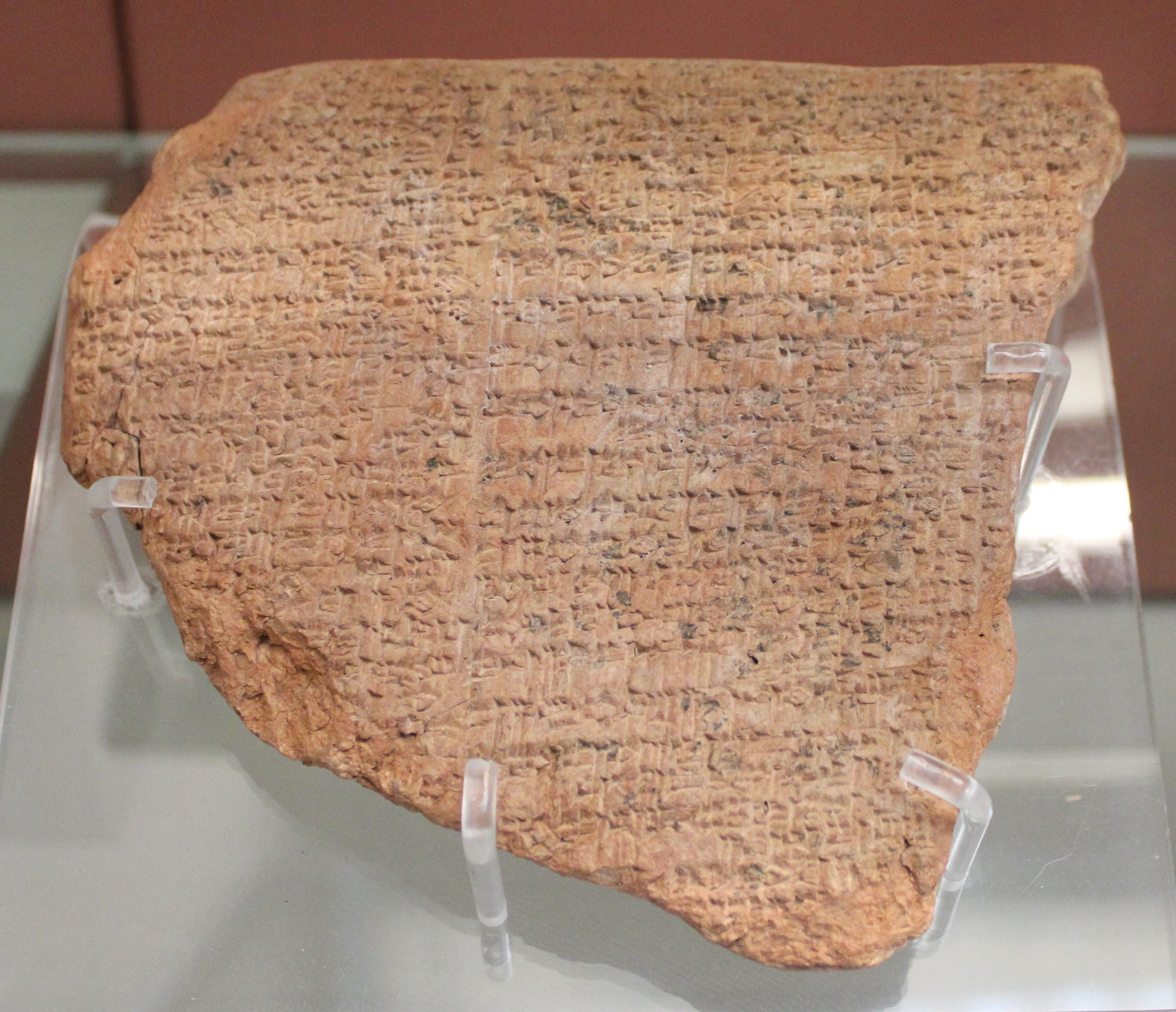
Account of Naram-Sin’s capture of Apishal, early 2nd millennium BC. British Museum.

Naram-Sin is a major figure in the so-called “historical” omens composed from the early 2nd millennoium BC onward. These are documents related to the practice of divination by reading the entrails of lambs (hepatoscopy and extispicy)—short texts such as, for example, “the omen of Naram-Sin, who seized Apishal.” Around the middle of the 2nd millennium BC, these omens were compiled into series on longer tablets, and then again in the 7th century BC in Assyria. Their historical reliability is questionable.

A literary text recounts this same siege of Apishal, whose historical reality is disputed. In it, Naram-Sin emerges victorious but ultimately shows magnanimity toward the defeated king, who is restored to his throne. A group of texts deals with the Great Revolt, and appear to be based in part on the king’s inscriptions recounting this event.

The most elaborate of the Akkadian texts about this king that has survived is the Cuthean Legend of Naram-Sin (or Naram-Sin and the Enemy Hordes), composed toward the end of the Old Babylonian period (17th century BC?) and reworked at the beginning of the 1st millennium BC. In it, Naram-Sin initially appears as a self-important ruler. He faces a revolt by seven demonic foreign rulers who are ravaging his kingdom. The omens he had interpreted foretold nothing favorable, but he sent his troops anyway, only to have them cut to pieces by his enemies. He finally received an omen telling him not to attack his enemies, who had been sent by the gods to punish him for his hubris. Naram-Sin then undergoes a change of heart and has the account of his misfortunes inscribed on a stele, urging those who read it in the future to ensure the prosperity and stability of their kingdoms rather than wage war.

Let your foundations be firm!
You, within the embrace of your wife, do your work!
Strengthen your walls!
Fill your moats with water!
Your chests, your grain, your money, your goods, your possessions,
bring into your stronghold!
Tie up your weapons and put (them) into the corners!
Guard your courage! Take heed of your own person!
Let him roam through your land! Go not out to him!
Let him scatter the cattle! Do not go near him!
Let him consume the flesh of your offspring!
Let him murder, (and) let him return (unharmed)!
(But) you be self-controlled, disciplined.
Answer them, "Here I am, sir"!
Requite their wickedness with kindness!

=== In modern popular culture ===
King Naram-Sin is a character in the 2021 video game House of Ashes, with the main plot occurring in his personal temple. In the game, he is the self-proclaimed "God King" of Akkad, and is engaged in a war with the Gutians after being cursed by the god Enlil; whom he angered after the sacking of his temple. Naram-Sin was voiced and motion captured by Sami Karim.

In the 2021 mobile gacha game Blue Archive, Volume F, the innermost chamber of the large floating quantum supercomputer known as the "Ark of Atra-Hasis" (itself a reference to the Akkadian myth) is named "Throne of Naram-Sin".

== See also ==
- List of kings of Akkad
- List of Mesopotamian dynasties
- History of Mesopotamia
- Sumerian king list
- House of Ashes

== Bibliography ==
- Bahrani, Zainab (2017). Mesopotamia: Ancient Art and Architecture. London: Thames & Hudson.
- Foster, Benjamin R. (2016). The Age of Agade: Inventing empire in ancient Mesopotamia. Londres and New York: Routledge / Taylor & Francis Group.
- Frayne, Douglas (1993). The Sargonic and Gutian Periods (2334–2113). Toronto: University of Toronto Press.
- Frayne, Douglas (1999). "Narām-Sîn A.". Reallexikon der Assyriologie und Vorderasiatischen Archäologie. Vol. IX. pp. 169–174.
- Lafont, Bertrand (2017). "Akkad, l'empire charismatique (2330-2100)". Mésopotamie: De Gilgamesh à Artaban (3300-120 av. J.-C.). Mondes anciens (in French). Paris: Belin. pp. 165–199.
- Liverani, Mario (2014). "The Akkadian empire". The Ancient Near East: History, Society and Economy. London: Routledge. pp. 133–153.
- Michalowski, Piotr (2011). "Early Mesopotamia". In Feldherr, Andrew; Hard, Grant (ed.). The Oxford History of Historical Writing: Volume 1: Beginnings to AD 600. Oxford: Oxford University Press. pp. 5–28.
- Michalowski, Piotr (2020). "The Kingdom of Akkad in Contact with the World". In Karen Radner, Nadine Moeller and Daniel T. Potts (ed.). The Oxford History of the Ancient Near East, Volume I: From the Beginnings to Old Kingdom Egypt and the Dynasty of Akkad. New York: Oxford University Press. pp. 686–764.
- Sallaberger, Walther; Schrakamp, Ingo (2015). "Philological Data for a Historical Chronology of Mesopotamia in the 3rd Millennium". In Walther Sallaberger and Ingo Schrakamp (ed.). Associated Regional Chronologies for the Ancient Near East and the Eastern Mediterranean. Vol III: History & Philology. Turnhout: Brepols. pp. 1–136.
- Schrakamp, Ingo (2020). "The Kingdom of Akkad: A View from Within". In Karen Radner, Nadine Moeller and Daniel T. Potts (ed.). The Oxford History of the Ancient Near East, Volume I: From the Beginnings to Old Kingdom Egypt and the Dynasty of Akkad. New York: Oxford University Press. pp. 612–685.
- Steinkeller, Piotr (2017). History, Texts and Art in Early Babylonia. Berlin and Boston: De Gruyter.
- Steinkeller, Piotr (2021). "The Sargonic and Ur III Empires". In Peter Fibiger Bang, C.A. Bayly and Walter Scheidel (ed.). The Oxford World History of Empire. Oxford: Oxford University Press. pp. 43–72.
- Westenholz, Aage (1999). "The Old Akkadian Period: History and Culture". Mesopotamien: Akkade-Zeit und Ur III-Zeit. Orbis Biblicus et Orientalis. Freiburg and Göttingen: Universitätsverlag Freiburg Schweiz and Vandenhoeck & Ruprecht. pp. 17–118.
- Westenholz, Joan Goodnick (1997). Legends of the Kings of Akkade. Winona Lake: Eisenbrauns.

=== Further reading ===
- Al-Hussainy, Abbas Ali Abbas, "The civilized achievements of the Akkadian king Naram-Sin A Research in his Artistic Remains and The Date Formulas", ISIN Journal 3, 2022
- Boissier, Alfred, "Inscription de Naram-Sin", Revue d’Assyriologie et d’archéologie Orientale, vol. 16, no. 3, pp. 157–64, 1919
- Foster, B. R., "Naram-Sin in Martu and Magan", ARRIM 8, pp. 25–44, 1990
- Glassner, J. J., "Naram-Sîn Poliorcète. Les avatars d'une sentence divinatoire", Revue d’Assyriologie et d’archéologie Orientale, vol. 77, no. 1, pp. 3–10, 1983
- Grayson, A. Kirk, and Edmond Sollberger, "L’insurrection générale contre Narām-Suen", RA70, pp. 103–128, 1976
- Lafont, Bertrand, "Une plaque en argile portant une inscription de Naram-Sin d'Agadé", The Third Millennium. Studies in Early Mesopotamia and Syria in Honor of Walter Sommerfeld and Manfred Krebernik, hrsg. v. Arkhipov, Ilya, Kogan, Leonid, Koslova, Natalia (Cuneiform Monographs 50), pp. 408–416, 2020
- Piotr Michalowski, "New Sources concerning the Reign of Naram-Sin", Journal of Cuneiform Studies, vol. 32, no. 4, pp. 233–246, (Oct., 1980)
- Nassouhi, Essad, "Un vase en albatre de Naram - Sin", Revue d’Assyriologie et d’archéologie Orientale, vol. 22, no. 2, pp. 91–91, 1925
- A. Poebel, "The ‘Schachtelsatz’ Construction of the Naram-Sîn Text RA XVI 157f.", Miscellaneous Studies, AS 14; Chicago, pp.23–42, 1947
- Powell, Marvin A., "Narām-Sîn, Son of Sargon: Ancient History, Famous Names, and a Famous Babylonian Forgery", Zeitschrift für Assyriologie und Vorderasiatische Archäologie, vol. 81, no. 1-2, pp. 20–30, 1991
- Salgues, E., "Naram-Sin's conquests of Subartu and Armanum", Akkade is King. A collection of papers by friends and colleagues presented to Aage Westenholz on the occasion of his 70th birthday 15 May 2009, hrsg. v. Gojko Barjamovic (Uitgaven van het Nederlands Instituut voor het Nabije Oosten te Leiden 118), pp. 253–272, 2011
- Steinkeller, Piotr, "The Roundlet of Naram-Suen", History, Texts and Art in Early Babylonia: Three Essays, Berlin, Boston: De Gruyter, pp. 158–164, 2017
- F.Thureau-Dangin, Une inscription de Naram-Sin", Revue d’Assyriologie et d’archéologie Orientale, vol. 8, no. 4, pp. 199–200, 1911

Regnal titles
Preceded by Manishtushu	King of Akkad; King of Kish, Uruk, Lagash, and Umma; Overlord of Elam c. 2255 – c. 2218 BC	Succeeded by Shar-Kali-Sharri
