= Erridupizir =

Gutian king

King of Gutian Dynasty
- Reign: c. 2205-2202 BC (MC)
- Successor: Imta

Erridupizir (Erridu-pizir) c. 2205-2202 BC (MC) was a Gutian ruler in Sumer. His reign was attested by a royal inscription at the archaeological site for the ancient city-state of Nippur where he called himself: "King of Guti, King of the Four Quarters" Thought to be the "king without a name" on the SKL. Imta then succeeded Erridupizir.

After the Akkadian Empire fell to the Gutians, the Lullubians rebelled against Erridupizir, according to the latter's inscriptions:

Ka-Nisba, king of Simurrum, instigated the people of Simurrum and Lullubi to revolt. Amnili, general of [the enemy Lullubi]... made the land [rebel]... Erridu-pizir, the mighty, king of Gutium and of the four quarters hastened [to confront] him... In a single day he captured the pass of Urbillum at Mount Mummum. Further, he captured Nirishuha.

— Inscription R2:226-7 of Erridupizir.

In another inscription he said "the goddess Aštar had stationed troops in Agade".

In an Old Babylonian copy, found in Nippur, of an earlier inscription from a monument dedicated by Erridupizir to the god Enlil in Nippur it read "... Erridu-(pi]zir, the migh[ty], king of Gutium and the four quarters took (him, i. e. his opponent, the ruler of Magda) away by force through the gate of the god of Gutium, struck him, and killed him, the king (of Magda). Thus (says) Erridu-pizir, the mighty, king of Gutium [and] of the [f] our [qua]rters: >At that day I fashioned a statue of myself and placed my foot at his neck ...". The colophon read "inscribed tablet: 3 statues of Erridu-pizir".

== See also ==
- Chronology of the ancient Near East
- List of Mesopotamian dynasties

Preceded by unknown	King of Guti, King of the Four Quarters fl. late 3rd millennium BC	Succeeded by Imta
