= Imta =

Imta or Nibia
- King of Sumer
- Reign: fl. late 3rd millennium BCE
- Predecessor: Erridupizir
- Successor: Inkishush

Imta or Nibia (fl. late 3rd millennium BCE) was a Gutian ruler in Sumer. He was the successor of Erridupizir. Imta was then succeeded by Inkishush.

Preceded by Erridupizir	King of Sumer fl. late 3rd millennium BC	Succeeded by Inkishush

== See also ==
- History of Sumer
- List of Mesopotamian dynasties
