= Igeshaush =

- King of Sumer
- Reign: fl. late 3rd millennium BCE
- Predecessor: Inimabakesh
- Successor: Yarlagab
- House: Gutian Dynasty of Sumer

Igeshaush (fl. late 3rd millennium BCE) was the 6th Gutian ruler of the Gutian Dynasty of Sumer mentioned on the "Sumerian King List" (SKL). Igeshaush was the successor of Inimabakesh. Yarlagab then succeeded Igeshaush.

Preceded by Inimabakesh	King of Sumer fl. late 3rd millennium BCE	Succeeded by Yarlagab

== See also ==
- History of Sumer
- List of Mesopotamian dynasties
