= Elulmesh =

- King of Sumer
- Reign: fl. late 3rd millennium BCE
- Predecessor: Shulme
- Successor: Inimabakesh
- House: Gutian Dynasty of Sumer

Elulmesh (fl. late 3rd millennium BCE) was the fourth Gutian ruler of the Gutian Dynasty of Sumer mentioned on the Sumerian King List. While there is virtually no surviving evidence dating from this short timespan (thought to correspond with the first Gutian inroads into Akkadian territory), it has been suggested that this Elulmesh is to be identified as the same as the Akkadian king Ilulu, also known from the King List. Elulmesh was the successor of Shulme. Inimabakesh then succeeded Elulmesh.

Preceded by Shulme	King of Sumer fl. late 3rd millennium BCE	Succeeded by Inimabakesh

== See also ==
- History of Sumer
- List of Mesopotamian dynasties
