= Meshkiangasher =

Sumerian ruler priest of Inanna

Meshkiangasher 𒈩𒆠𒉘𒂵𒊺𒅕
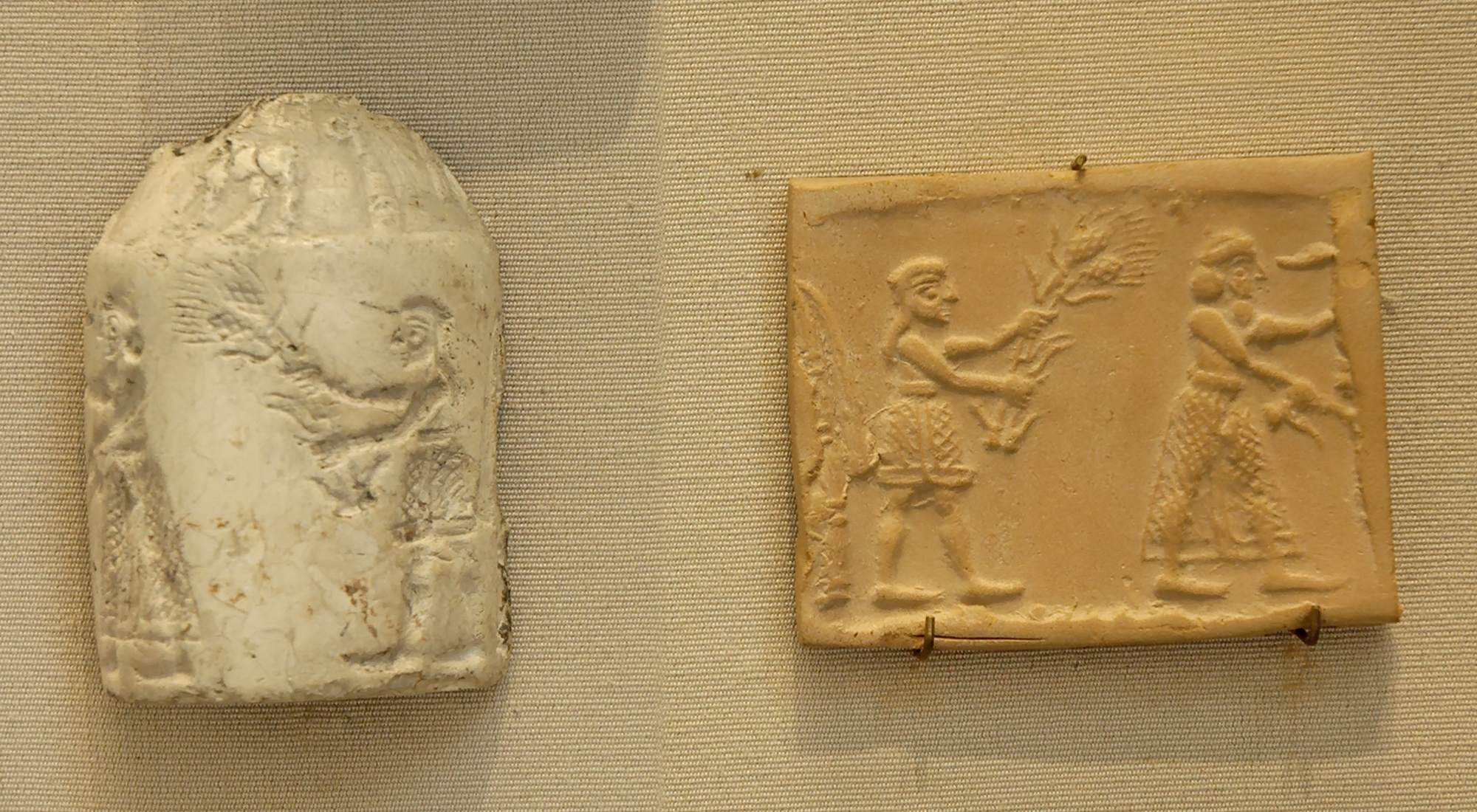
- Cylinder seal depicting the king-priest and his acolyte feeding the sacred herd. Uruk period, c. 3200 BC.
- First appearance: Sumerian King List c. 2000 BC

In-universe information
- Occupation: King of Uruk (reigned c. 324 years)
- Family: Utu (father)
- Children: Enmerkar

Meshkiangasher (Note: Lit. "Meski'ağ, he is mighty".) (Note: Sumerian: 𒈩𒆠𒉘𒂵𒊺𒅕 Meškiağašer) was a legendary king mentioned in the Sumerian King List as the priest of the Eanna temple in Uruk, whose journey led him to the enter the sea and ascend the mountains.

== Mythology ==
The King list mentions Meshkiangasher as a descendant of the sun god Utu, who became the high priest of Inanna in the Eanna temple reigning for 324 years, (Note: P2 has 325, however, the sum of the reigns given to Uruk restores it as 324.) and conceived his son and successor to the throne Enmerkar. His epithet concludes with his descent to the sea and ascent to the mountains, a journey which has been compared to the trajectory of the Sun, believed by the Sumerians that made the exact travel and suitable for the "son of the sun-god".

== Possible fabrication ==
Unlike his successors, Meshkiangasher is not found in any poem or hymn besides the King list. His reign has long been suspected to be a fabrication during the Ur III period due to the Sumerian-Akkadian hybrid structure of his name, the element MES, which occurs in historical royal names of Ur, and the tradition about his disappearance. The fabrication of king Meshkiangasher could be an arrangement to separate the god Utu from being the biological father of Enmerkar, as mentioned in Enmerkar and the Lord of Aratta, and giving him a royal descendant instead.

== See also ==
- List of people who disappeared mysteriously at sea

== Notes ==
Regnal titles
Preceded by First dynasty of Kish	Sumerian ruler En of Uruk legendary	Succeeded by Enmerkar
