= Udul-kalama =

Sumerian ruler

Udul-kalama 𒌋𒊨𒌦𒈠

King of Uruk
- Reign: c. 2620 – c. 2635 BC
- Died: c. 2635 BC

Udul-kalama (died c. 2635 BC) was the seventh Sumerian ruler in the First Dynasty of Uruk, according to the Sumerian King List. He may have been a son of Ur-Nungal and grandson of Gilgamesh. However, unlike his predecessors, he left no other known documents or relics mentioning his name, and he may have been one of several minor kings of Uruk added to the list, who reigned when hegemony was actually held by the first dynasty of Ur.

Regnal titles
Preceded by Possibly Ur-Nungal	King of Sumer c. 26th century BC	Succeeded by Possibly La-ba'shum
Preceded by Possibly Ur-Nungal	Ensi of Uruk c. 2620 – c. 2605 BC	Succeeded by Possibly La-ba'shum
