= Dadasig =

- First appearance: Sumerian King List c. 2000 BC

In-universe information
- Occupation: King of Kish (reigned c. 81 years)

Dadasig appears as the second king of the second dynasty of Kish in some versions of the Sumerian King List. According to that literary composition, Dadasig ruled for 81 years. The kings on the early part of the SKL are usually not considered historical, except when they are mentioned in contemporary documents. Dadasig is not one of them.
