= Lugal-kitun =

Sumerian king

Lugal-kitun 𒈗𒆠𒂅

King of Uruk
- Reign: c. 2546 – c. 2510 BC
- Died: c. 2510 BC

Lugal-kitun (Sumerian: 𒈗𒆠𒂅, lugal-ki-tun₃; (died c. 2510 BC) was the 12th and last lugal of the first Dynasty of Uruk. He ruled in Mesopotamia in what is now Iraq. Little is known about Lugal-kitun.

According to the Sumerian King List, he reigned for 36 years. Lugal-kitun was overthrown by Mesannepada of Ur, ending the First Dynasty of Uruk and founding the First Dynasty of Ur.

== See also ==
- History of Sumer

Regnal titles
Preceded by Possibly Melem-ana	King of Uruk c. 2546 – c. 2510 BC	Succeeded by Possibly Mesannepada
