= Ur-Nungal =

Sumerian ruler

Ur-Nungal 𒌨𒀭𒉣𒃲

King of Uruk
- Reign: c. 2650 – c. 2620 BC
- Died: c. 2620 BC

Ur-Nungal (died c. 2620 BC) was the sixth Sumerian ruler in the First Dynasty of Uruk, according to the Sumerian King List, which also claims he ruled 30 years. Both the Sumerian King List and the Tummal Chronicle state he was the son of Gilgamesh ( GIL-GA-MEŠ ), but only the Sumerian King List records he was the father of Udul-kalamma who ruled after him for 15 years within the same dynasty .

Regnal titles
Preceded by Possibly Gilgamesh	King of Sumer c. 26th century BC	Succeeded by Possibly Udul-kalama
Preceded by Possibly Gilgamesh	Ensi of Uruk c. 2650 – c. 2620 BC	Succeeded by Possibly Udul-kalama
