= Inkishush =

Inkishush or Inkišuš
- King of Sumer
- Reign: Fl. late 3rd millennium BC
- Predecessor: Imta
- Successor: Sarlagab
- House: Gutian Dynasty of Sumer

Inkishush or Inkišuš (fl. late 3rd millennium BC) was the first Gutian ruler of the Gutian Dynasty mentioned on the Sumerian King List. According to this list, he was the successor of Imta. Sarlagab then succeeded Inkishush.

He would have been contemporary with the Akkadian kings Naram-Sin (r. 2254-2218 BC) and Shar-Kali-Sharri (r. 2217-2193 BC).

Preceded by Imta	King of Sumer; Fl. late 3rd millennium BC	Succeeded by Sarlagab

== See also ==
- History of Sumer
- List of Mesopotamian dynasties
