= Melem-ana =

Ancient Sumerian ruler

Melem-ana 𒈨𒉈𒀭𒈾

King of Uruk
- Reign: c. 2552 – c. 2546 BC
- Died: c. 2546 BC

Melem-Ana of Unug (died c. 2546 BC) was the 11th lugal of the First Dynasty of Uruk. He ruled in Mesopotamia in what is now Iraq. Little is known about Melem-ana.

The Sumerian King List places him after Mesh-he and he would have ruled for 6 years. It is believed he died around the year 2546 BC. Whether Lugal-kitun succeeded him, however, is not completely established.

== See also ==
- History of Sumer

Regnal titles
Preceded by Possibly Mesh-he	King of Uruk c. 2552 – c. 2546 BC	Succeeded by Possibly Lugal-kitun
