= Scheil dynastic tablet =

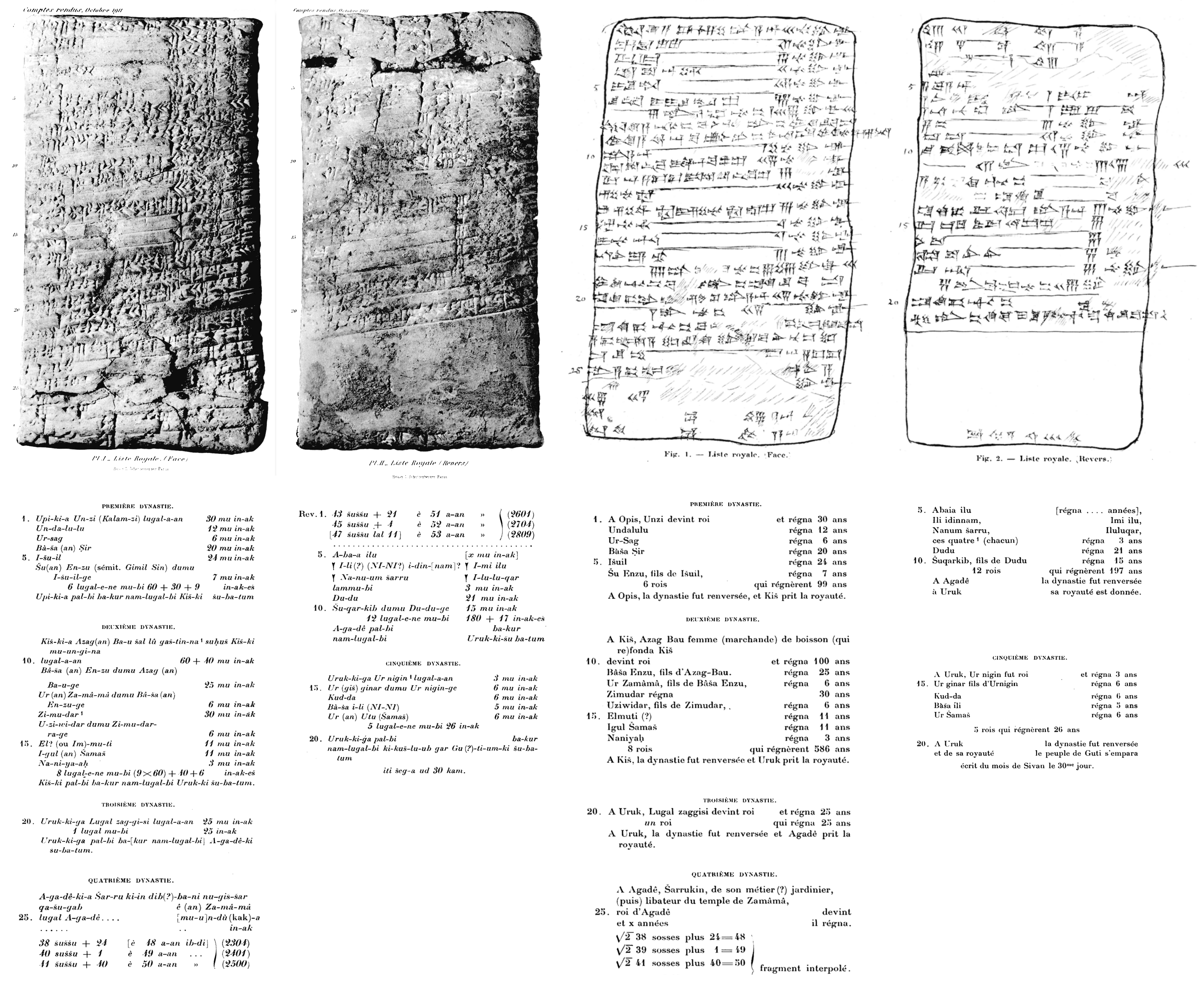
The Scheil dynastic tablet, with transcription and translation in French (1911).

The Scheil dynastic tablet is an ancient Mesopotamian cuneiform text containing a variant form of the Sumerian King List.

== Discovery ==
The tablet came into possession of the Assyriologist Jean-Vincent Scheil in 1911, having bought it from a private collection in France. The tablet when purchased was reported to have been unearthed from Susa. Scheil translated the tablet in 1911. The tablet dates to the early 2nd millennium BC.

He obtained another document, a rather damaged prism similar to the Weld-Blundell Prism, which he translated in 1934, and completed using information from the 1911 tablet and other known documents.

The 1911 tablet is currently owned by the British Museum, but is not on display.
