= La-ba'shum =

La-ba'shum 𒆷𒁀𒀪𒋳

King of Uruk
- Reign: c. 2605 – c. 2596 BC
- Died: c. 2596 BC

La-ba'shum (died c. 2596 BC) was the eighth Sumerian ruler in the First Dynasty of Uruk, according to the Sumerian King List. He was described as ruling for nine years.

Regnal titles
Preceded by Possibly Udul-kalama	King of Sumer ca. 26th century BC	Succeeded by Possibly En-nun-tarah-ana
Preceded by Possibly Udul-kalama	Ensi of Uruk c. 2605 – c. 2596 BC	Succeeded by Possibly En-nun-tarah-ana
