= Inimabakesh =

- King of Sumer
- Reign: fl. late 3rd millennium BCE
- Predecessor: Elulmesh
- Successor: Igeshaush
- House: Gutian Dynasty of Sumer

Inimabakesh (fl. late 3rd millennium BCE) was the fifth Gutian ruler of the Gutian Dynasty of Sumer mentioned on the Sumerian King List. Inimabakesh was the successor of Elulmesh. Igeshaush then succeeded Inimabakesh.

Preceded by Elulmesh	King of Sumer fl. late 3rd millennium BCE	Succeeded by Igeshaush

== See also ==
- History of Sumer
- List of Mesopotamian dynasties
