= Yarlagab =

- King of Sumer
- Reign: fl. late 3rd millennium BCE
- Predecessor: Igeshaush
- Successor: Ibate
- House: Gutian Dynasty of Sumer

Yarlagab (fl. late 3rd millennium BCE) was the 7th Gutian ruler of the Gutian Dynasty of Sumer mentioned on the "Sumerian King List" (SKL). According to the SKL: Yarlagab was the successor of Igeshaush. Ibate then succeeded Yarlagab, likewise according to the SKL.

Preceded by Igeshaush	King of Sumer fl. late 3rd millennium BC	Succeeded by Ibate

== See also ==
- History of Sumer
- List of Mesopotamian dynasties
