= Mesh-he =

Lugal of first dynasty of Uruk

Mesh-He

King of Uruk
- Reign: c. 2588 – c. 2552 BC
- Died: c. 2552 BC

Mesh-He (died c. 2552 BC), described as "the smith", is the 10th lugal of the first dynasty of Uruk. He ruled in modern-day Iraq. Little is known about Mesh-he.

The Sumerian King List puts him after En-Nun-Tarah-Ana and assigns 36 years of reign, it is believed he died by the year 2552 BC. He was followed by Melem-ana.

His historicity, and that of his successors, however, is not completely established.

Regnal titles
Preceded by Possibly En-nun-tarah-ana	King of Sumer ca. 26th century BC	Succeeded by Possibly Melem-ana
Preceded by Possibly En-nun-tarah-ana	Ensi of Uruk c. 2588 – c. 2552 BC	Succeeded by Possibly Melem-ana
