= Shulme =

- King of Sumer
- Reign: fl. late 3rd millennium BC
- Predecessor: Sarlagab
- Successor: Elulmesh
- House: Gutian Dynasty of Sumer

Shulme (fl. late 3rd millennium BC) was the third Gutian ruler of the Gutian Dynasty of Sumer mentioned on the Sumerian King List. According to the list, he was the successor of Sarlagab. Elulmesh then succeeded Shulme.

Preceded by Sarlagab	King of Sumer fl. late 3rd millennium BC	Succeeded by Elulmesh

== See also ==
- History of Sumer
- List of Mesopotamian dynasties
