= La-erabum =

La-erabum or Lasirab 𒆷𒂍𒊏𒀊
- King of Sumer
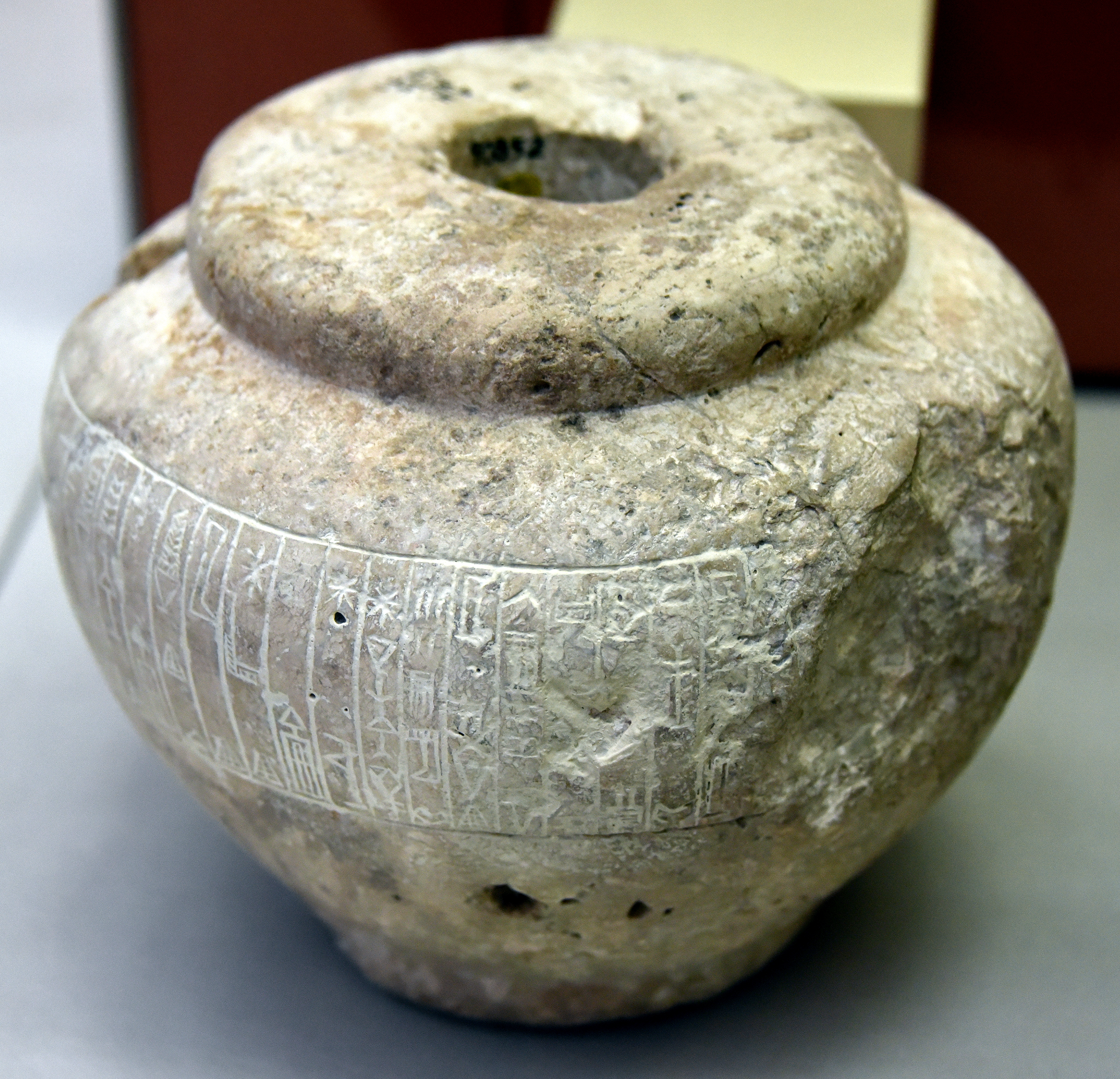
- Mace dedicated to a deity by La-erabum ("Lasirab"), king of Gutium. British Museum, BM 90852
- Reign: fl. circa 2150 BCE
- Predecessor: Apilkin
- Successor: Irarum
- Gutian language: La-erabum or Lasirab
- House: Gutian Dynasty of Sumer

Location of Sippar, where the macehead was excavated.

La-erabum or Lasirab (𒆷𒂍𒊏𒀊 la-é-ra-ab also read la-a_{3}-ra-ab, formerly read la-si-ra-ab, fl. circa 2150 BCE) was the 12th Gutian ruler of the Gutian Dynasty of Sumer.

== Sumerian King List ==
La-erabum is mentioned in the "Sumerian King List" (SKL). According to the SKL: La-erabum was the successor of Apilkin. Irarum then succeeded La-erabum, also according to the SKL.

== Votive macehead ==
A votive macehead with his name is located in the British Museum (BM 90852). It was excavated in ancient Sippar. The macehead inscription reads:

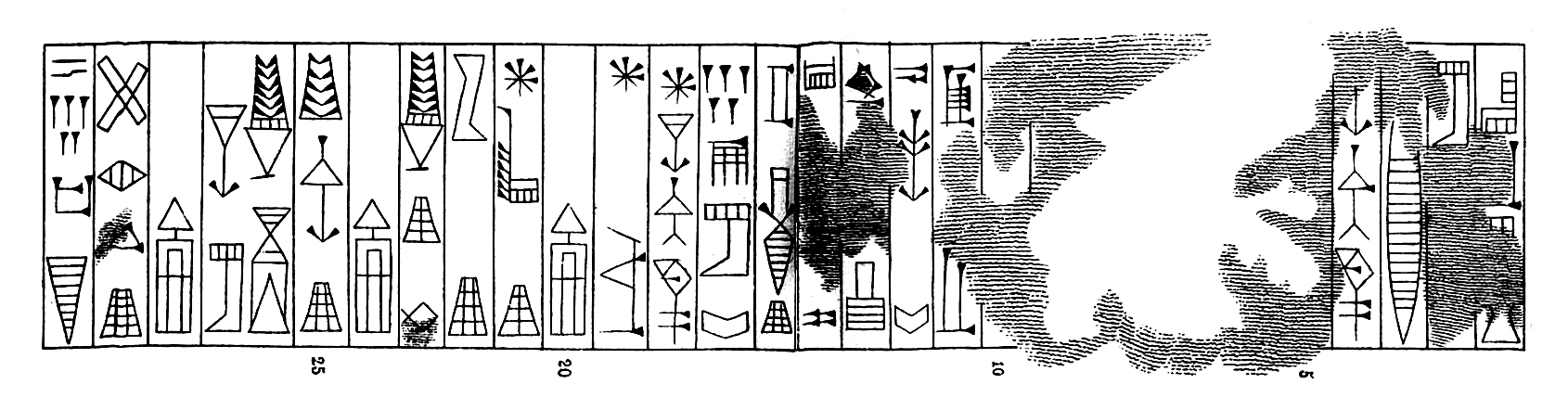
Laerabum mace inscription (complete transcription)

𒆷𒂍𒊏𒀊 / 𒁕𒈝 / 𒈗 / 𒄖𒋾𒅎 / [...] / 𒅁𒉌𒈠 / 𒀀𒈬𒊒 / 𒊭𒁾 / 𒋜𒀀 / 𒌋𒊓𒍝𒆪𒉌 / 𒅇𒋳𒋢 / 𒄿𒊓𒋫𒊒 / 𒀭𒄖𒋾𒅎 / 𒀭𒈹 / 𒅇 / 𒀭𒂗𒍪 / 𒁼𒋢 / 𒇷𒍪𒄩 / 𒅇 / 𒊺𒆰𒍪 / 𒇷𒅋𒄖𒁕 / 𒅇 / 𒆜𒆠[x]𒋢 / 𒀀𒄿𒋛𒅕

la-'a3-ra-ab / da-[num2] / lugal / gu-ti-im / (n lines broken) [...] / ib-[ni]-ma / a mu-ru / sha dub / su4-a / u-sa-sa3-ku-ni / u3 shum-su / i-sa-ta-ru / {d}gu-ti-im / {d}inanna / u3 / {d}suen / suhush-su / li-su2-ha / u3 / she-numun-su2 / li-il-qu3-ta2 / u3 / kaskal{ki}-x-su2 / a i-si-ir

"Lasirab, the mighty King of Guti, ...[6 colums damaged]... has made and presented this. Whoever removes this inscribed stone, and writes the mention of his name thereupon, his foundation may Guti (or, "the Gods of Gutium"), Nina and Sin tear up and exterminate his seed, and may whatsoever he undertakes not prosper"

— Macehead inscription of La-erabum, British Museum, BM 90852

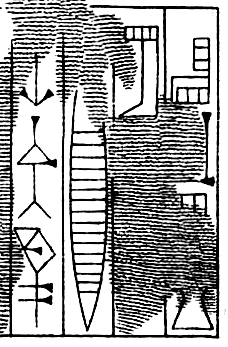
"La-eraab, great King of Gutiim" (𒆷𒂍𒊏𒀊 𒁕𒈝 𒈗 𒄖𒋾𒅎 la-e-ra-ab da-num lugal gutiim). The name is quite damaged, and was initially read "Lasiraab".

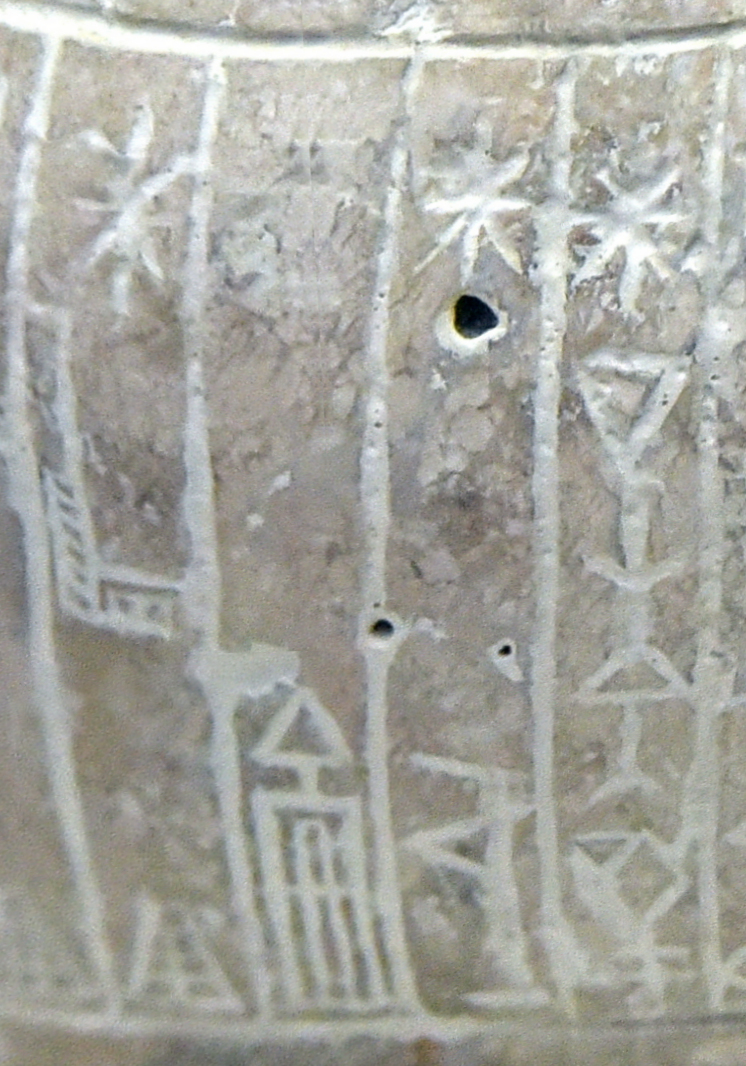
Portion of the inscription of the mace of La-erabum: "The Gods of Gutium, Innina and Sin" (𒀭𒄖𒋾𒅎 / 𒀭𒈹 / 𒅆𒂍 / 𒀭𒂗𒍪).

Preceded by Apilkin	Gutian Dynasty fl. circa 2150 BCE	Succeeded by Irarum

== See also ==
- History of Sumer
- List of Mesopotamian dynasties
