= Yarla =

- King of Sumer
- Reign: fl. late 3rd millennium BCE
- Predecessor: Ibate
- Successor: Kurum
- House: Gutian Dynasty of Sumer

Yarla or Yarlangab (fl. late 3rd millennium BCE) was the 9th Gutian ruler of the Gutian Dynasty of Sumer mentioned on the "Sumerian King List" (SKL). Yarla was the successor of Ibate. Kurum then succeeded Yarla.

Preceded by Ibate	King of Sumer fl. late 3rd millennium BCE	Succeeded by Kurum

== See also ==
- History of Sumer
- List of Mesopotamian dynasties
