= Sarlagab =

Sarlagab or Zarlagab
- King of Sumer
- Reign: fl. late 3rd millennium BC
- Predecessor: Inkishush
- Successor: Shulme
- House: Gutian Dynasty of Sumer

Sarlagab or Zarlagab (c. 2200 BC)) was the second Gutian ruler of the Gutian Dynasty of Sumer mentioned on the Sumerian King List as possibly reigning for six years.

Sarlagab may have been a contemporary of the Akkadian king Shar-kali-sharri (r. 2217-2193 BC), if he is the same Gutian king Sharlag whom Shar-kali-sharri captured according to one of his year-names: "the year in which Szarkaliszarri (...) took prisoner Szarlag(ab) the king of Gutium". According to the King List, he was the successor of Inkishush. Shulme then succeeded Sarlagab.

Preceded by Inkishush	King of Sumer fl. late 3rd millennium BC	Succeeded by Shulme

== See also ==
- History of Sumer
- List of Mesopotamian dynasties
