= Ibate =

- King of Sumer
- Reign: fl. late 3rd millennium BCE
- Predecessor: Yarlagab
- Successor: Yarla
- House: Gutian Dynasty of Sumer

Ibate (fl. late 3rd millennium BCE) was the 8th Gutian ruler of the Gutian Dynasty of Sumer mentioned on the Sumerian King List (SKL).

According to the SKL, Ibate was the successor of Yarlagab (Iarlagab). The latter reigned for 15 years while Ibate ruled for three (2154-2151 BC). His successor Yarla (Yarlangab) also reigned for three years.

Preceded by Yarlagab	King of Sumer fl. late 3rd millennium BCE	Succeeded by Yarla

== See also ==
- History of Sumer
- List of Mesopotamian dynasties
