= Apilkin =

- King of Sumer
- Reign: fl. late 3rd millennium BCE
- Predecessor: Kurum
- Successor: La-erabum
- Gutian language: Apilkin
- House: Gutian Dynasty of Sumer

Apilkin (fl. late 3rd millennium BCE) was the 11th Gutian ruler of the Gutian Dynasty of Sumer mentioned on the Sumerian King List (SKL). According to the SKL, Apilkin was the successor of Kurum and was succeeded by La-erabum.

Preceded by Kurum	King of Sumer fl. late 3rd millennium BCE	Succeeded by La-erabum

== See also ==
- History of Sumer
- List of Mesopotamian dynasties
