= Kurum =

- King of Sumer
- Reign: fl. late 3rd millennium BCE
- Predecessor: Yarla
- Successor: Apilkin
- House: Gutian Dynasty of Sumer

Kurum (fl. late 3rd millennium BCE) was the 10th Gutian ruler of the Gutian Dynasty of Sumer, mentioned on the "Sumerian King List" (SKL). According to the SKL; Kurum was the successor of Yarla. Apilkin then succeeded Kurum, likewise according to the SKL.

Preceded by Yarla	King of Sumer fl. late 3rd millennium BCE	Succeeded by Apilkin

== See also ==
- History of Sumer
- List of Mesopotamian dynasties
