= En-nun-tarah-ana =

En-nun-tarah-ana 𒂗𒉣𒁰𒀭𒈾

King of Uruk
- Reign: c. 2596 – c. 2588 BC
- Died: c. 2588 BC

En-nun-tarah-ana (died c. 2588 BC) was the ninth Sumerian ruler in the First Dynasty of Uruk. According to the Sumerian King List, he reigned for 8 years.

== See also ==
- Uruk

Regnal titles
Preceded by Possibly La-ba'shum	King of Sumer ca. 26th century BC	Succeeded by Possibly Mesh-he
Preceded by Possibly La-ba'shum	Ensi of Uruk c. 2596 – c. 2588 BC	Succeeded by Possibly Mesh-he
