= Sumerian King List =

Ancient text listing Sumerian Kingships

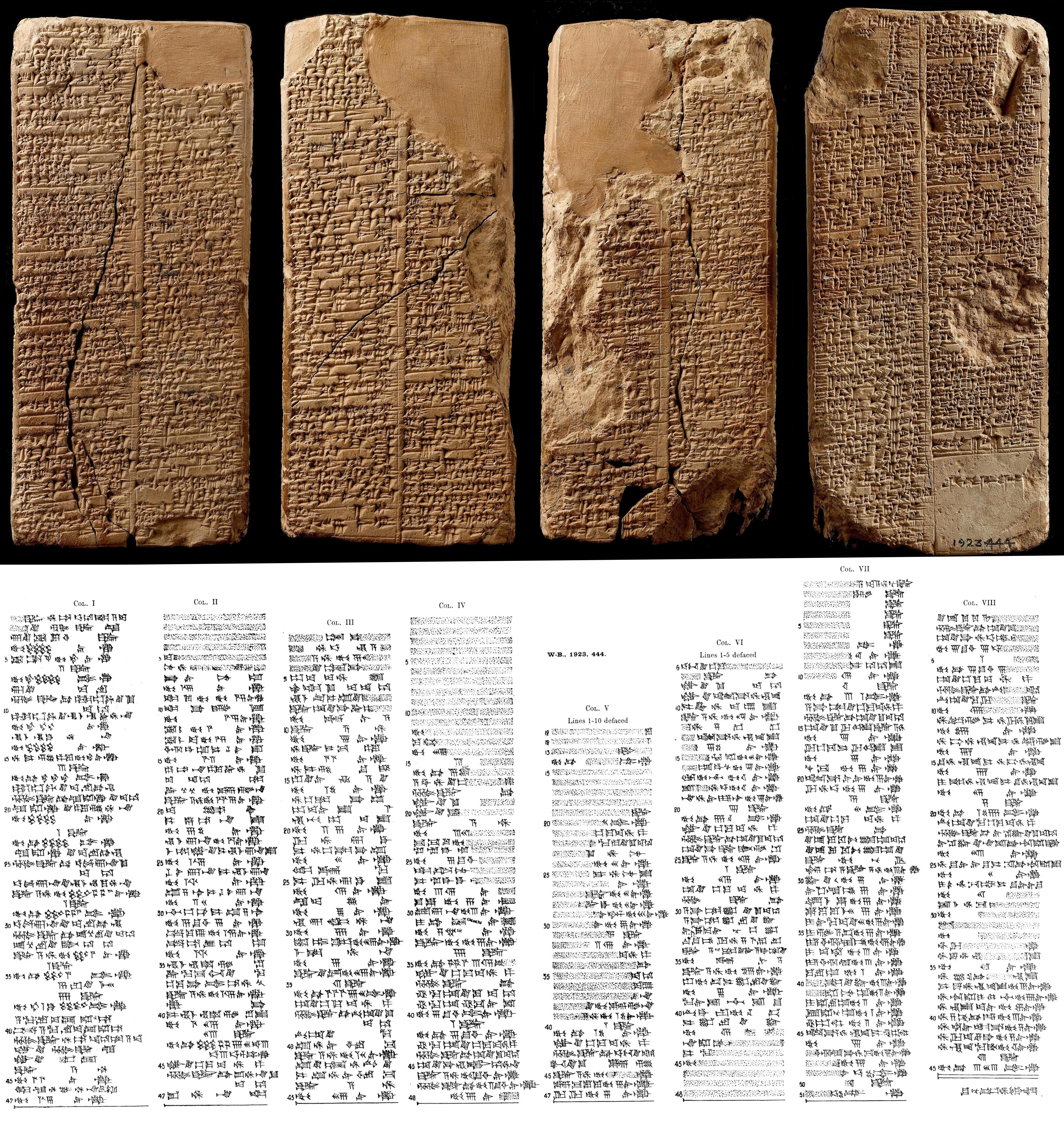
- The Sumerian King List inscribed onto the Weld-Blundell Prism, with transcription.
- Original title: 𒉆𒈗 (Nam-Lugal "Kingship").
- Translator: Jean-Vincent Scheil; Stephen Langdon; Thorkild Jacobsen
- Language: Sumerian
- Subject: Regnal list
- Genre: Literary
- Set in: Late-third to early-second millennia BC (c. 2900 – c. 1792 BC)
- Publication date: Ur III to Old Babylonian periods (c. 2084 – c. 1648 BC)
- Publication place: Sumer (ancient Iraq)
- English publication date: AD 1911–2014
- Media type: Clay tablets
- Text: Sumerian King List at the Electronic Text Corpus of Sumerian Literature

The Sumerian King List (abbreviated SKL) or Chronicle of the One Monarchy is an ancient literary composition written in Sumerian that was likely created and redacted to legitimize the claims to power of various city-states and kingdoms in southern Mesopotamia during the late third and early second millennium BC. It does so by repetitively listing Sumerian cities, the kings that ruled there, and the lengths of their reigns. Especially in the early part of the list, these reigns often span thousands of years. In the oldest known version, dated to the Ur III period (c. 2112 – c. 2004 BC) but probably based on Akkadian source material, the SKL reflected a more linear transition of power from Kish, the first city to receive kingship, to Akkad. In later versions from the Old Babylonian period, the list consisted of a large number of cities between which kingship was transferred, reflecting a more cyclical view of how kingship came to a city, only to be inevitably replaced by the next. In its best-known and best-preserved version, as recorded on the Weld-Blundell Prism, the SKL begins with a number of fictional antediluvian kings, who ruled before a flood swept over the land, after which kingship went to Kish. It ends with a dynasty from Isin (early second millennium BC), which is well-known from other contemporary sources.

The SKL is preserved in several versions, the first fragment of which was published in 1906 by Hermann Volrath Hilprecht, and the second in 1911 by Jean-Vincent Scheil. Most of these date to the Old Babylonian period, but the oldest version of the SKL dates back to the Ur III period. The clay tablets on which the SKL was recorded were generally found on sites in southern Mesopotamia. These versions differ in their exact content; some sections are missing, others are arranged in a different order, names of kings may be absent or the lengths of their reigns may vary. These differences are both the result of copying errors, and of deliberate editorial decisions to change the text to fit current needs.

In the past, the Sumerian King List was considered as an invaluable source for the reconstruction of the political history of Early Dynastic Mesopotamia. More recent research has indicated that the use of the SKL is fraught with difficulties, and that it should only be used with caution, if at all, in the study of ancient Mesopotamia during the third and early second millennium BC.

== Naming conventions ==
The text is best known under its modern name Sumerian King List, which is often abbreviated to SKL in scholarly literature. A less-used name is the Chronicle of the One Monarchy, reflecting the notion that, according to this text, there could ever be only one city exercising kingship over Mesopotamia. In contemporary sources, the SKL was called after its first word: "nam-lugal", or "kingship". It should also be noted that what is commonly referred to as the Sumerian King List, is in reality not a single text. Rather, it is a literary composition of which different versions existed through time in which sections were missing, arranged in a different order, and names, reigns and details on kings were different or absent.

Modern scholarship has used numbered dynasties to refer to the uninterrupted rule of a single city; hence the Ur III dynasty denotes the third time that the city of Ur assumed hegemony over Mesopotamia according to the SKL. This numbering (e.g. Kish I, Uruk IV, Ur III) is not present in the original text. It should also be noted that the modern usage of the term dynasty, i.e. a sequence of rulers from a single family, does not necessarily apply to ancient Mesopotamia. Even though the SKL points out that some rulers were family, it was the city, rather than individual rulers, to which kingship was given.

== Sources ==
Map of Iraq showing the archaeological sites where clay tablets containing (parts of) the Sumerian King List have been found.

The Sumerian King List is known from a number of different sources, all in the form of clay tablets or cylinders and written in Sumerian. At least 16 different tablets or fragments containing parts of the composition are known. Some tablets are unprovenanced, but most have been recovered, or are known to have come from various sites across Mesopotamia, the majority coming from Nippur. So far a version of the SKL has been found outside of Babylonia only twice. One copy was found at Susa in Elam. The other, found at Tell Leilan in Upper Mesopotamia, contains the only clean copy of the Mari list which is badly broken in other recensions.

There is only one manuscript that contains a relatively undamaged version of the composition. This is the Weld-Blundell Prism which includes the antediluvian part of the composition and ends with the Isin dynasty. Other manuscripts are incomplete because they are damaged or fragmentary. The Scheil dynastic tablet, from Susa, for example, only contains parts of the composition running from Uruk II to Ur III. Given the state of the SKL sources literary compositions like the Tummal Chronicle and the Ballad of the Early Rulers are used as input as well.

The majority of the sources are dated to the Old Babylonian period (early second millennium BC), and more specifically the early part of that era. In many cases, a more precise dating is not possible, but in one case, the Weld-Blundell prism, it could be dated to year 11 of the reign of king Sin-Magir of Isin, the last ruler to be mentioned in the Sumerian King List. The so-called Ur III Sumerian King List (USKL), on a clay tablet possibly found in Adab, is the only known version of the SKL that predates the Old Babylonian period. The colophon of this text mentions that it was copied during the reign of Shulgi (2084–2037 BC), the second king of the Ur III dynasty. The USKL is especially interesting because its pre-Sargonic part is completely different from that of the SKL. Whereas the SKL records many different dynasties from several cities, the USKL starts with a single long list of rulers from Kish (including rulers who, in the SKL were part of different Kish dynasties), followed by a few other dynasties, followed again by the kings of Akkad.

== Contents ==
Map of Iraq showing the cities that are mentioned in the Sumerian King List and that have been identified archaeologically. Akkad, Awan, Akshak and Larak have not yet been securely identified. Gutium is located in the Zagros Mountains.

The sources differ in their exact contents. This is not only the result of many sources being fragmentary, it is also the result of scribal errors made during copying of the composition, and of the fact that changes were made to the composition through time. For example, the section on rulers before the flood is not present in every copy of the text, including every text from Nippur, where the majority of versions of the SKL were found. Also, the order of some of the dynasties or kings may be changed between copies, some dynasties that were separately mentioned in one version are taken together in another, details on the lengths of individual reigns vary, and individual kings may be left out entirely.

The following summary and line numbers are taken from the compilation by the Electronic Text Corpus of Sumerian Literature, which in turn takes the text of the Weld-Blundell prism as its main source, listing other versions when there are differences in the text.

=== Lines 1–39: Before the flood ===
This section, which is not present in every copy of the text, opens with the line "After the kingship descended from heaven, the kingship was in Eridu." Two kings of Eridu are mentioned, before the city "fell" and the "kingship was taken to Bad-tibira". This pattern of cities receiving kingship and then falling or being defeated, only to be succeeded by the next, is present throughout the entire text, often in the exact same words. This first section lists eight kings who ruled over five cities (apart from Eridu and Bad-tibira, these also included Larag, Zimbir and Shuruppak). The duration of each reign is also given. In this first section, the reigns vary between 43,200 and 28,800 years for a total of 241,200 years. The section ends with the line "Then the flood swept over". Among the kings mentioned in this section is the ancient Mesopotamian god Dumuzid (the later Tammuz).

=== Lines 40–265: First dynasty of Kish to Lugal-zage-si ===
"After the flood had swept over, and the kingship descended from heaven, the kingship was in Kish." After this well-known line, the section goes on to list 23 kings of Kish, who ruled between 1500 and 300 years for a total of 24,510 years. The exact number of years varies between copies. Apart from the lengths of their reigns and whether they were the son of their predecessor (for example, "Mashda, the son of Atab, ruled for 840 years"), no other details are usually given on the exploits of these kings. Exceptions are Etana, "who ascended to heaven and consolidated all the foreign countries" and Enmebaragesi, "who made the land of Elam submit". Enmebaragesi is also the first king in the Sumerian King List whose name is attested from contemporaneous (Early Dynastic I) inscriptions. His successor Aga of Kish, the final king mentioned before Kish fell and kingship was taken to E-ana, also appears in the poem Gilgamesh and Aga.

The next lines, up until Sargon of Akkad, show a steady succession of cities and kings, usually without much detail beyond the lengths of the individual reigns. Every entry is structured exactly the same: the city where kingship is located is named, followed by one or more kings and how long they reigned, followed by a summary and a final line indicating where kingship went next. Lines 134–147 may serve as an example:

In Ur, Mesannepada became king; he ruled for 80 years. Meskiagnun, the son of Mesannepada, became king; he ruled for 36 years. Elulu ruled for 25 years. Balulu ruled for 36 years. 4 kings; they ruled for 171 years. Then Ur was defeated and the kingship was taken to Awan.

Individual reigns vary in length, from 1200 years for Lugalbanda of Uruk, to six years for another king of Uruk and several kings of Akshak. On average, the number of regnal years decreases down the list. Some city names, such as Uruk, Ur and Kish, appear more than once in the Sumerian King List. The earlier part of this section mentions several kings who are also known from other literary sources. These kings include Dumuzid the Fisherman and Gilgamesh, although virtually no king from the earlier part of this section appears in inscriptions dating from the actual period in which they were supposed to live. Lines 211–223 describe a dynasty from Mari, which is a city outside Sumer proper but which played an important role in Mesopotamian history during the late third and early second millennia BC. The following third dynasty of Kish consists of a single ruler Kug-Bau ("the woman tavern keeper"), thought to be the only queen listed in the Sumerian King List. The final two dynasties of this section, the fourth of Kish and the third of Uruk, provide a link to the next section. Sargon of Akkad is mentioned in the Sumerian King List as cup-bearer to Ur-zababa of Kish, and he defeated Lugal-zage-si of Uruk before founding his own dynasty.

=== Lines 266–377: Akkad to Isin ===
This section is devoted to the well-known Akkadian ruler Sargon and his successors. After the entry on Shar-kali-sharri, the Sumerian King List reads "Then who was king? Who was not king?", suggesting a period of chaos that may reflect the uncertain times during which the Akkadian Empire came to an end. Four kings are mentioned to have ruled for a total of only three years. Of the Akkadian kings mentioned after Shar-kali-sharri, only the names of Dudu and Shu-turul have been attested in inscriptions dating from the Akkadian period. The Akkadian dynasty is succeeded by the fourth dynasty of Uruk, two kings of which, Ur-nigin and his son Ur-gigir, appear in other contemporary inscriptions. Kingship was then taken to the "land" or "army" of Gutium, of which it was said that at first they had no kings and that they ruled themselves for a few years. After this short episode, 21 Gutian kings are listed before the fall of Gutium and kingship was taken to Uruk. Only one ruler is listed during this period of kingship (Utu-hegal), before it moved on to Ur. The so-called Third Dynasty of Ur consisted of 5 kings who ruled between 9 and 46 years. No other details of their exploits are given. The Sumerian King List remarks that, after the rule of Ur was abolished, "The very foundation of Sumer was torn out", after which kingship was taken to Isin. The kings of Isin are the final dynasty that is included in the list. The dynasty consisted of 14 kings who ruled between 3 and 33 years. As with the Ur III dynasty, no details are given on the reigns of individual kings.

=== Lines 378–431: Conclusion ===
Some versions of the Sumerian King List conclude with a summary of the dynasties after the flood. In this summary, the number of kings and their accumulated regnal years are mentioned for each city, as well as the number of times that city had received kingship: "A total of 12 kings ruled for 396 years, 3 times in Urim." The final line again tallies the numbers for all these dynasties: "There are 11 cities, cities in which the kingship was exercised. A total of 134 kings, who altogether ruled for 28876 + X years."

== Discussion ==
Assyriologist Piotr Steinkeller has observed that, with the exception of the Epic of Gilgamesh, there might not be a single cuneiform text with as much "name recognition" as the Sumerian King List. The SKL might also be among the compositions that have fuelled the most intense debate and controversy among academia. These debates generally focused on when, where and why it was created, and if and how the text can be used in the reconstruction of the political history of Mesopotamia during the third and second millennia BC.

=== Dating, redaction and purpose ===
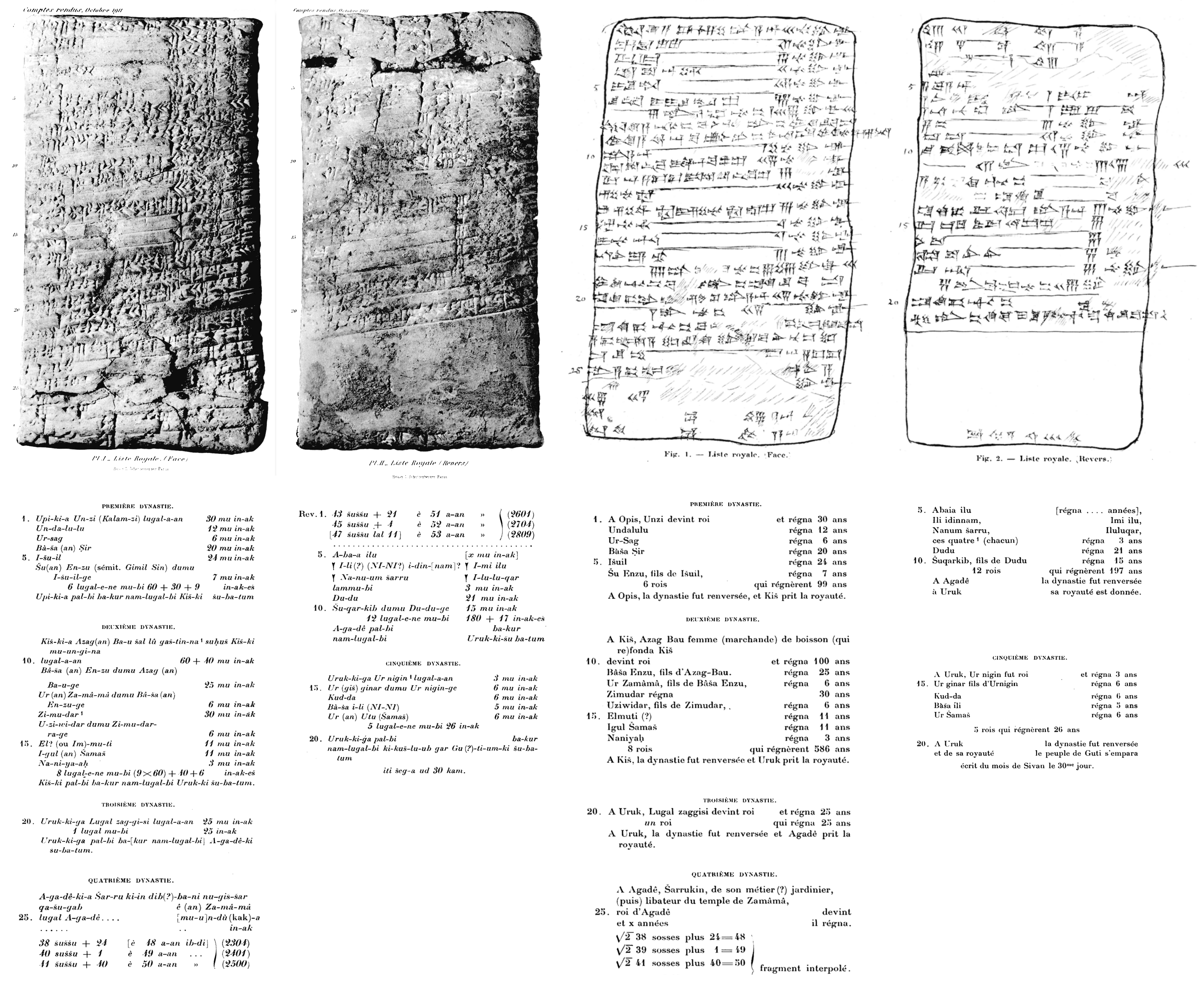
The Scheil dynastic tablet, containing a part of the Sumerian King List, from Uruk II to Ur III. Transcription and translation in French (1911).

All but one of the surviving versions of the Sumerian King List date to the Old Babylonian period, i.e. the early part of the second millennium BC. One version, the Ur III Sumerian King List (USKL) dates to the reign of Shulgi (2084–2037 BC). By carefully comparing the different versions, especially the USKL with the much later Old Babylonian versions of the SKL, it has been shown that the composition that is now known as the SKL was probably first created in the Sargonic period in a form very similar to the USKL. It has even been suggested that this precursor of the SKL was not written in Sumerian, but in Akkadian. The original contents of the USKL, especially the pre-Sargonic part, were probably significantly altered only after the Ur III period, as a reaction to the societal upheaval that resulted from the disintegration of the Ur III state at the end of the third millennium BC. This altering of the composition meant that the original long, uninterrupted list of kings of Kish was cut up in smaller dynasties (e.g. Kish I, Kish II, and so forth), and that other dynasties were inserted. The result was the SKL as it is known from Old Babylonian manuscripts such as the Weld-Blundell prism. The cyclical change of kingship from one city to the next became a so-called Leitmotif, or recurring theme, in the Sumerian King List.

It has been generally accepted that the main aim was not to provide a historiographical record of the political landscape of ancient Mesopotamia. Instead, it has been suggested that the SKL, in its various redactions, was used by contemporary rulers to legitimize their claims to power over Babylonia. Steinkeller has argued that the SKL was first created during the Akkad dynasty to position Akkad as a direct heir to the hegemony of Kish. Thus, it would make sense to present the predecessors to the Akkadian kings as a long, unbroken line of rulers from Kish. In this way the Akkadian dynasty could legitimize its claims to power over Babylonia by arguing that, from the earliest times onwards, there had always been a single city where kingship was exercised. Later rulers then used the Sumerian King List for their own political purposes, amending and adding to the text as they saw fit. This is why, for example, the version recorded on the Weld-Blundell prism ends with the Isin dynasty, suggesting that it was now their turn to rule over Mesopotamia as the rightful inheritors of the Ur III legacy. The use of the SKL as political propaganda may also explain why some versions, including the older USKL, did not contain the antediluvian part of the list. In its original form, the list started with the hegemony of Kish. Some city-states may have been uncomfortable with the preeminent position of Kish. By inserting a section of primordial kings who ruled before a flood, which is only known from some Old Babylonian versions, the importance of Kish could be downplayed.

=== Reliability as a historical source ===
During much of the 20th century, many scholars accepted the Sumerian King List as a historical source of great importance for the reconstruction of the political history of Mesopotamia, despite the problems associated with the text. For example, many scholars have observed that the kings in the early part of the list reigned for unnaturally long time spans. Various approaches have been offered to reconcile these long reigns with a historical time line in which reigns would fall within reasonable human bounds, and with what is known from the archaeological record as well as other textual sources. Thorkild Jacobsen argued in his major 1939 study of the SKL that, in principle, all rulers mentioned in the list should be considered historical because their names were taken from older lists that were kept for administrative purposes and could therefore be considered reliable. His solution to the reigns considered too long, then, was to argue that "[t]heir occurrence in our material must be ascribed to a tendency known also among other peoples of antiquity to form very exaggerated ideas of the length of human life in the earliest times of which they were conscious." In order to create a fixed chronology where individual kings could be absolutely dated, Jacobsen replaced time spans considered too long with average reigns of 20–30 years. For example, Etana ruled for 1500 years according to the SKL, but instead Jacobsen assumed a reign of circa 30 years. In this manner, and by working backwards from reigns whose dates could be independently established by other means, Jacobsen was able to fit all pre-Sargonic kings in a chronology consistent with the dates that were at that time (1939) accepted for the Early Dynastic period in Mesopotamia. Jacobsen has been criticised for putting too much faith in the reliability of the king list, for making wishful reconstructions and readings of incomplete parts of the list, for ignoring inconsistencies between the SKL and other textual evidence, and for ignoring the fact that only very few of the pre-Sargonic rulers have been attested in contemporaneous (i.e. Early Dynastic) inscriptions.

Others have attempted to reconcile the reigns in the Sumerian King List by arguing that many time spans were actually consciously invented, mathematically derived numbers. Rowton, for example, observed that a majority of the reigns in the Gutian dynasty were 5, 6, or 7 years in length. In the sexagesimal system used at that time, "about 6 years" would be the same as "about 10 years" in a decimal system (i.e. a general round number). This was sufficient evidence for him to conclude that at least these figures were completely artificial. The longer time spans from the first part of the list could also be argued to be artificial: various reigns were multiples of 60 (e.g. Jushur reigned for 600 years, Puannum ruled for 840 years) while others were squares (e.g. Ilku reigned for 900 years (square of 30) while Meshkiangasher ruled for 324 years (square of 18)).

During the last few decades, scholars have taken a more careful approach. For example, many recent handbooks on the archaeology and history of ancient Mesopotamia all acknowledge the problematic nature of the SKL and warn that the list's use as a historical document for that period is severely limited up to the point that it should not be used at all. It has been argued, for example, that the omission of certain cities in the list which were known to have been important at the time, such as Lagash and Larsa, was deliberate. Furthermore, the fact that the SKL adheres to a strict sequential ordering of kingships which were considered equal means that it does no justice at all to the actual complexities of Mesopotamian political history where different reigns overlapped, or where different rulers or cities were not equally powerful. Recent studies on the SKL even go so far as to discredit the composition as a valuable historical source on Early Dynastic Mesopotamia altogether. Important arguments to dismiss the SKL as a reliable and valuable source are its nature as a political, ideological text, its long redactional history, and the fact that out of the many pre-Sargonic kings listed, only seven have been attested in contemporary Early Dynastic inscriptions. The final volume on the history and philology of third millennium BC Mesopotamia of the ESF-funded ARCANE-project (Associated Regional Chronologies for the Ancient Near East and the Eastern Mediterranean), for example, did not list any of the pre-Sargonic rulers from the SKL in its chronological tables unless their existence was corroborated by Early Dynastic inscriptions.

Thus, in the absence of independent sources from the Early Dynastic period itself, the pre-Sargonic part of the SKL must be considered fictional. Many of the rulers in the pre-Sargonic part (i.e. prior to Sargon of Akkad) of the list must therefore be considered as purely fictional or mythological characters to which reigns of hundreds of years were assigned. However, there is a small group of pre-Sargonic rulers in the SKL whose names have been attested in Early Dynastic inscriptions. This group consists of seven rulers: Enmebaragesi, Gilgamesh, Mesannepada, Meskiagnun, Elulu, Enshakushanna and Lugal-zage-si. It has also been shown that several kings did not rule sequentially as described by the Sumerian King List, but rather contemporaneously. Starting with the Akkadian rulers, but especially for the Ur III and Isin dynasties, the SKL becomes much more reliable. Not only are most of the kings attested in other contemporaneous documents, but the reigns attributed to them in the SKL are more or less in line with what can be established from those other sources. This is probably due to the fact that the compilers of the SKL could rely on lists of year names, which came in regular use during the Akkadian period. Other sources may have included votive and victory inscriptions.

However, while the SKL has little value for the study on Early Dynastic Mesopotamia, it continues to be an important document for the study on the Sargonic to Old Babylonian periods. The Sumerian King List offers scholars a window into how Old Babylonian kings and scribes viewed their own history, how they perceived the concept of kingship, and how they could have used it to further their own goals. For example, it has been noted that the king list is unique among Sumerian compositions in there being no divine intervention in the process of dynastic change. Also, the style and contents of the Sumerian King List certainly influenced later compositions such as the Curse of Akkad, the Lamentation over Sumer and Akkad, later king lists such as the Assyrian King List, and the Babyloniaca by Berossus.

== Rulers in the Sumerian King List ==
Early dates are approximate, and are based on available archaeological data. For most of the pre-Akkadian rulers listed, the king list is itself the source of information. Beginning with Lugal-zage-si and the Third Dynasty of Uruk (which was defeated by Sargon of Akkad), a better understanding of how subsequent rulers fit into the chronology of the ancient Near East can be deduced. The short chronology is used here.

Antediluvian rulers

None of the following predynastic antediluvian rulers have been verified as historical by archaeological excavations, epigraphical inscriptions or otherwise. While there is no evidence they ever reigned as such, the Sumerians purported them to have lived in the mythical era before the great deluge.

The "antediluvian" reigns were measured in Sumerian numerical units known as sars (units of 3,600), ners (units of 600), and sosses (units of 60). Attempts have been made to map these numbers into more reasonable regnal lengths.

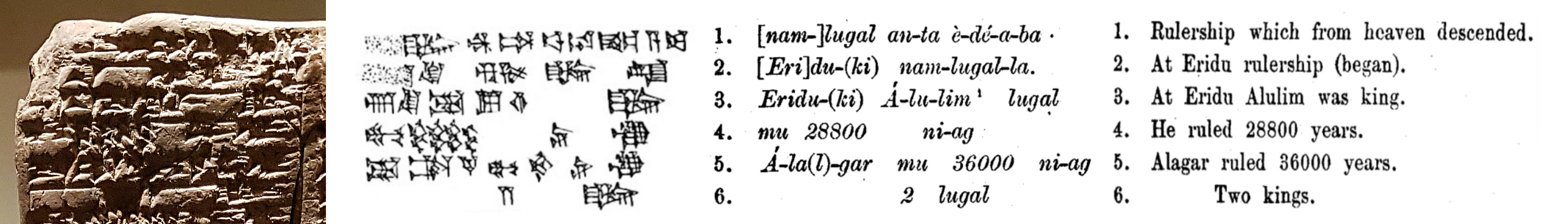
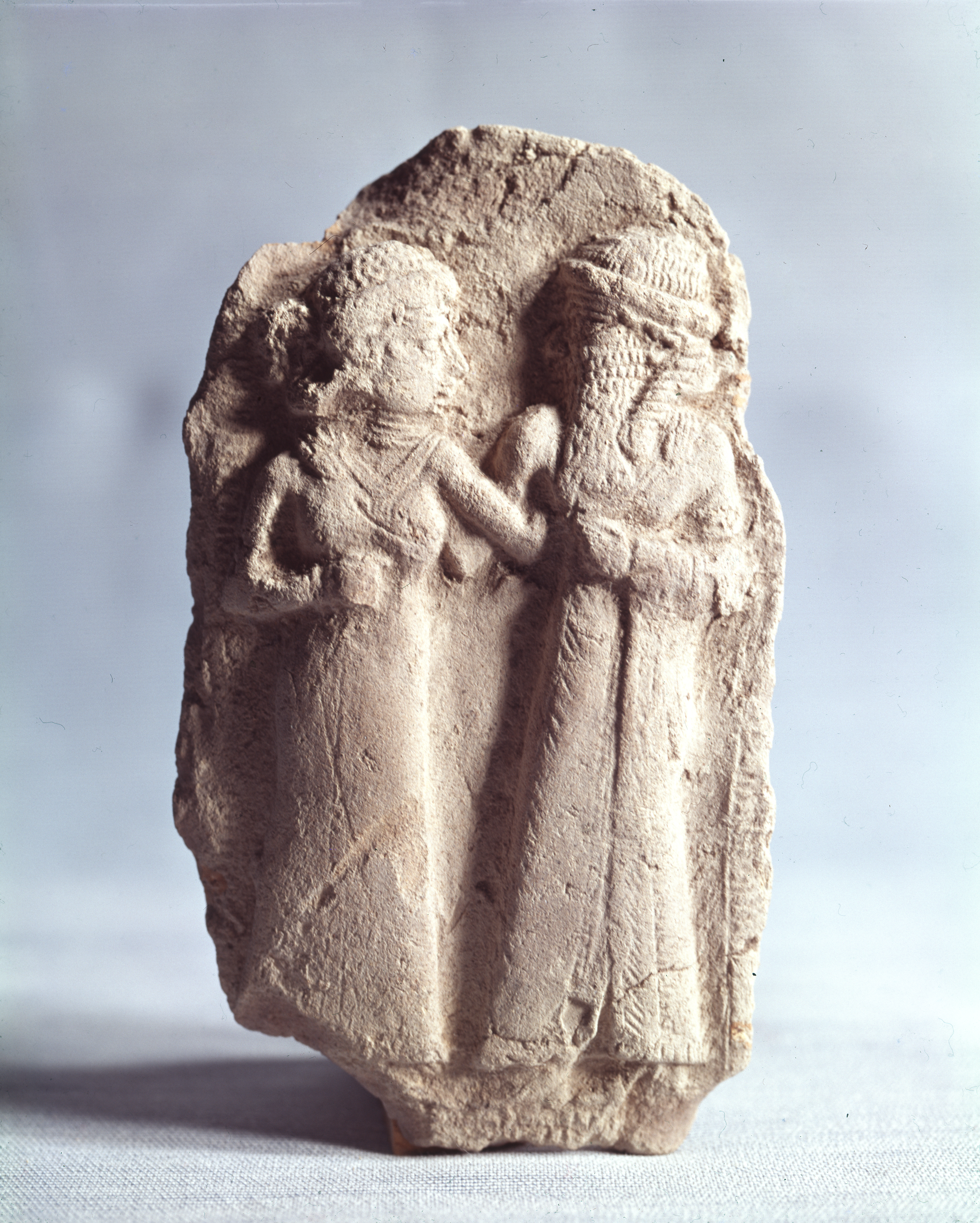
| Ruler | Epithet | Length of reign | Approx. dates | Comments |
|---|---|---|---|---|
"After the kingship descended from heaven, the kingship was in Eridug."
| Alulim | | 8 sars (28,800 years) | | Weld-Blundell Prism: initial paragraph about rule of Alulim and Alalngar in Eridu for 64,800 years. A variant of the document gives a different set of rulers with completely different regnal dates. (Note: 1. Alulim from Habur (Eridu) — 67,200 years; 2. Alalngar — 67,200 years; 3. ... from Ellasar (?) — 72,000 years; 4. ... — 21,600 years; 5. Dumuzid from Bad-tibira — 28,800 years; 6. En-men-lu-ana — 21,600 years; 7. En-sipad-zid-ana from Larak — 36,000 years; 8. En-men-dur-ana from Sippar — 72,000 years; 9. Arad-gin from Shuruppak — 28,800 years; 10. Ziusudra — 36,000 years) |
| Alalngar | | 10 sars (36,000 years) | | Weld-Blundell Prism: initial paragraph about rule of Alulim and Alalngar in Eridu for 64,800 years. A variant of the document gives a different set of rulers with completely different regnal dates. |
"Then Eridug fell and the kingship was taken to Bad-tibira."
| En-men-lu-ana | | 12 sars (43,200 years) |
| En-men-gal-ana | | 8 sars (28,800 years) |
| Dumuzid | "the shepherd" | 10 sars (36,000 years) | | Dumuzid was deified and was the object of later devotional depictions, as the husband of goddess Inanna. |
"Then Bad-tibira fell and the kingship was taken to Larag."
| En-sipad-zid-ana | | 8 sars (28,800 years) |
"Then Larag fell and the kingship was taken to Zimbir."
| En-men-dur-ana | | 5 sars and 5 ners (21,000 years) | | Emmeduranki was taught arts of divination, such as how to inspect oil on water and how to discern messages in the liver of animals and several other divine secrets. |
"Then Zimbir fell and the kingship was taken to Shuruppag."
| Ubara-Tutu | | 5 sars and 1 ner (18,600 years) | | Father of Utnapishtim in Epic of Gilgamesh |
"Then the flood swept over."

First dynasty of Kish

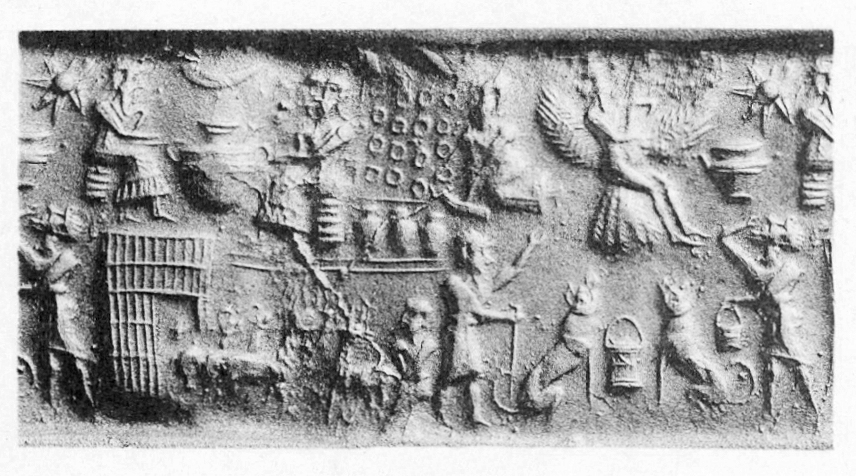
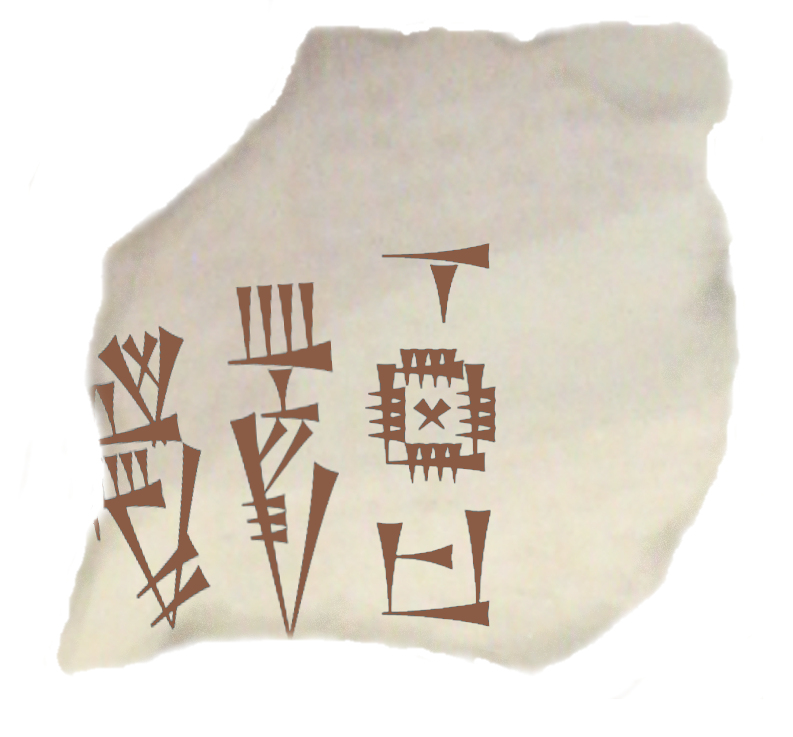
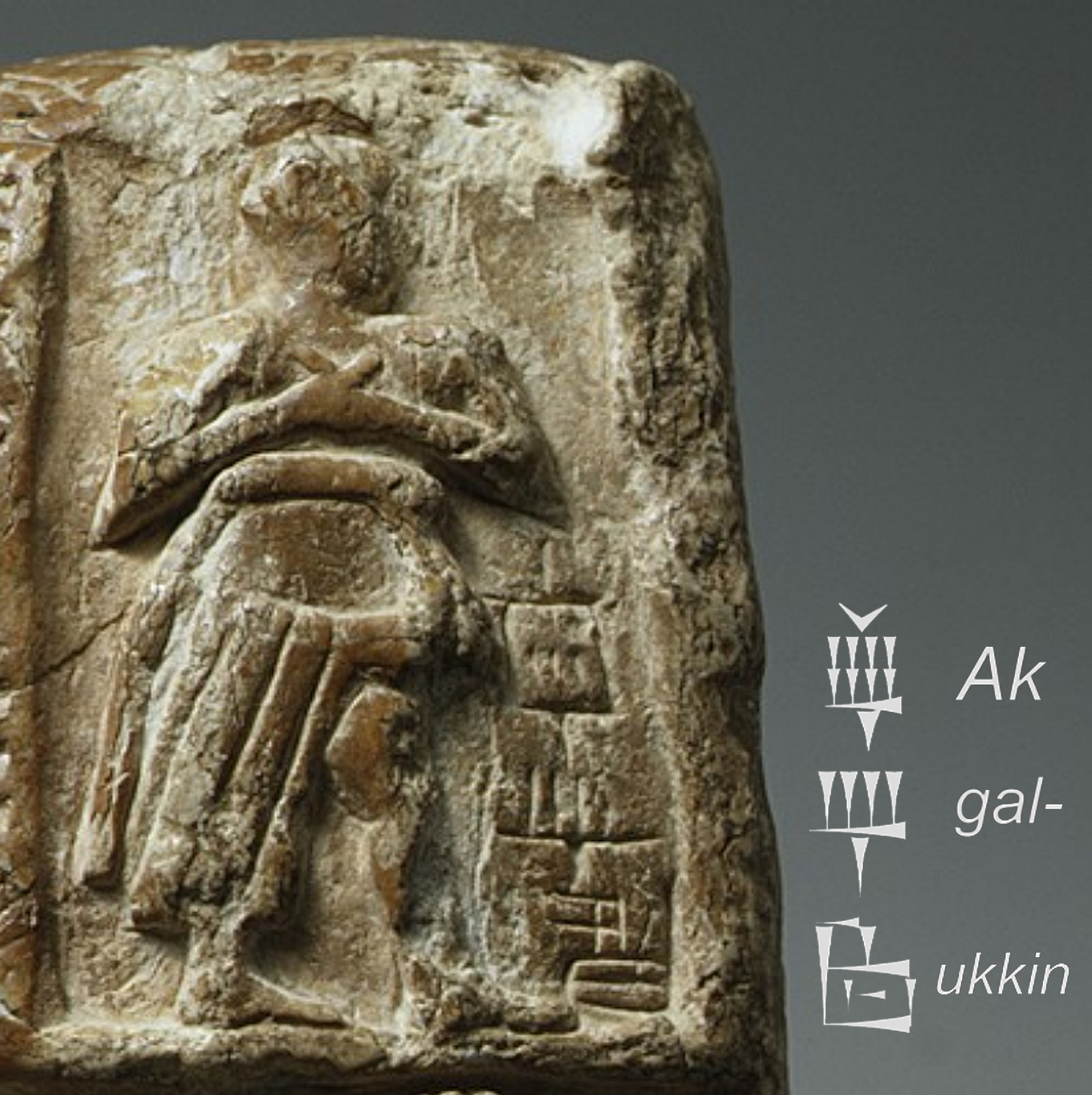
| Ruler | Epithet | Length of reign | Approx. dates | Comments |
|---|---|---|---|---|
"After the flood had swept over, and the kingship had descended from heaven, the kingship was in Kish."
| Jushur | | 1,200 years | historicity uncertain | Names before Etana are archaeologically unverified. |
| Kullassina-bel | | 960 years | | Name is Akkadian for "Lord of all women" or possibly "All of them were lord". |
| Nangishlishma | | 670 years |
| En-tarah-ana | | 420 years, 3 months, and 3 and a half days | | Why the reign length is so specific is unknown. |
| Babum | | 300 years | | Name is Akkadian for "gate". |
| Puannum | | 840 years |
| Kalibum | | 960 years | | Name is Akkadian for "dog", also symbolic for humility. |
| Kalumum | | 840 years | | Name is Akkadian for "lamb". |
| Zuqaqip | | 900 years | | Name is Akkadian for "scorpion". |
| Atab (or A-ba) | | 600 years |
| Mashda | "the son of Atab" | 840 years | | Name is Akkadian for "gazelle". |
| Arwium | "the son of Mashda" | 720 years | | Name is Akkadian for "male gazelle". |
| Etana | "the shepherd, who ascended to heaven and consolidated all the foreign countries" | 1,500 years | | Myth of Etana exists |
| Balih | "the son of Etana" | 400 years |
| En-me-nuna | | 660 years |
| Melem-Kish | "the son of En-me-nuna" | 900 years |
| Barsal-nuna | ("the son of En-me-nuna")* | 1,200 years | | Name is Sumerian that might mean "Sheep of the Prince". |
| Zamug | "the son of Barsal-nuna" | 140 years |
| Tizqar | "the son of Zamug" | 305 years |
| Ilku | | 900 years |
| Iltasadum | | 1,200 years |
| Enmebaragesi | "who made the land of Elam submit" | 900 years | EDI | Earliest ruler on the list to be attested directly from archeology. |
| Aga of Kish | "the son of En-me-barage-si" | 625 years | EDI | According to Gilgamesh and Aga he fought Gilgamesh. |
"Then Kish was defeated and the kingship was taken to E-anna."

First rulers of Uruk

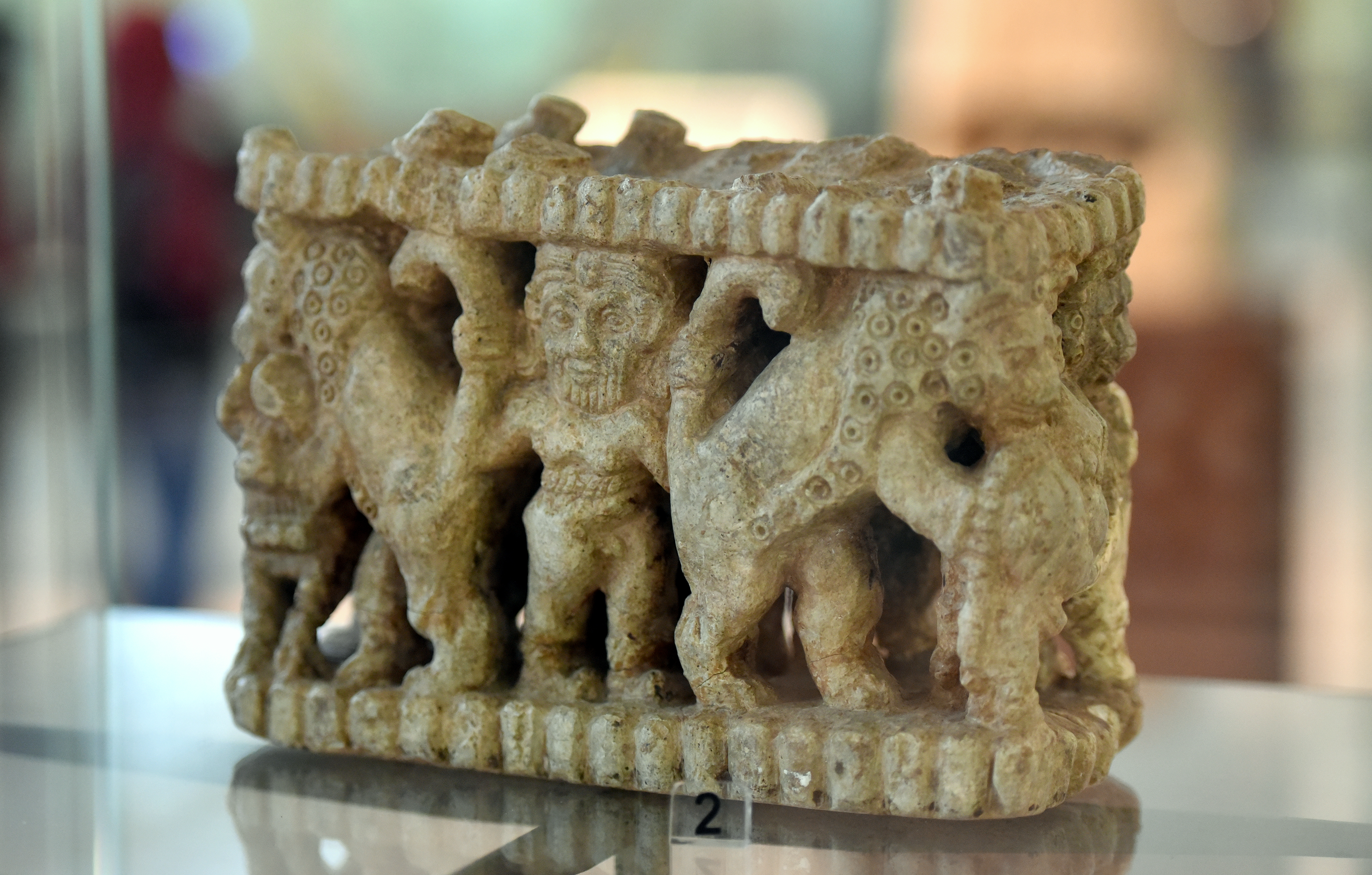
| Ruler | Epithet | Length of reign | Approx. dates | Comments |
|---|---|---|---|---|
| Mesh-ki-ang-gasher of E-ana | "the son of Utu" | 324 years | Late Uruk Period | Historicity doubted, thought to be an addition by the Ur III period. |
"Mesh-ki-ang-gasher entered the sea and disappeared."
| Enmerkar | "the son of Mesh-ki-ang-gasher, the king of Unug, who built Unug (Uruk)" | 420 years | Late Uruk Period |
| Lugalbanda | "the shepherd" | 1,200 years | Late Uruk Period | Historicity is uncertain among scholars. |
| Dumuzid the Fisherman | "the fisherman whose city was Kuara." "He was taken captive by the single hand of Enmebaragesi" | 100 years | Jemdet Nasr period | Historicity doubted, thought to be an addition by the Ur III period. |
| Gilgamesh | "whose father was a phantom (?), the lord of Kulaba" | 126 years | EDI | Contemporary with Aga of Kish, according to Gilgamesh and Aga |
| Ur-Nungal | "the son of Gilgamesh" | 30 years |
| Udul-kalama | "the son of Ur-Nungal" | 15 years |
| La-ba'shum | | 9 years |
| En-nun-tarah-ana | | 8 years |
| Mesh-he | "the smith" | 36 years |
| Melem-ana | | 6 years |
| Lugal-kitun | | 36 years |
"Then Unug was defeated and the kingship was taken to Urim (Ur)."

First dynasty of Ur

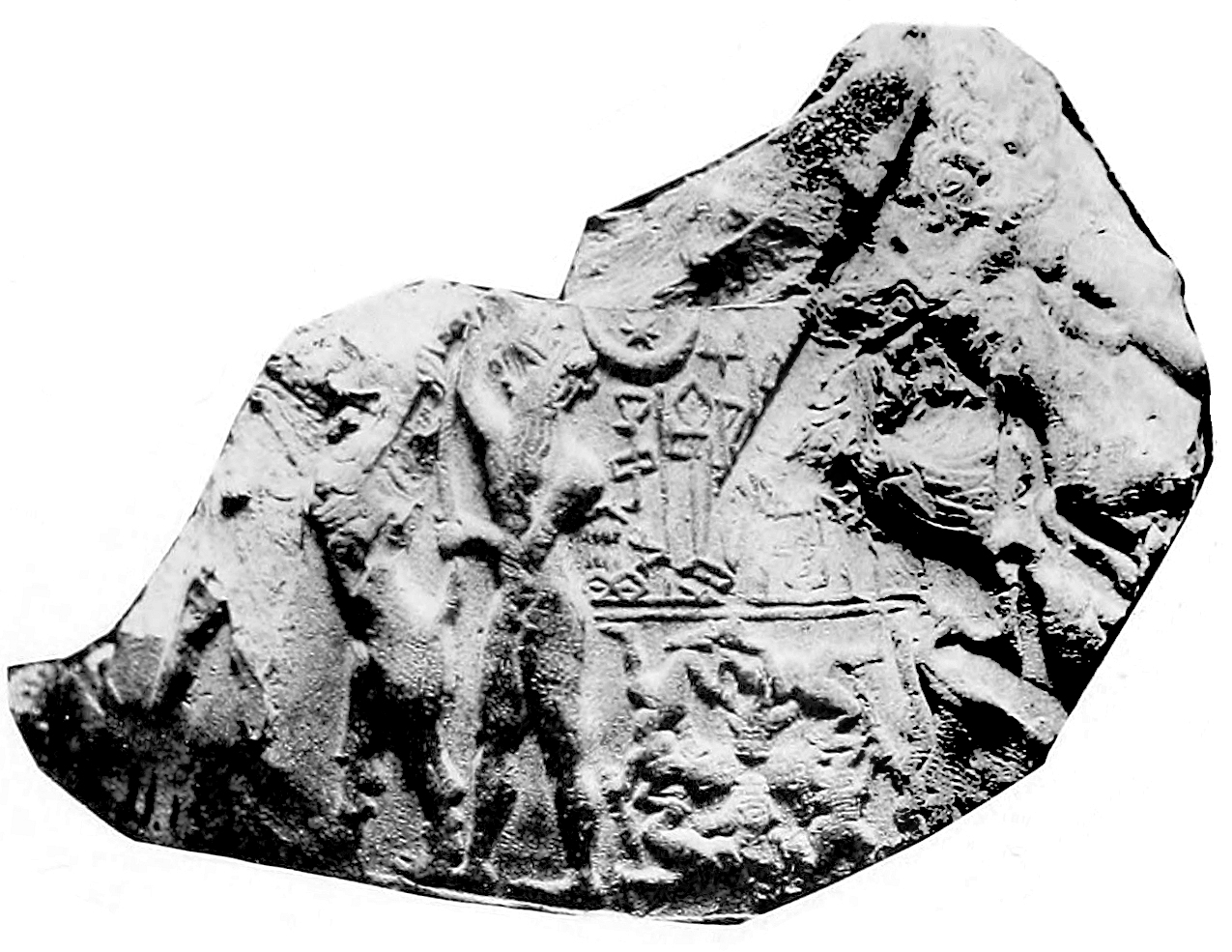
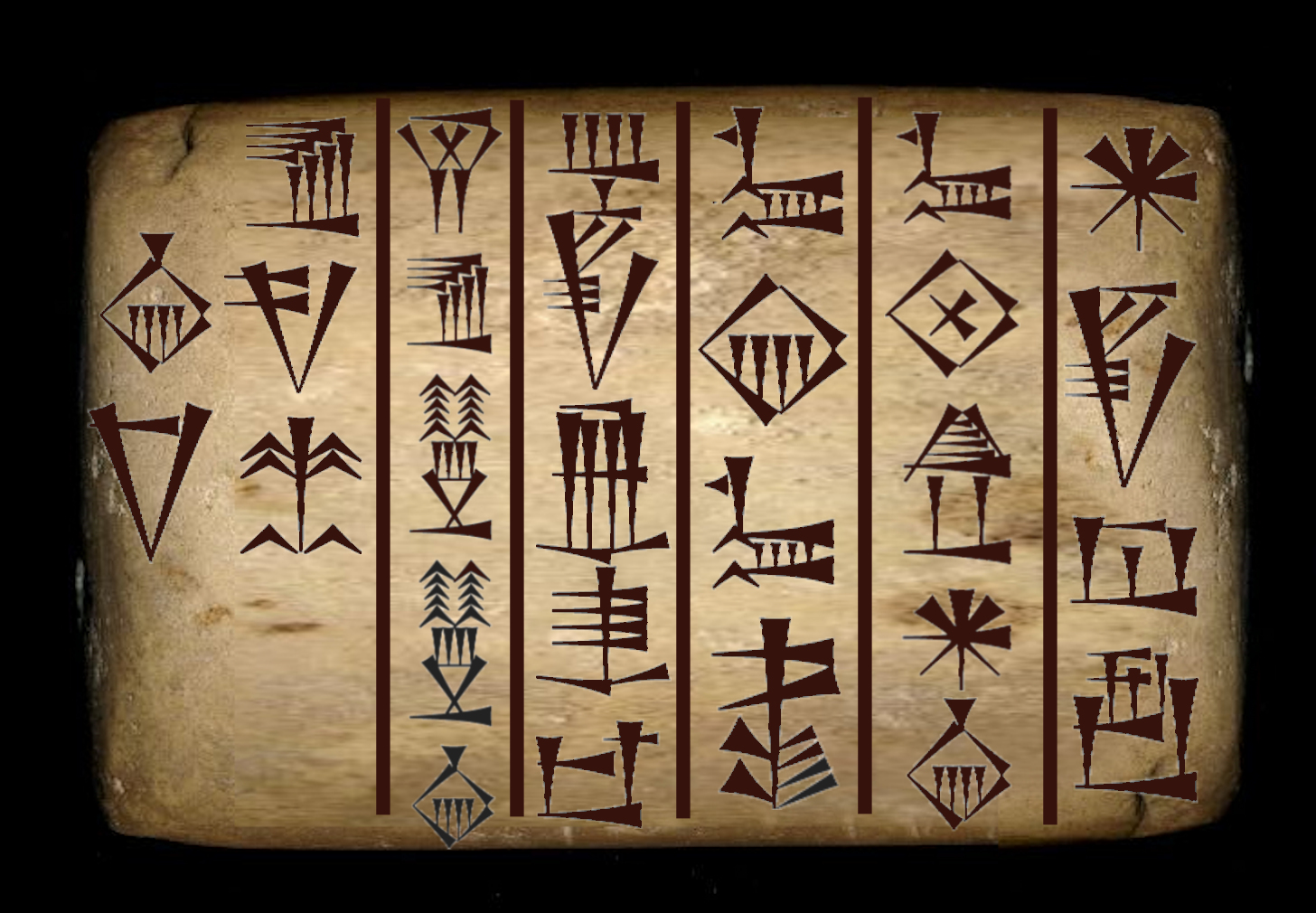
| Ruler | Epithet | Length of reign | Approx. dates | Comments |
|---|---|---|---|---|
| Mesh-Ane-pada | | 80 years | c. 27th century BC | Existence is likely as it is supported by many tablets. |
| Mesh-ki-ang-Nuna | "the son of Mesh-Ane-pada" | 36 years |
| Elulu | | 25 years |
| Balulu | | 36 years |
"Then Urim was defeated and the kingship was taken to Awan."

Dynasty of Awan

This was a dynasty from Elam.

| Ruler | Epithet | Length of reign | Approx. dates | Comments |
|---|---|---|---|---|
| Three kings of Awan | | 356 years | | Name lost due to a lacunae. |
"Then Awan was defeated and the kingship was taken to Kish."

Second dynasty of Kish

| Ruler | Epithet | Length of reign | Approx. dates | Comments |
|---|---|---|---|---|
| Susuda | "the fuller" | 201 years | EDII |
| Dadasig | | 81 years |
| Mamagal | "the boatman" | 360 years |
| Kalbum | "the son of Mamagal" | 195 years |
| Tuge | | 360 years |
| Men-nuna | "the son of Tuge" | 180 years |
| (Enbi-Ishtar) | | 290 years | | Defeated by Enshakushanna when Kish was sacked. |
| Lugalngu | | 360 years |
"Then Kish was defeated and the kingship was taken to Hamazi."

The First dynasty of Lagash (c. 2500 – c. 2271 BC) is not mentioned in the King List, though it is well known from inscriptions

Dynasty of Hamazi

| Ruler | Epithet | Length of reign | Approx. dates | Comments |
|---|---|---|---|---|
| Hadanish | | 360 years |
"Then Hamazi was defeated and the kingship was taken to Unug (Uruk)."

Second dynasty of Uruk

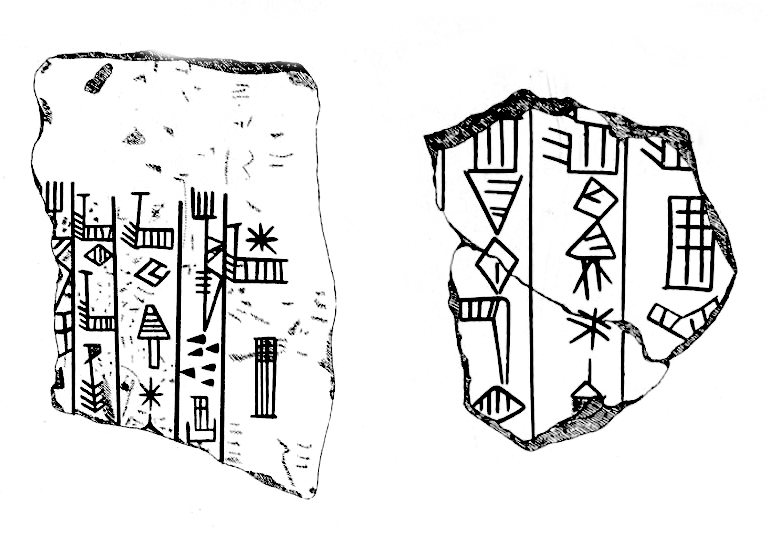
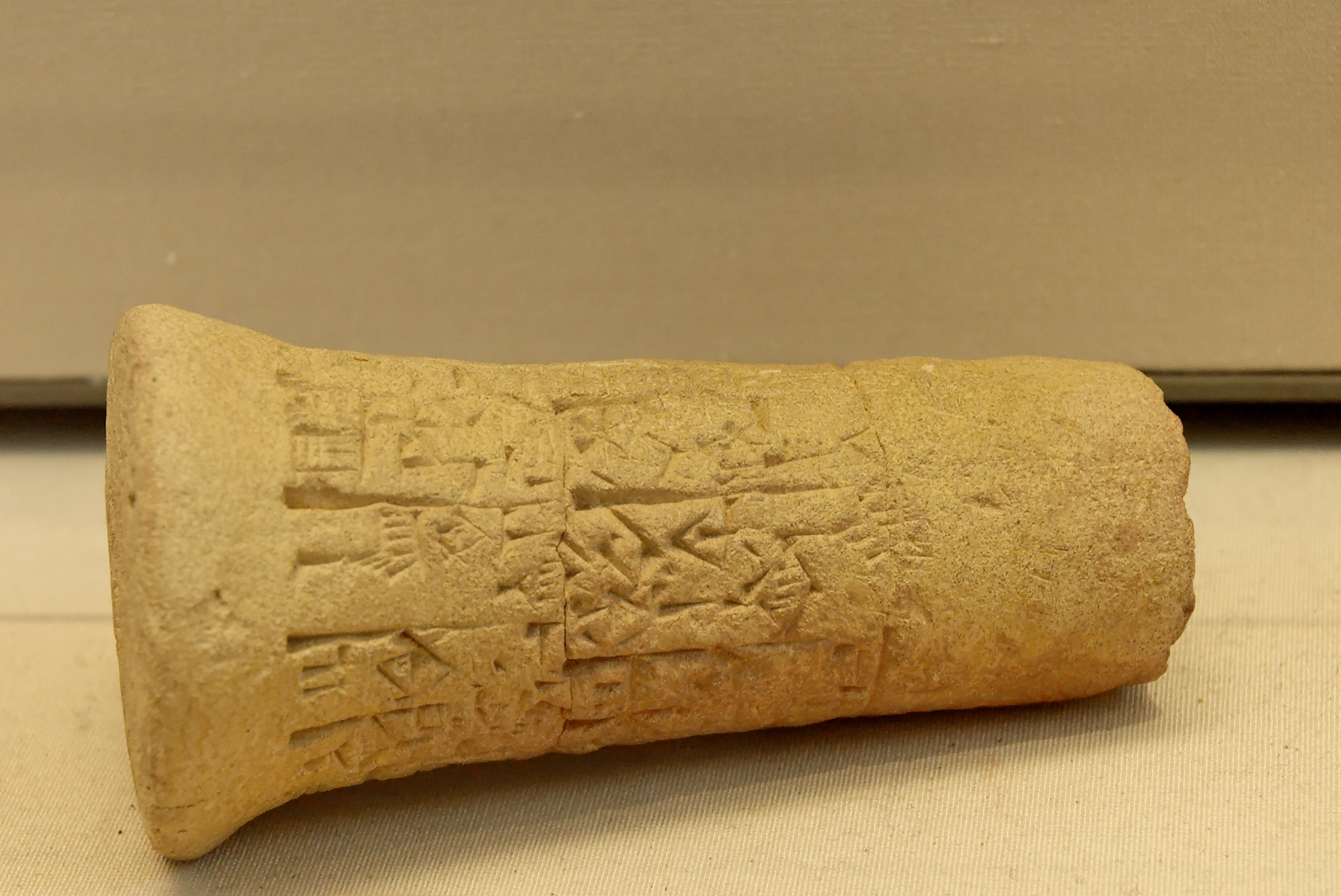
| Ruler | Epithet | Length of reign | Approx. dates | Comments |
|---|---|---|---|---|
| En-shag-kush-ana | | 60 years | c. 25th century BC | Said to have conquered parts of Sumer; then Eannatum of Lagash claims to have taken over Sumer, Kish, and all Mesopotamia. |
| Lugal-kinishe-dudu or Lugal-ure | | 120 years | | Contemporary with Entemena of Lagash |
| Argandea | | 7 years |
"Then Unug was defeated and the kingship was taken to Urim (Ur)."

Second dynasty of Ur

| Ruler | Epithet | Length of reign | Approx. dates | Comments |
|---|---|---|---|---|
| Nanni | | 120 years |
| Mesh-ki-ang-Nanna II | "the son of Nanni" | 48 years |
"Then Urim was defeated and the kingship was taken to Adab."

Dynasty of Adab

Other rulers of Adab are known, besides Lugal-Ane-mundu, but they are not mentioned in the Sumerian King List.

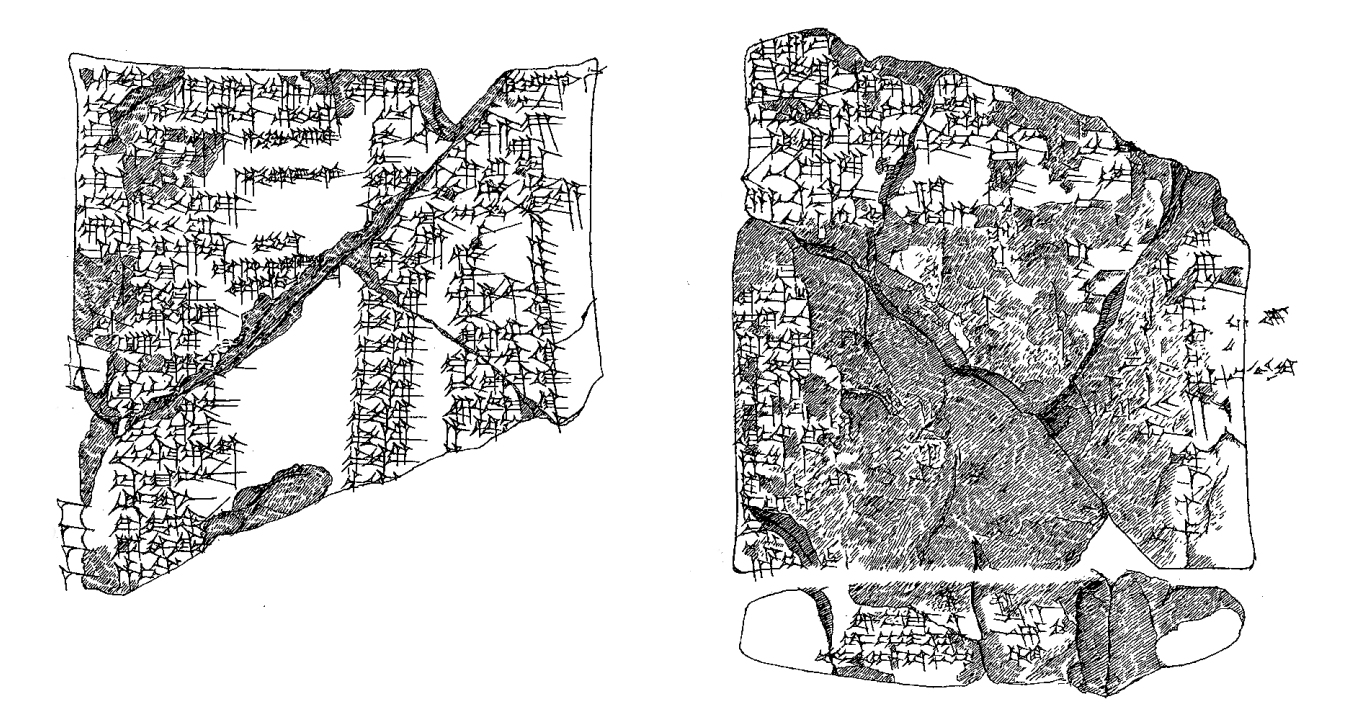
| Ruler | | Epithet | Length of reign | Approx. dates | Comments |
|---|---|---|---|---|---|
| Lugal-Ane-mundu | Lugal-Anne-Mundu inscription | | 90 years | c. 25th century BC | Known from other inscriptions. Said to have conquered all Mesopotamia from the Persian Gulf to the Zagros Mountains and Elam. |
"Then Adab was defeated and the kingship was taken to Mari."

Dynasty of Mari

Many rulers are known from Mari, but different names are mentioned in the Sumerian king list.

| Ruler | Epithet | Length of reign | Approx. dates | Comments |
|---|---|---|---|---|
| Anbu | | 30 years |
| Anba | "the son of Anbu" | 17 years |
| Bazi | "the leatherworker" | 30 years |
| Zizi of Mari | "the fuller" | 20 years |
| Limer | "the 'gudug' priest" | 30 years | | Gudug was a rank in the hierarchy of the Mesopotamian temple workers, a guduj priest was not specialized to a certain deity cult, and served in many temples. |
| Sharrum-iter | | 9 years |
"Then Mari was defeated and the kingship was taken to Kish."

Third dynasty of Kish

| Ruler | Epithet | Length of reign | Approx. dates | Comments |
|---|---|---|---|---|
| Kug-Bau (Kubaba) | "the woman tavern-keeper, who made firm the foundations of Kish" | 100 years | c. 24th century BC | The only known woman in the King List; said to have gained independence from En-anna-tum I of Lagash and En-shag-kush-ana of Uruk; contemporary with Puzur-Nirah of Akshak, according to the millennia later Weidner Chronicles. |
"Then Kish was defeated and the kingship was taken to Akshak."

Dynasty of Akshak

| Ruler | Epithet | Length of reign | Approx. dates | Comments |
|---|---|---|---|---|
| Unzi | | 30 years |
| Undalulu | | 6 years |
| Urur | | 6 years |
| Puzur-Nirah | | 20 years | | Contemporary with Kug-Bau of Kish, according to the millennia later Weidner Chronicles. Note Puzur-Nirah (son of Puzur-Su’en) is also an eponym in the Old Assyrian period |
| Ishu-Il | | 24 years |
| Shu-Suen of Akshak | "the son of Ishu-Il" | 7 years |
"Then Akshak was defeated and the kingship was taken to Kish."

Fourth dynasty of Kish

| Ruler | Epithet | Length of reign | Approx. dates | Comments |
|---|---|---|---|---|
| Puzur-Suen | "the son of Kug-Bau" | 25 years | c. 2350 BC |
| Ur-Zababa | "the son of Puzur-Suen" | 400 (6?) years | c. 2350 BC | According to the king list, Sargon of Akkad was his cup-bearer |
| Zimudar | | 30 years |
| Usi-watar | "the son of Zimudar" | 7 years |
| Eshtar-muti | | 11 years |
| Ishme-Shamash | | 11 years |
| (Shu-ilishu)* | | (15 years)* |
| Nanniya | "the jeweller" | 7 years |
"Then Kish was defeated and the kingship was taken to Unug (Uruk)."

Third dynasty of Uruk

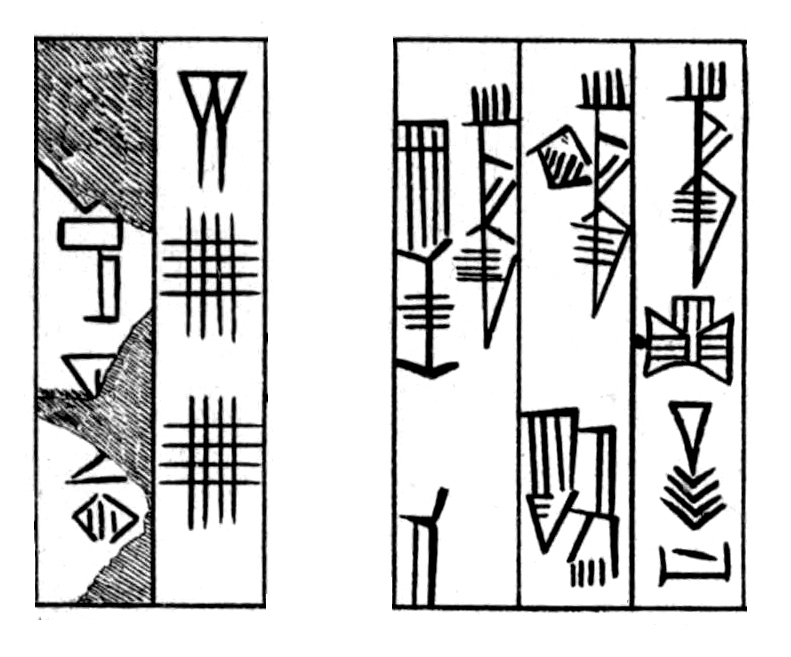
| Ruler | Epithet | Length of reign | Approx. dates | Comments |
|---|---|---|---|---|
| Lugal-zage-si | | 25 years | c. 2296–2271 BC (short) | Said to have defeated Urukagina of Lagash, as well as Kish and other Sumerian cities, creating a unified kingdom; he in turn was overthrown by Sargon of Akkad |
"Then Unug was defeated and the kingship was taken to Agade (Akkad)"

Dynasty of Akkad

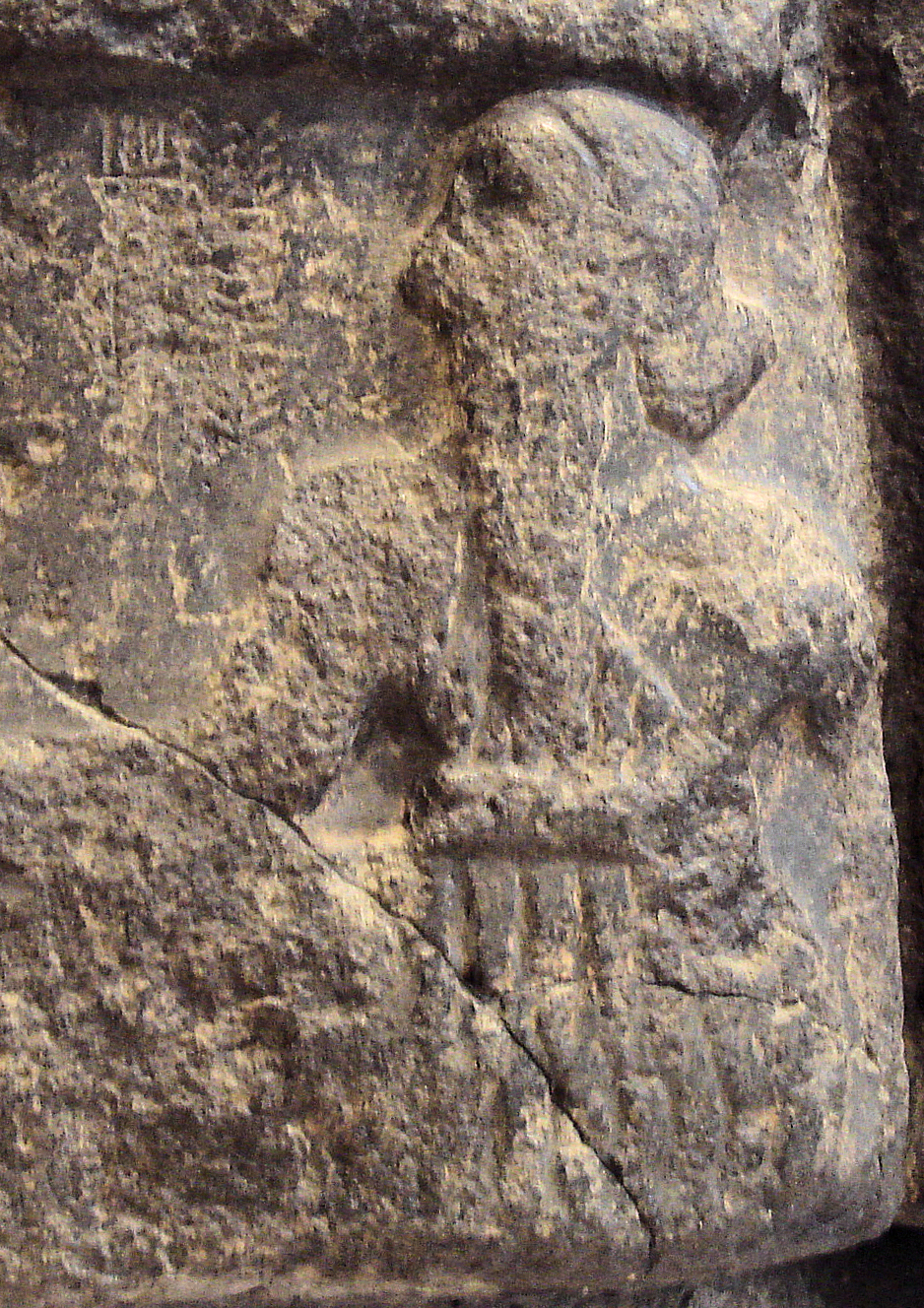
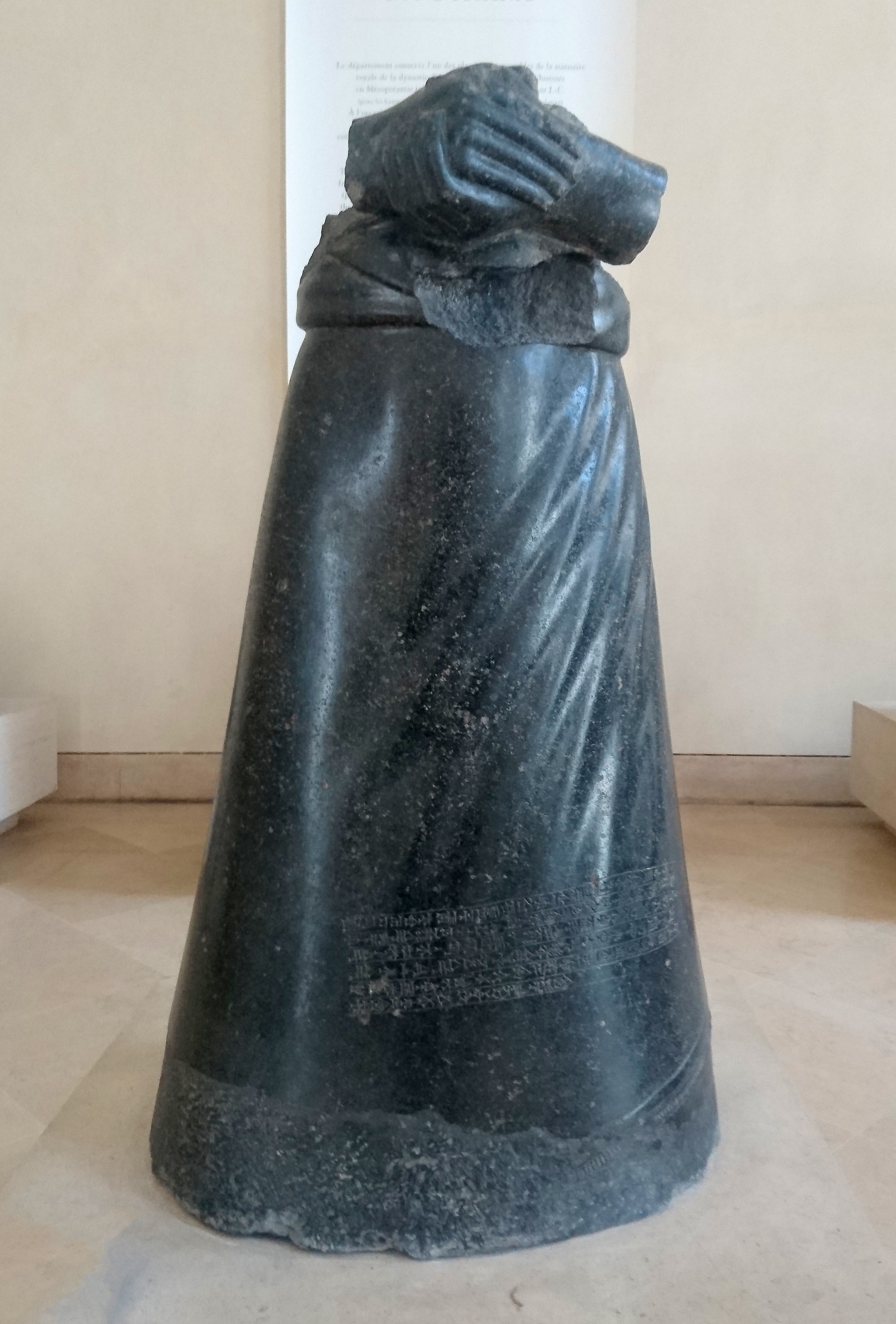
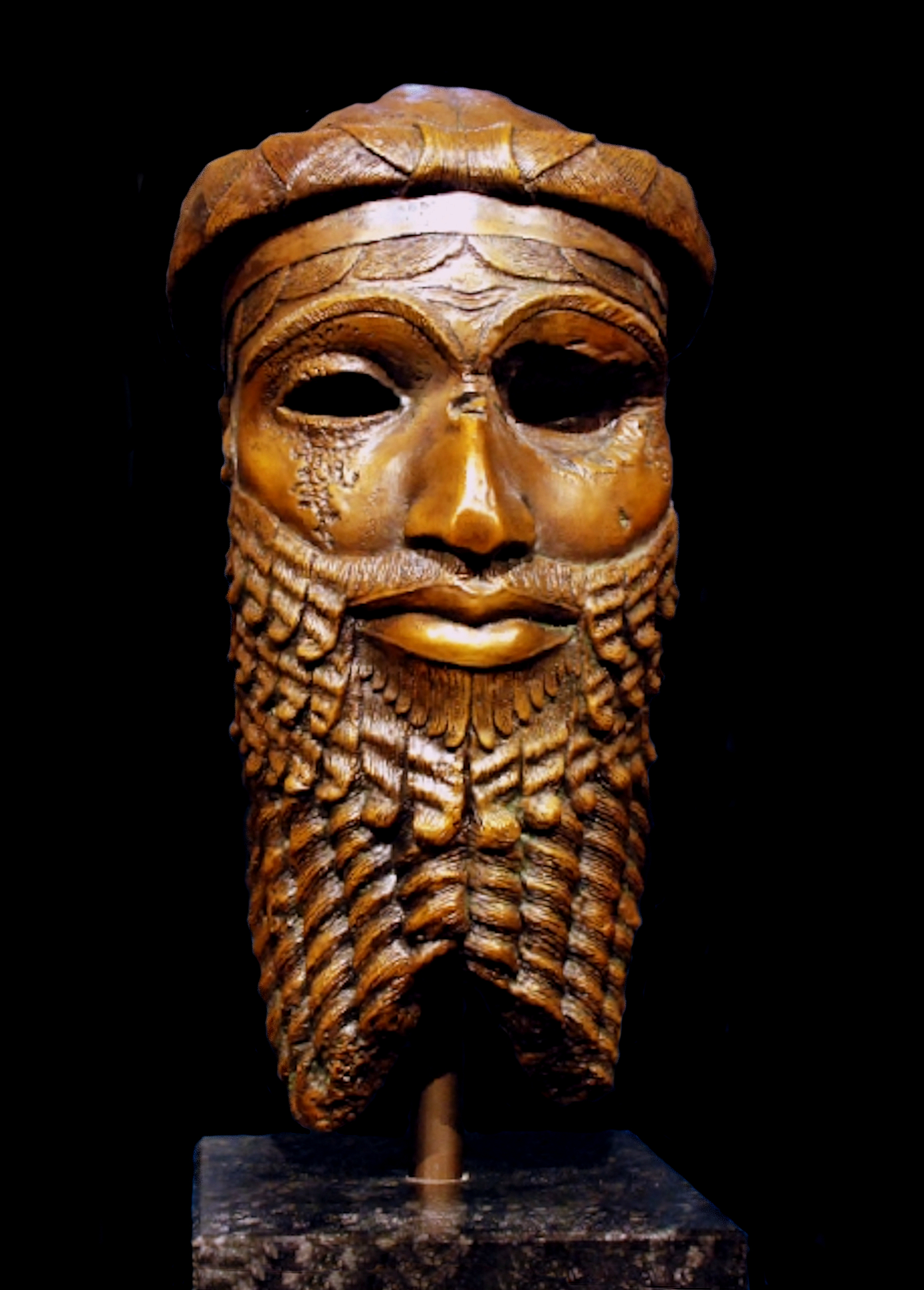
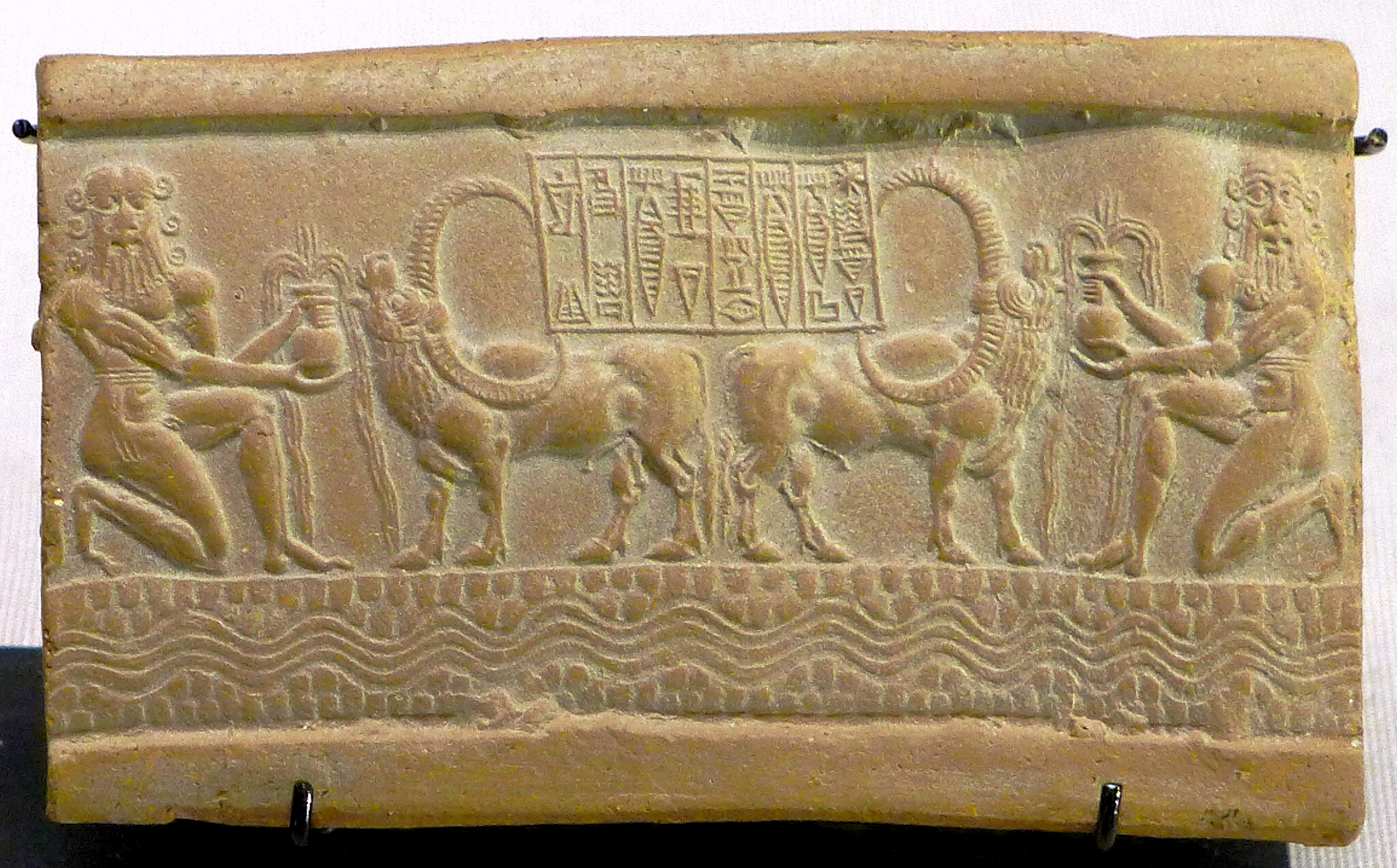
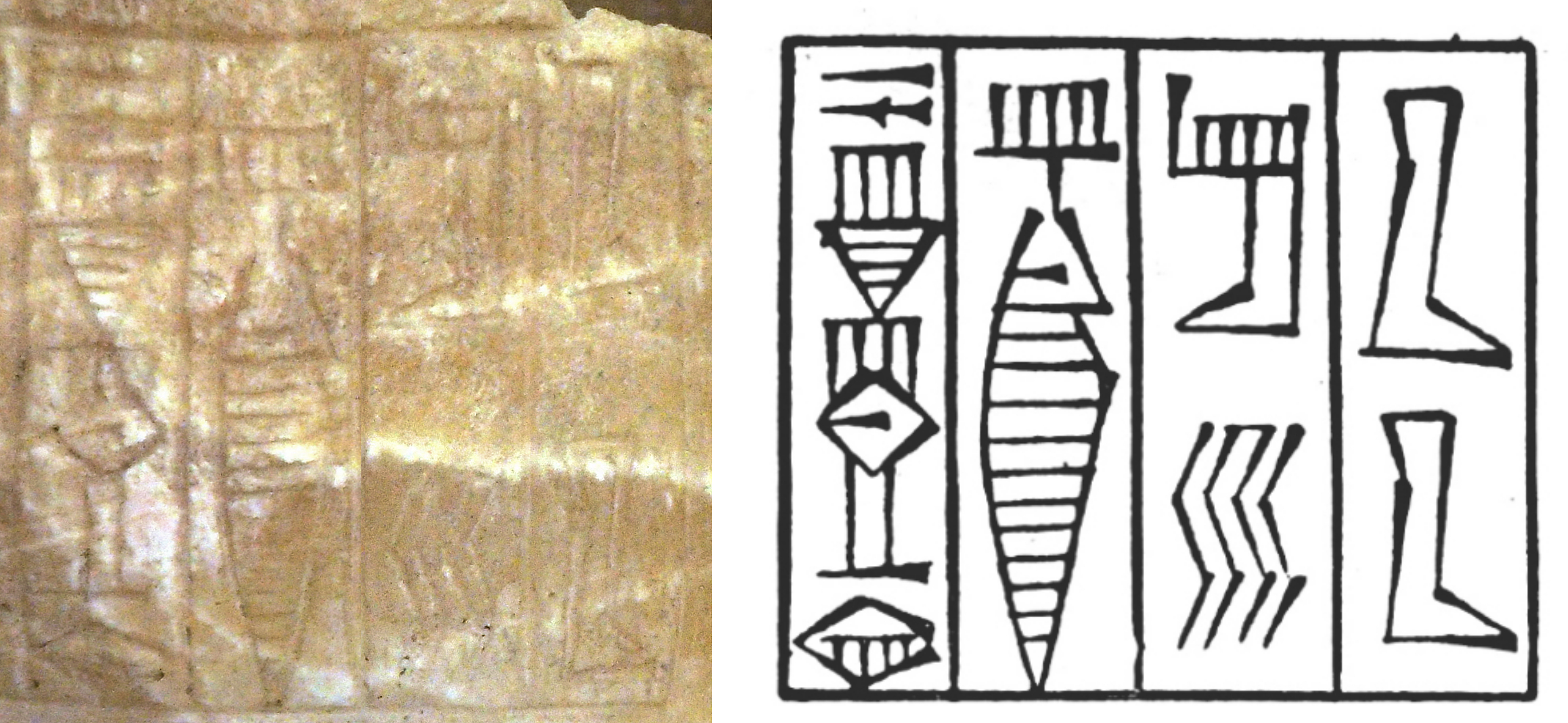
| Ruler | Epithet | Length of reign | Approx. dates | Comments |
|---|---|---|---|---|
| Sargon of Akkad | "whose father was a gardener, the cupbearer of Ur-Zababa, became king, the king of Agade, who built Agade" | 56 years | c. 2270–2215 BC (short) | Defeated Lugal-zage-si of Uruk, took over Sumer, and began the Akkadian Empire |
| Rimush | "the son of Sargon" | 9 years | c. 2214–2206 BC (short) |
| Manishtushu | "the older brother of Rimush, the son of Sargon" | 15 years | c. 2205–2191 BC (short) |
| Naram-Sin of Akkad | "the son of Man-ishtishu" | 56 years | c. 2190–2154 BC (short) |
| Shar-Kali-Sharri | "the son of Naram-Sin" | 24 years | c. 2153–2129 BC (short) |
"Then who was king? Who was not the king?"
| Irgigi; Imi; Nanum; Ilulu | | 4 years | c. 2128–2125 BC (short) |
| Dudu of Akkad | | 21 years | c. 2125–2104 BC (short) |
| Shu-Durul | "the son of Dudu" | 15 years | c. 2104–2083 BC (short) | Akkad falls to the Gutians |
"Then Agade was defeated and the kingship was taken to Unug (Uruk)."

Fourth dynasty of Uruk

(Possibly rulers of lower Mesopotamia contemporary with the Dynasty of Akkad)

| Ruler | Epithet | Length of reign | Approx. dates | Comments |
|---|---|---|---|---|
| Ur-ningin | | 7 years | c. 2091? – 2061? BC (short) | Known from inscriptions. |
| Ur-gigir | "the son of Ur-ningin" | 6 years | | Known from inscriptions. |
| Kuda | | 6 years |
| Puzur-ili | | 5 years |
| Ur-Utu (or Lugal-melem) | ("the son of Ur-gigir")* | 25 years |
"Unug was defeated and the kingship was taken to the army of Gutium."

The Second dynasty of Lagash (before c. 2093–2046 BC (short)) is not mentioned in the King List, though it is well known from inscriptions.

Gutian rule

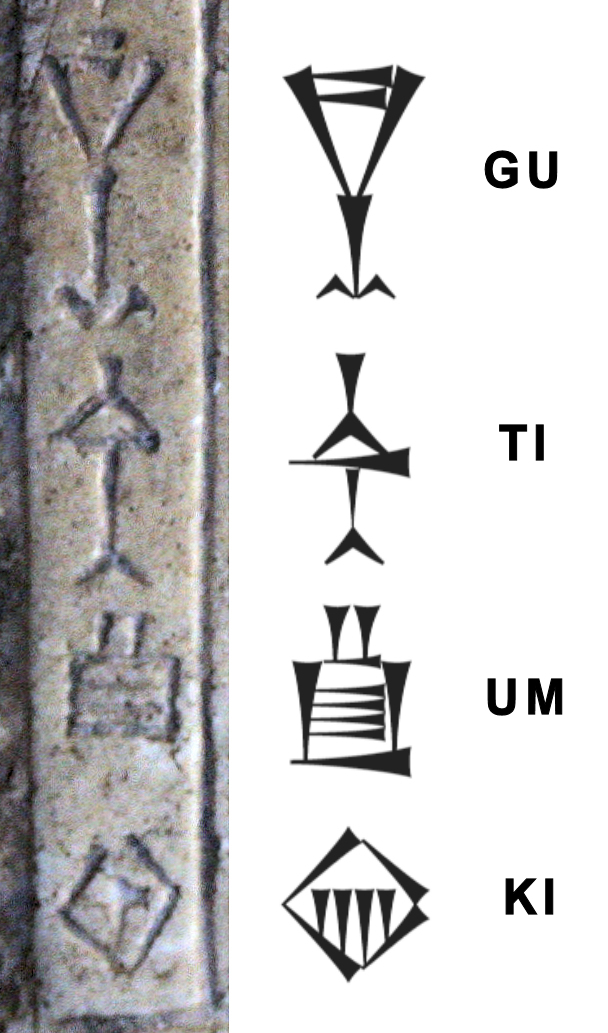
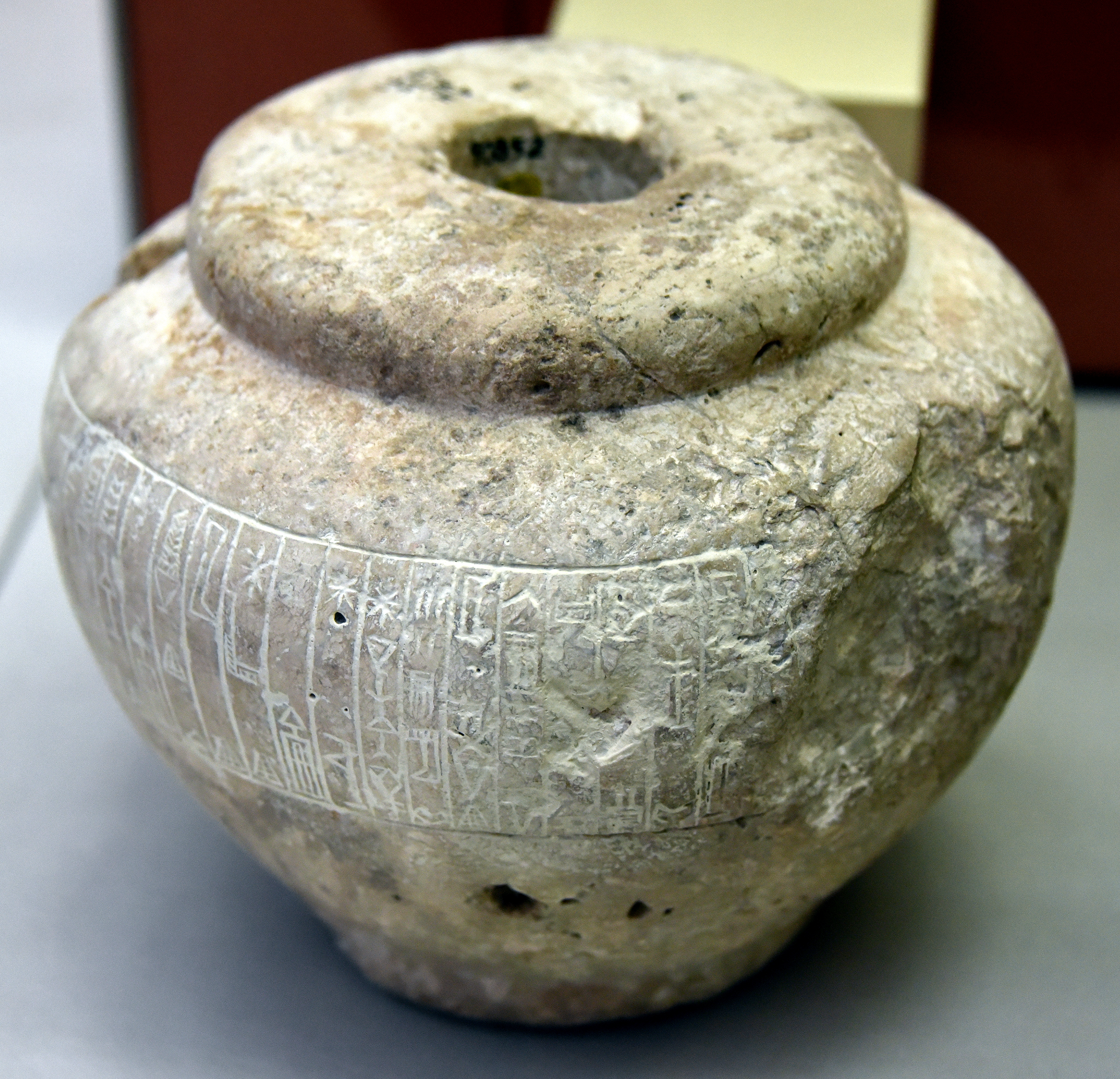
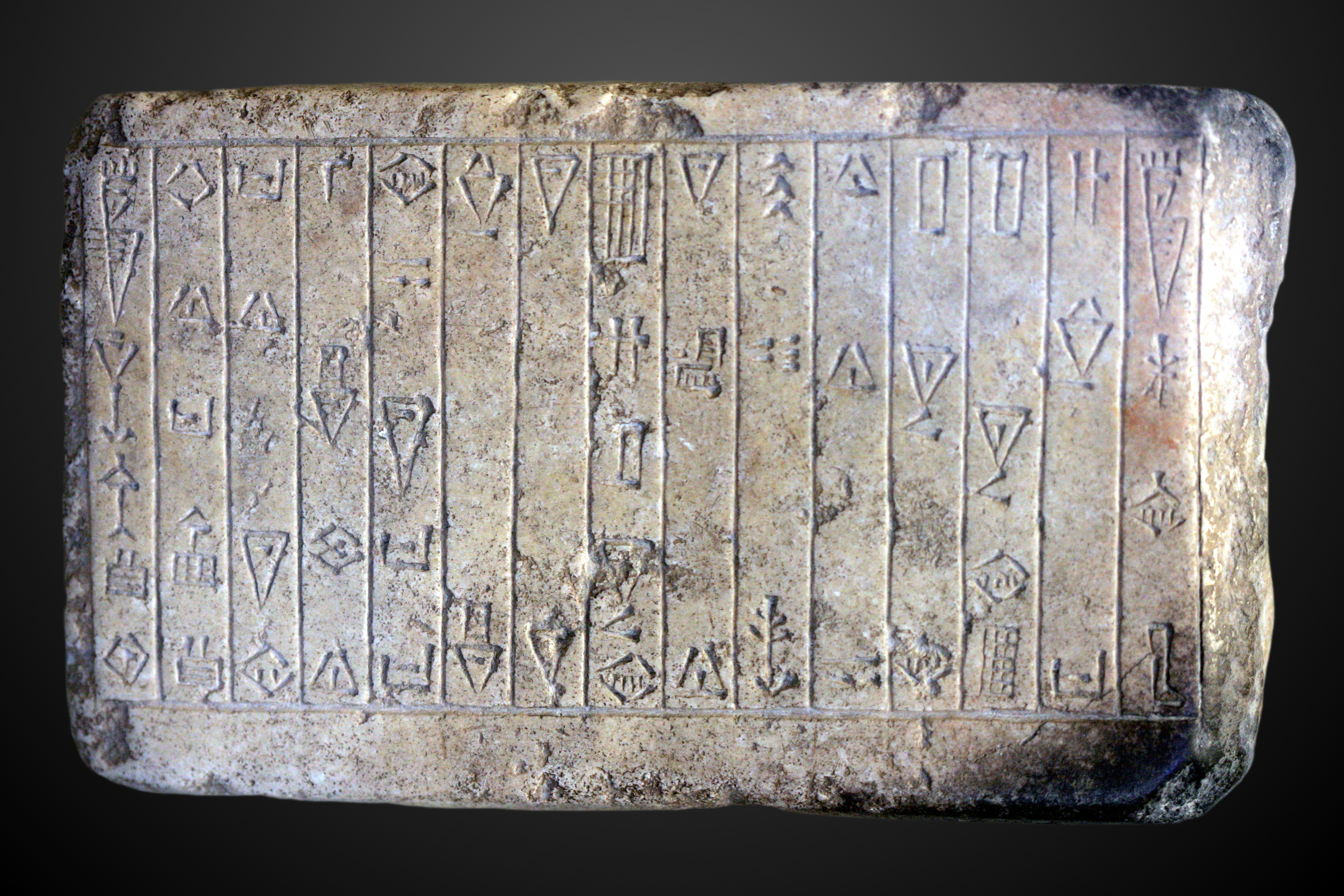
| Ruler | Length of reign | Approx. dates | Comments |
|---|---|---|---|
"In the army of Gutium, at first no king was famous; they were their own kings and ruled thus for 3 years."
| Inkišuš | 6 years | c. 2147–2050 BC (short) | Mention of the Gutian dynasty of Sumer in the tablet of Lugalanatum (𒄖𒋾𒌝𒆠, gu-ti-um^{KI}) |
| Sarlagab (or Zarlagab) | 6 years | | Mention of the Gutian dynasty of Sumer in the tablet of Lugalanatum (𒄖𒋾𒌝𒆠, gu-ti-um^{KI}) |
| Shulme (or Yarlagash) | 6 years | | Mention of the Gutian dynasty of Sumer in the tablet of Lugalanatum (𒄖𒋾𒌝𒆠, gu-ti-um^{KI}) |
| Elulmeš (or Silulumeš or Silulu) | 6 years | | Mention of the Gutian dynasty of Sumer in the tablet of Lugalanatum (𒄖𒋾𒌝𒆠, gu-ti-um^{KI}) |
| Inimabakeš (or Duga) | 5 years | | Mention of the Gutian dynasty of Sumer in the tablet of Lugalanatum (𒄖𒋾𒌝𒆠, gu-ti-um^{KI}) |
| Igešauš (or Ilu-An) | 6 years | | Mention of the Gutian dynasty of Sumer in the tablet of Lugalanatum (𒄖𒋾𒌝𒆠, gu-ti-um^{KI}) |
| Yarlagab | 3 years | | Mention of the Gutian dynasty of Sumer in the tablet of Lugalanatum (𒄖𒋾𒌝𒆠, gu-ti-um^{KI}) |
| Ibate of Gutium | 3 years | | Mention of the Gutian dynasty of Sumer in the tablet of Lugalanatum (𒄖𒋾𒌝𒆠, gu-ti-um^{KI}) |
| Yarla (or Yarlangab) | 3 years | | Mention of the Gutian dynasty of Sumer in the tablet of Lugalanatum (𒄖𒋾𒌝𒆠, gu-ti-um^{KI}) |
| Kurum | 1 year | | Mention of the Gutian dynasty of Sumer in the tablet of Lugalanatum (𒄖𒋾𒌝𒆠, gu-ti-um^{KI}) |
| Apilkin | 3 years | | Mention of the Gutian dynasty of Sumer in the tablet of Lugalanatum (𒄖𒋾𒌝𒆠, gu-ti-um^{KI}) |
| La-erabum | 2 years | | mace head inscription |
| Irarum | 2 years |
| Ibranum | 1 year |
| Hablum | 2 years |
| Puzur-Suen | 7 years | | "the son of Hablum" |
| Yarlaganda | 7 years | | foundation inscription at Umma |
| Unknown | 7 years | | Si'um or Si-u? — foundation inscription at Umma |
| Tirigan | 40 days | | defeated by Utu-hengal of Uruk |
"Then the army of Gutium was defeated and the kingship taken to Unug (Uruk)."

Fifth dynasty of Uruk

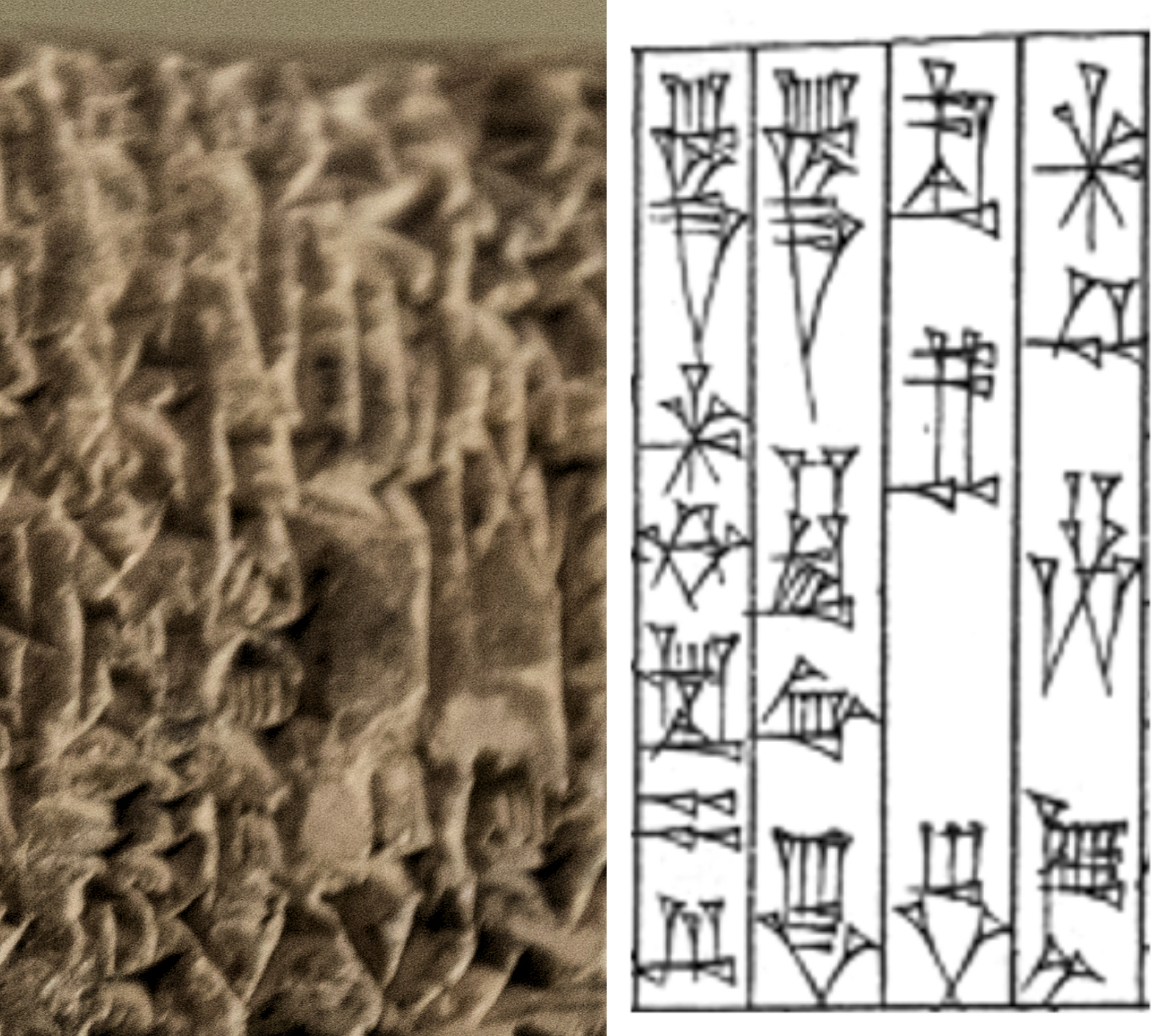
| Ruler | Epithet | Length of reign | Approx. dates | Comments |
|---|---|---|---|---|
| Utu-hengal | | conflicting dates (427 years / 26 years / 7 years) | c. 2055–2048 BC (short) | defeats Tirigan and the Gutians, appoints Ur-Namma governor of Ur |

Third dynasty of Ur

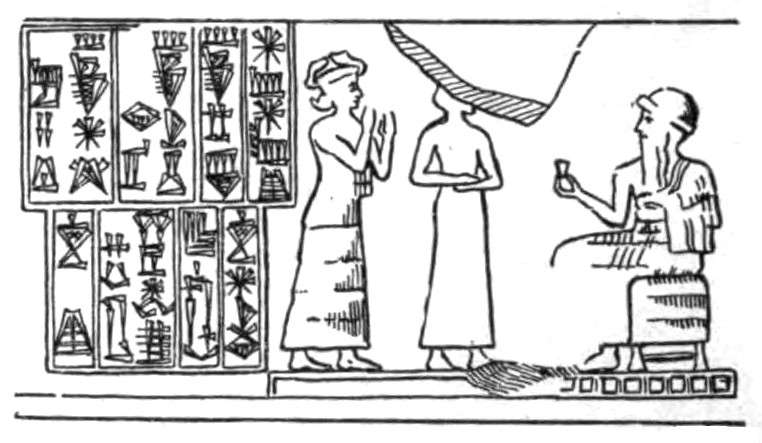
| Ruler | Epithet | Length of reign | Approx. dates | Comments |
|---|---|---|---|---|
| Ur-Namma (Ur-Nammu) | "the son of Utu-Hengal" | 18 years | c. 2047–2030 BC (short) | defeats Nammahani of Lagash; contemporary of Utu-hengal of Uruk |
| Shulgi | "the son of Ur-Namma" | 48 years | c. 2029–1982 BC (short) | possible lunar/solar eclipse 2005 BC |
| Amar-Suena | "the son of Shulgi" | 9 years | c. 1981–1973 BC (short) |
| Shu-Suen | "the son of Amar-Suena" | 9 years | c. 1972–1964 BC (short) |
| Ibbi-Suen | "the son of Shu-Suen" | 24 years | c. 1963–1940 BC (short) |
"Then Urim was defeated. The very foundation of Sumer was torn out. The kingship was taken to Isin."

Dynasty of Isin

Independent Amorite states in lower Mesopotamia. The Dynasty of Larsa (c. 1961–1674 BC (short)) from this period is not mentioned in the King List.

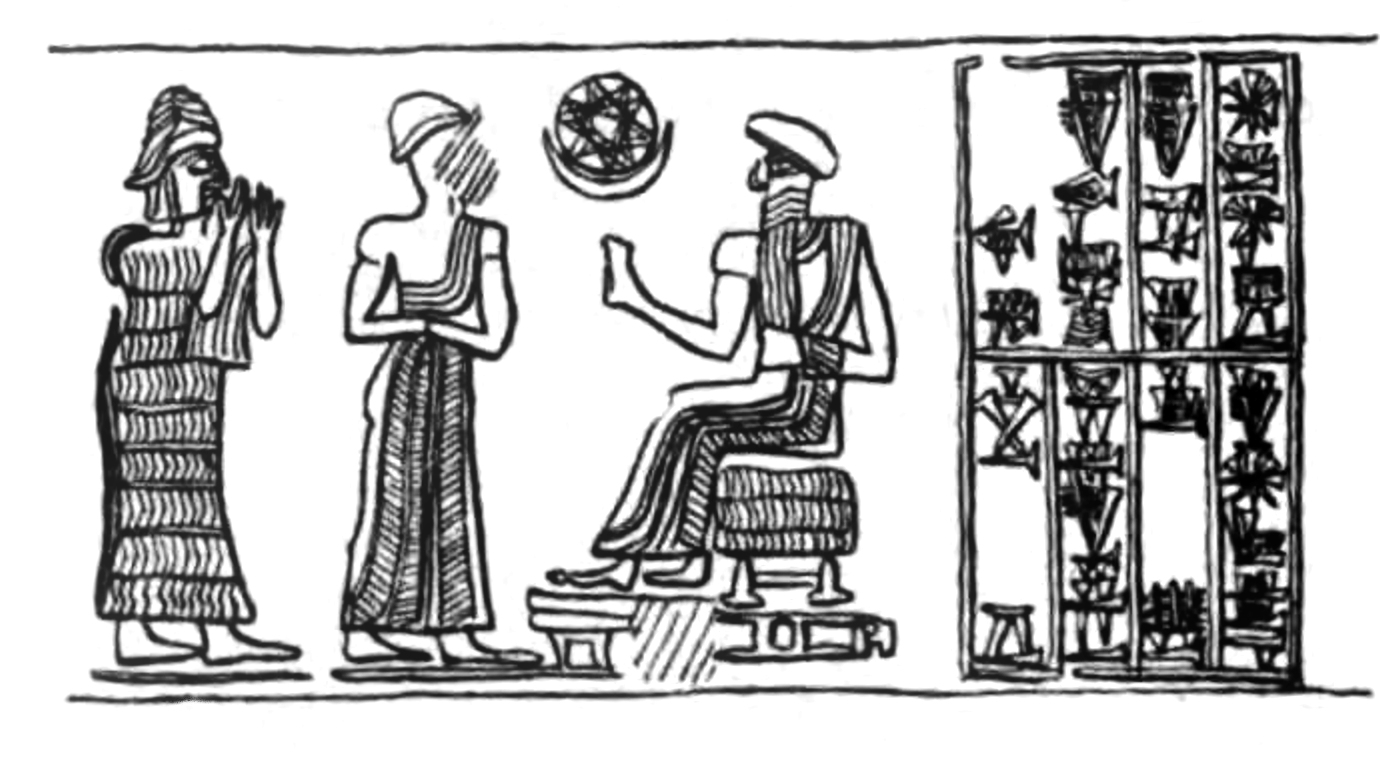
| Ruler | Epithet | Length of reign | Approx. dates | Comments |
|---|---|---|---|---|
| Ishbi-Erra | | 33 years | c. 1953–1920 BC (short) | contemporary of Ibbi-Suen of Ur |
| Shu-Ilishu | "the son of Ishbi-Erra" | 20 years |
| Iddin-Dagan | "the son of Shu-ilishu" | 20 years |
| Ishme-Dagan | "the son of Iddin-Dagan" | 20 years |
| Lipit-Eshtar | "the son of Ishme-Dagan (or Iddin-Dagan)" | 11 years | | contemporary of Gungunum of Larsa |
| Ur-Ninurta | ("the son of Ishkur, may he have years of abundance, a good reign, and a sweet life")* | 28 years | | Contemporary of Abisare of Larsa |
| Bur-Suen | "the son of Ur-Ninurta" | 21 years |
| Lipit-Enlil | "the son of Bur-Suen" | 5 years |
| Erra-imitti | | 8 years | | He appointed his gardener, Enlil-Bani, substitute king and then suddenly died. |
| Enlil-bani | | 24 years | | contemporary of Sumu-la-El of Babylon. He was Erra-imitti's gardener and was appointed substitute king, to serve as a scapegoat and then sacrificed, but remained on the throne when Erra－imitti suddenly died. |
| Zambiya | | 3 years | | contemporary of Sin-Iqisham of Larsa |
| Iter-pisha | | 4 years |
| Ur-du-kuga | | 4 years |
| Suen-magir | | 11 years |
| (Damiq-ilishu)* | ("the son of Suen-magir")* | (23 years)* |

* These epithets or names are not included in all versions of the king list.

== See also ==
- Chronology of the ancient Near East
- History of Sumer
- List of Mesopotamian dynasties
