= Ibranum =

- King of Sumer
- Reign: fl. late 3rd millennium BCE
- Predecessor: Irarum
- Successor: Hablum
- Gutian language: Ibranum
- House: Gutian Dynasty of Sumer

Ibranum (fl. late 3rd millennium BCE) was the 14th Gutian ruler of the Gutian Dynasty of Sumer mentioned on the "Sumerian King List" (SKL). According to the SKL: Ibranum was the successor of Irarum. Hablum then succeeded Ibranum (likewise according to the SKL.)

Preceded by Irarum	King of Sumer fl. late 3rd millennium BCE	Succeeded by Hablum

== See also ==
- History of Sumer
- List of Mesopotamian dynasties
