= Hablum =

- King of Sumer
- Reign: fl. late 3rd millennium BCE
- Predecessor: Ibranum
- Successor: Puzur-Suen
- House: Gutian Dynasty of Sumer

Hablum (fl. late 3rd millennium BCE) was the 15th Gutian ruler of the Gutian Dynasty of Sumer mentioned on the "Sumerian King List" (SKL). According to the SKL: Hablum was the successor of Ibranum. Puzur-Suen then succeeded Hablum (likewise according to the SKL.)

Preceded by Ibranum	King of Sumer fl. late 3rd millennium BCE	Succeeded by Puzur-Suen

== See also ==
- History of Sumer
- List of Mesopotamian dynasties
