= Irarum =

- King of Sumer
- Reign: fl. late 3rd millennium BCE
- Predecessor: La-erabum
- Successor: Ibranum
- House: Gutian Dynasty of Sumer

Irarum (fl. late 3rd millennium BCE) was the 13th Gutian ruler of the Gutian Dynasty of Sumer mentioned on the "Sumerian King List" (SKL). According to the SKL: Irarum was the successor of La-erabum. Ibranum then succeeded Irarum (likewise according to the SKL.)

Preceded by La-erabum	King of Sumer fl. late 3rd millennium BCE	Succeeded by Ibranum

== See also ==
- History of Sumer
- List of Mesopotamian dynasties
