= Puzur-Suen (Gutian king) =

- King of Sumer
- Reign: fl. late 3rd millennium BCE
- Predecessor: Hablum
- Successor: Yarlaganda
- House: Gutian Dynasty of Sumer

Puzur-Suen (fl. late 3rd millennium BCE) was the 16th Gutian ruler of the Gutian Dynasty of Sumer mentioned on the "Sumerian King List" (SKL). According to the SKL: Puzur-Suen was the successor of Hablum. Yarlaganda then succeeded Puzur-Suen (likewise according to the SKL.)

| Preceded by Hablum | King of Sumer fl. late 3rd millennium BCE | Succeeded by Yarlaganda |

== See also ==
- History of Sumer
- List of Mesopotamian dynasties
