= Yarlaganda =

- King of Sumer
- Reign: fl. late 3rd millennium BCE
- Predecessor: Puzur-Suen
- Successor: Si'um
- House: Gutian Dynasty of Sumer

Yarlaganda (fl. late 3rd millennium BCE) was the 17th Gutian ruler of the Gutian Dynasty of Sumer mentioned on the "Sumerian King List" (SKL). According to the SKL: Yarlaganda was the successor of Puzur-Suen. Si'um then succeeded Yarlaganda (likewise according to the SKL.).

Preceded by Puzur-Suen	King of Sumer fl. late 3rd millennium BCE	Succeeded by Si'um

== See also ==
- History of Sumer
- List of Mesopotamian dynasties
