= Utu-hengal =

- King of the four quarters of the world
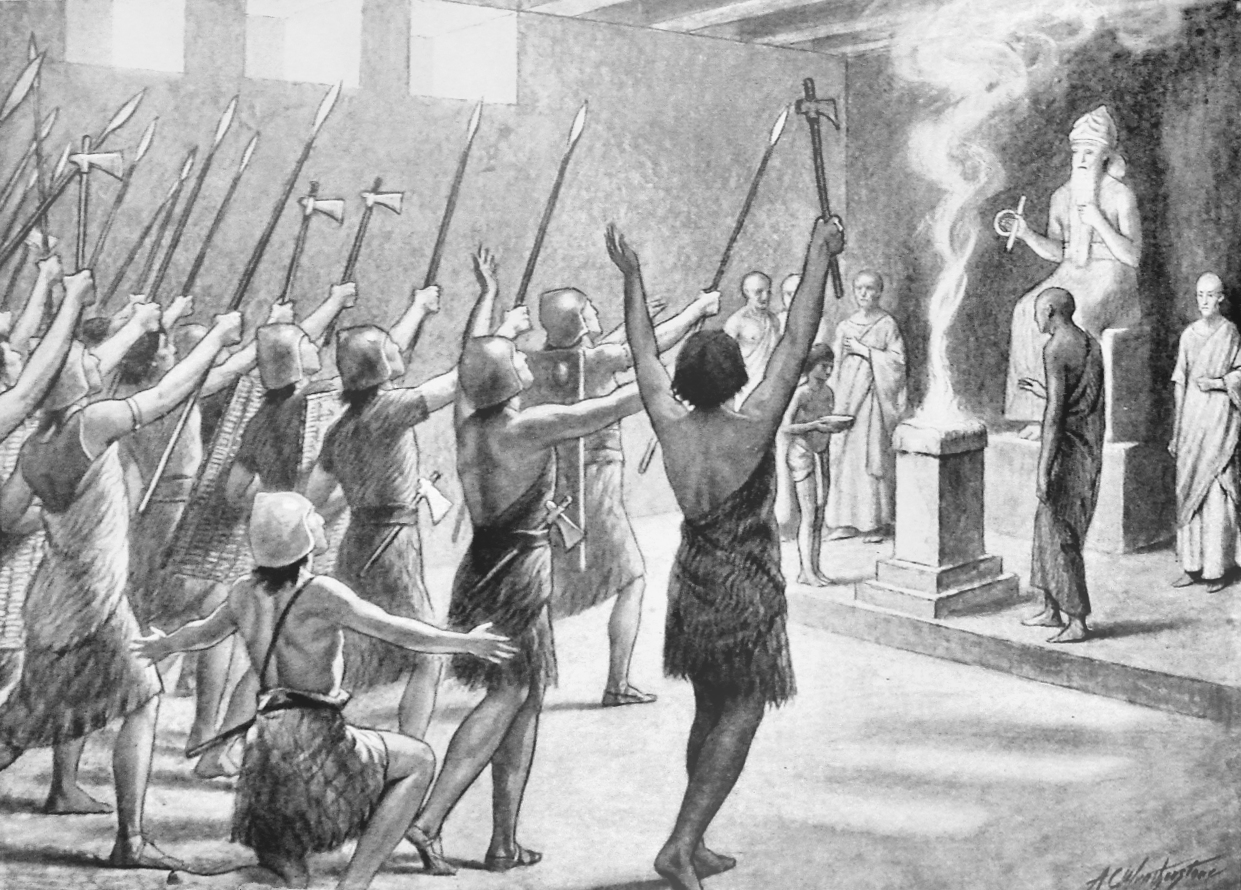
- Utu-Hengal, Prince of the Sumerian city of Uruk, praying for victory against the Gutian king Tirigan. 19th century illustration.

King of Uruk
- Reign: c. 2119 – c. 2112 BC
- Predecessor: Tirigan (Gutian Dynasty); Nam-mahani (Second Dynasty of Lagash)
- Successor: Ur-Nammu (Third dynasty of Ur)
- Died: c. 2112 BC
- Dynasty: 5th Dynasty of Uruk

Utu-hengal (Sumerian: 𒀭𒌓𒃶𒅅, ^{D}utu-ḫe₂-g̃al₂; died c. 2112 BC), also written Utu-heg̃al, Utu-heĝal, and sometimes transcribed as Utu-hegal, Utu-hejal, Utu-Khengal, was one of the first native kings of Sumer after two hundred years of Akkadian and Gutian rule, and was at the origin of the foundation of the Third Dynasty of Ur by his governor of Ur, (Note: Some sources such as the Mesopotamian Chronicles suggest Ur-Nammu was a family member of some sort, such as brother, son, or son-in-law, but no sources are definitive.) Ur-Nammu. He was officially "King of Uruk" in his inscriptions, and is therefore considered as the founder, and only member, of the "Fifth Dynasty of Uruk" (Uruk V).

== Early life ==
There are several theories regarding his background. The most common is that he was a governor of Uruk who revolted against the Gutian kings. He led the cities of Sumer against the last Gutian king Tirigan. After a battle at an unknown location, Utu-Hengal was victorious and forced Tirigan to flee back towards Gutium. Tirigan fled to the city of Dubrum (location unknown) where the people treated him kindly. However, once the people of Dubrum heard that Utu-Hengal was marching towards the city, they took Tirigan and his family prisoner. He was brought before Utu-Hengal, and agreed to leave Sumer and retreat back to Gutium.

== Reign ==
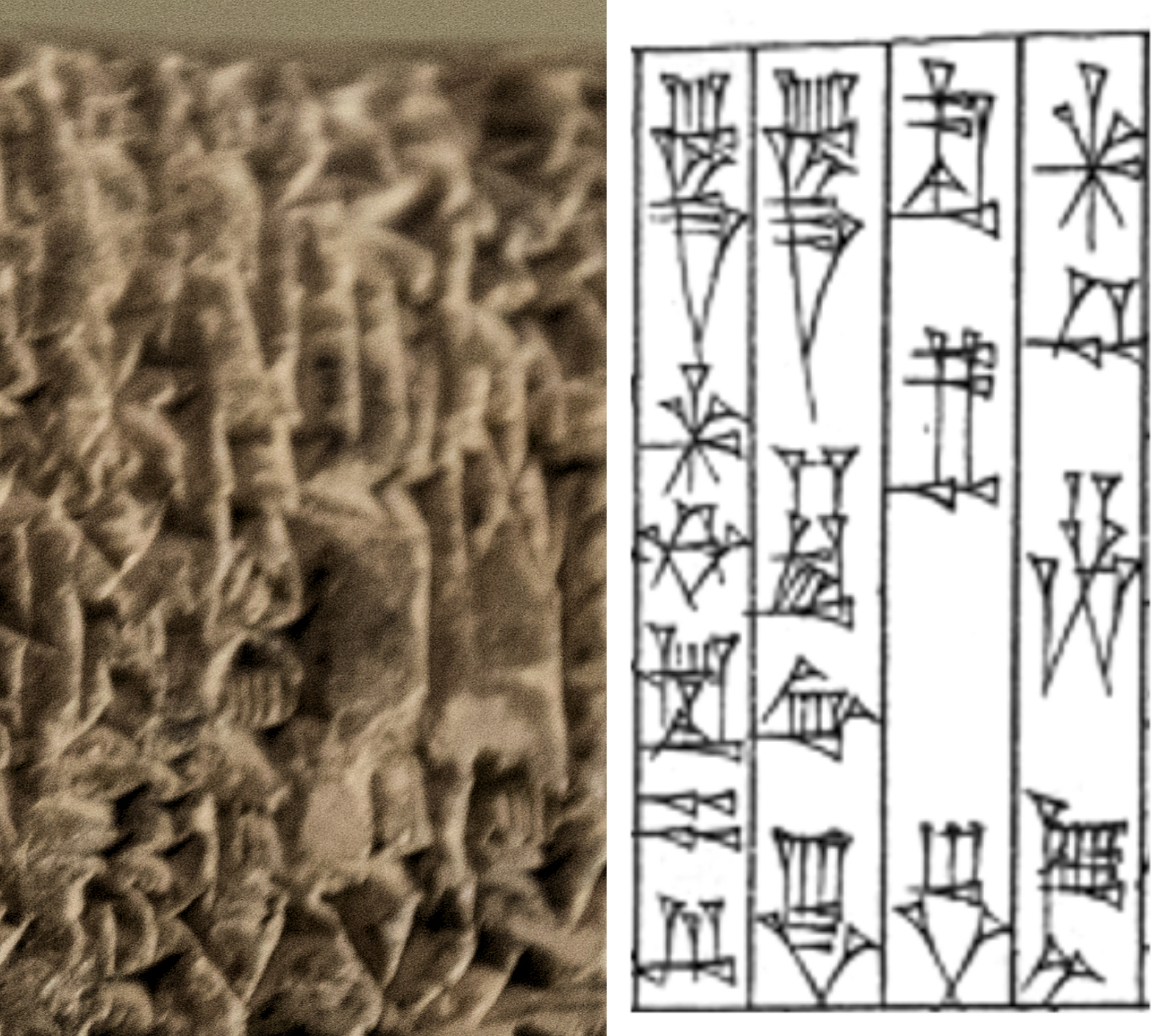
Utu-hengal name and titles on his victory stele (photograph and transcription): "Utu-hengal, the great man, King of Uruk, King of the four quarters of the world".

After defeating the Gutians, Utu-hengal established himself as the king of Sumer. In the seventh year of the kingship he died in an accident when inspecting a dam (leading some to suspect foul play), and was succeeded by the governor of Ur, Ur-Nammu, as the king of Sumer. He was thus the only king of the fifth dynasty of Uruk. In fact Sumerian people have always treated Utu-hengal's kingship and the Ur III dynasty together as a single continuous dynasty, with Utu-hengal as the founder. Utu-hengal has been praised as one of the greatest historical figures and heroes of Sumerian people.

=== Titulature ===
In his Victory Stele, Utu-hengal describes himself as:

𒀭𒌓𒃶𒅅 / 𒍑𒆗𒂵 / 𒈗𒀕𒆠𒂵 / 𒈗𒀭𒌒𒁕 𒐉𒁀
^{D}utu-he2-gal2 / nita kal-ga / lugal unu^{ki}-ga / lugal an-ub-da limmu5-ba

"Utu-hengal, the great man, King of Uruk, King of the four quarters of the world"

— Titles of Utu-hengal on his victory stele.

== Attestations ==
Utu-hengal is known through numerous inscriptions.

=== Victory stele ===
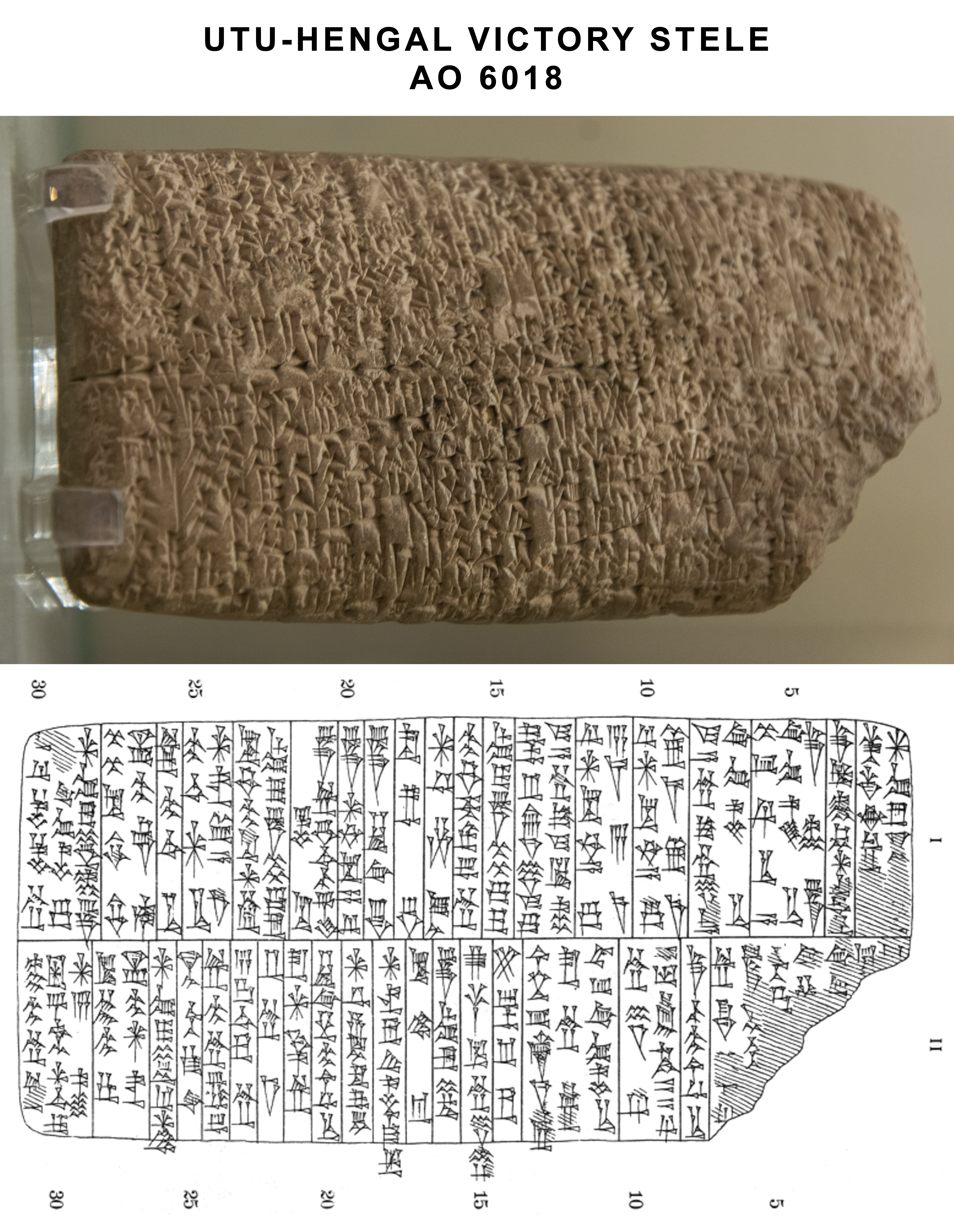
Utu-Hengal victory stele AO 6018 (photograph and transcription of the obverse). Louvre Museum

A victory stele was erected in Uruk by Utu-Hengal, a copy of which was made during the Dynasty of Isin, now in the Louvre Museum (AO 6018). The stele described the victory of Utu-Hengal over the Gutians, particularly their king Tirigan. The beginning of the inscription reads:

"Enlil! Gutium, the fanged snake of the mountain ranges, a people who acted violently against the gods, people who the kingship of Sumer to the mountains took away, who Sumer with wickedness filled, who from one with a wife his wife took away from him, who from one with a child his child took away from him, who wickedness and violence produced within the country— Enlil, the king of all the lands, to obliterate its name, Utuḫegal, the mighty man, the king of Uruk, the king of the four world quarters, the king whose utterances cannot be countermanded, Enlil, the king of all the lands, issued to him a command about this. To Inanna his lady he went and prayed to her, (saying) "My lady, lioness of battle, who the foreign lands batters, Enlil, the kingship of Sumer to return to its own control he commanded me. May you be my ally." An army of many foreigners bore down upon the land everywhere. Tirigan, the king of Gutium, opened its (canal?) mouths, but no one came out against him. Both banks of the Tigris he had seized. To the south, in Sumer, the cultivated land he tied up, to the north, the roads he tied up. On the highways of the country he made tall grasses grow (....)
By the envoys of Utuḫegal Tirigan and his wife and children in Dabrum were captured. They placed fetters on his hands and put a cloth (blindfold) over his eyes. Utuḫegal before Utu made him lie at his (Utu’s) feet, and on his neck he set his foot. Gutium, the fanged snake of the mountain ranges, he made drink from the cracks in the earth."

— Victory Stele of Utu-Hengal

=== Copper-alloy vase ===
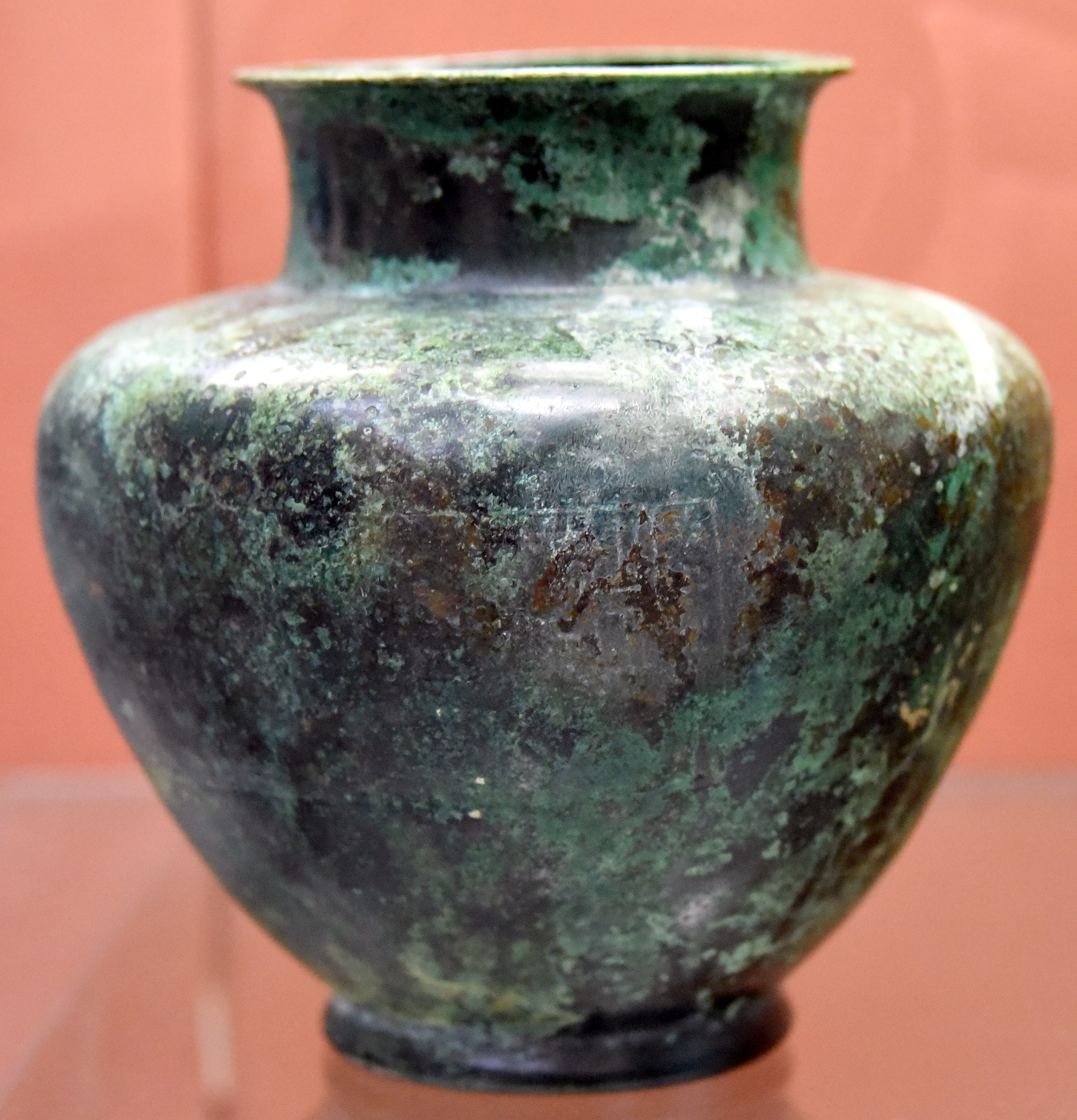
Inscribed copper-alloy vessel of Utu-hengal. British Museum.

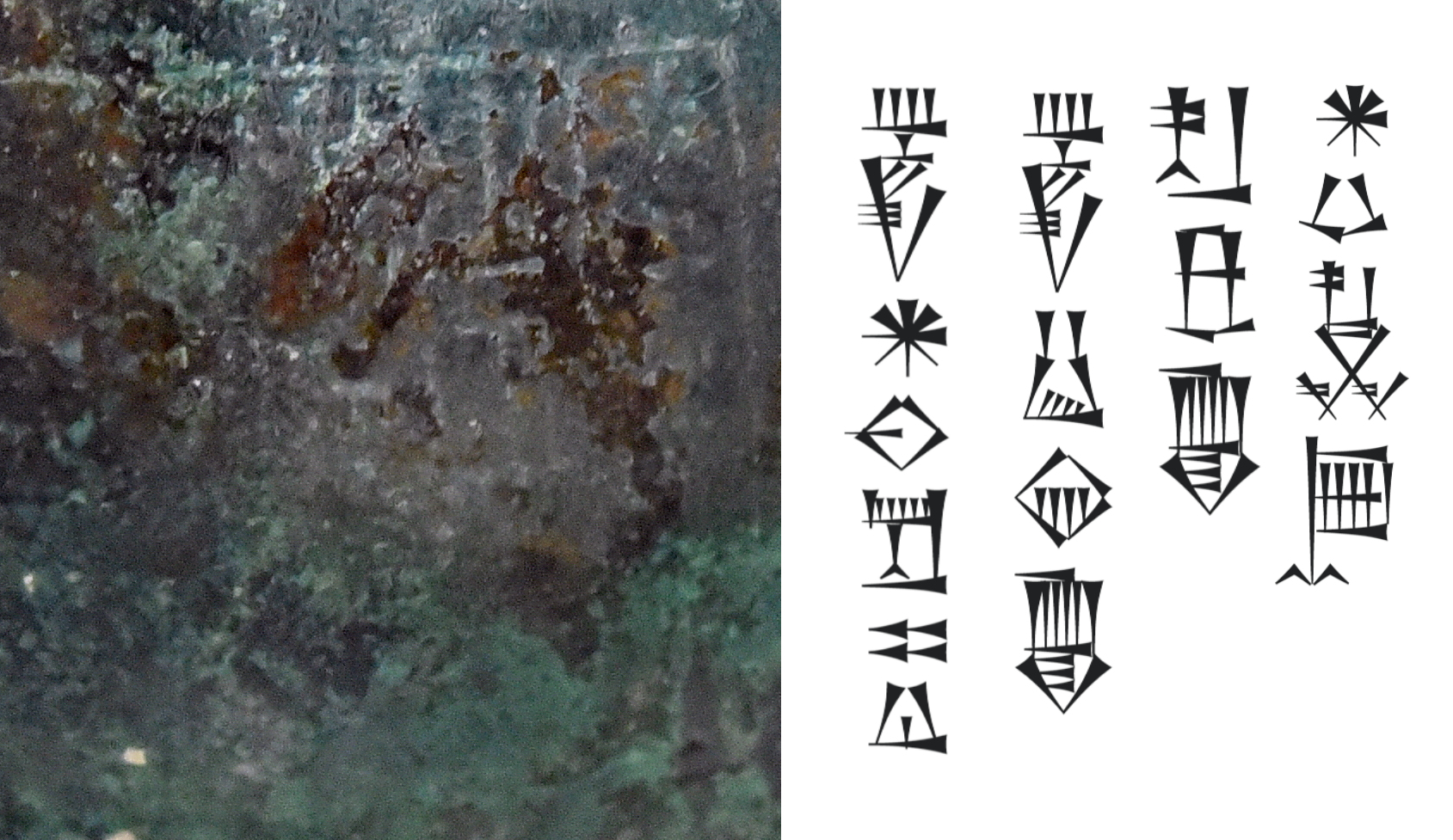
Beginning of the inscription on the vase: 𒀭𒌓𒃶𒅅 / 𒍑𒆗𒂵 / 𒈗𒀕𒆠𒂵 / 𒈗𒀭𒌒𒁕 𒐉𒁀^{D}utu-he2-gal2 / nita kal-ga / lugal unu^{ki}-ga / lugal an-ub-da limmu5-ba "Utu-hengal, the great man, King of Uruk, King of the four quarters of the world"

A copper-alloy vase, now in the British Museum (BM 1999,0731.1), has an inscription by Utu-hengal:

[This is] Utu-hegal, Powerful male, King of Uruk, King of the four quarters. Whoever erases the inscription and writes his own name instead or who, on account of this curse, has someone else take hold of it and remove it, may his reign be cut short! May his progeny be wiped out! May An, king of the gods, And Inanna, lady of Uruk, ... curse him!

— Utu-hengal copper-alloy vase inscription.

=== Stone fragment ===
Another fragmentary inscription of Utu-hengal, also in the British Museum, only mentions his name and titulature: "Utu-hengal, the great man, King of Uruk, King of the four quarters of the world".

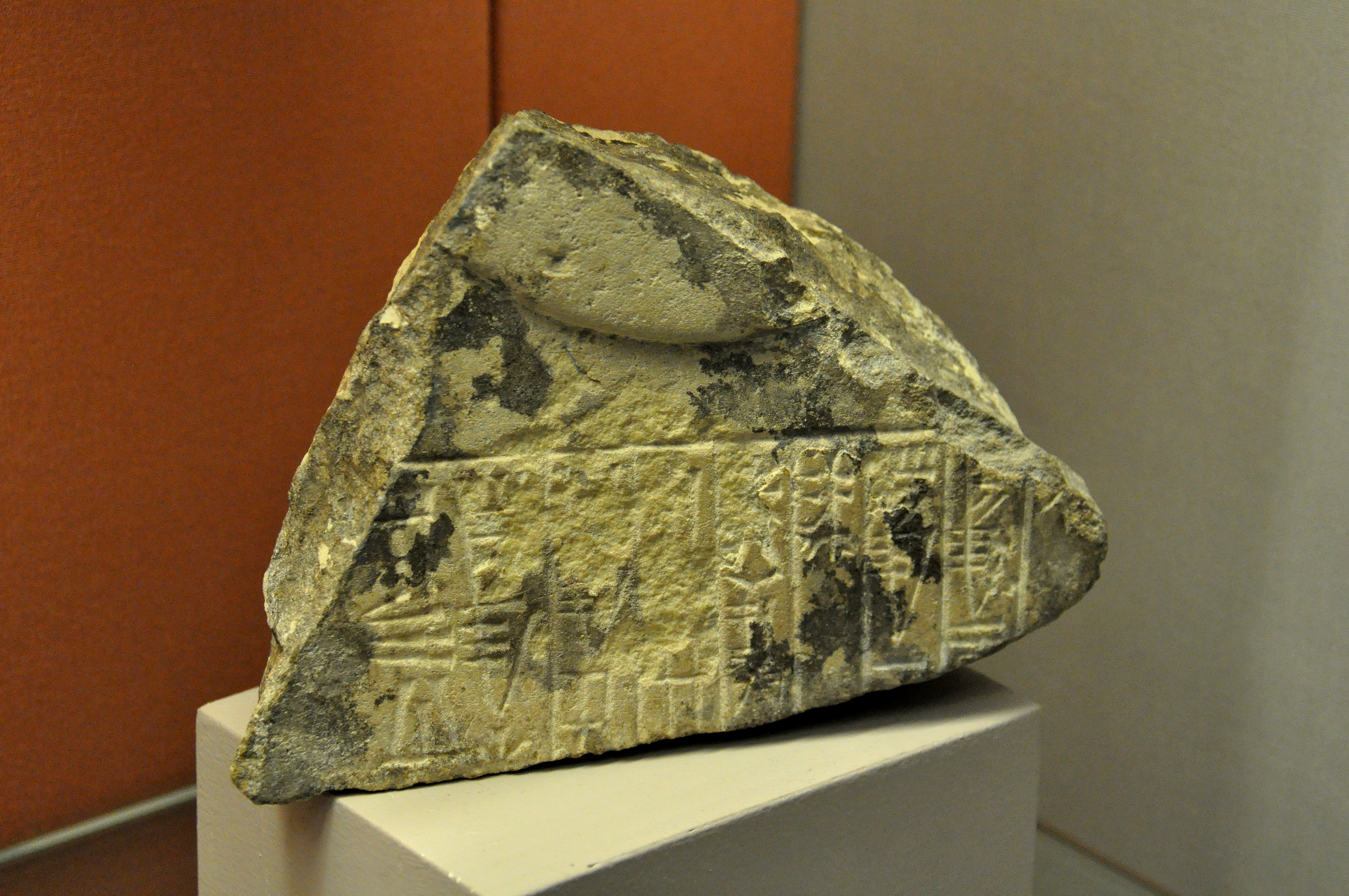
Part of a stone monument inscribed with the name of "Utu-hengal, the great man, King of Uruk, King of the four quarters of the world". Circa 2125 BC. From Ur, Iraq. The British Museum, London.

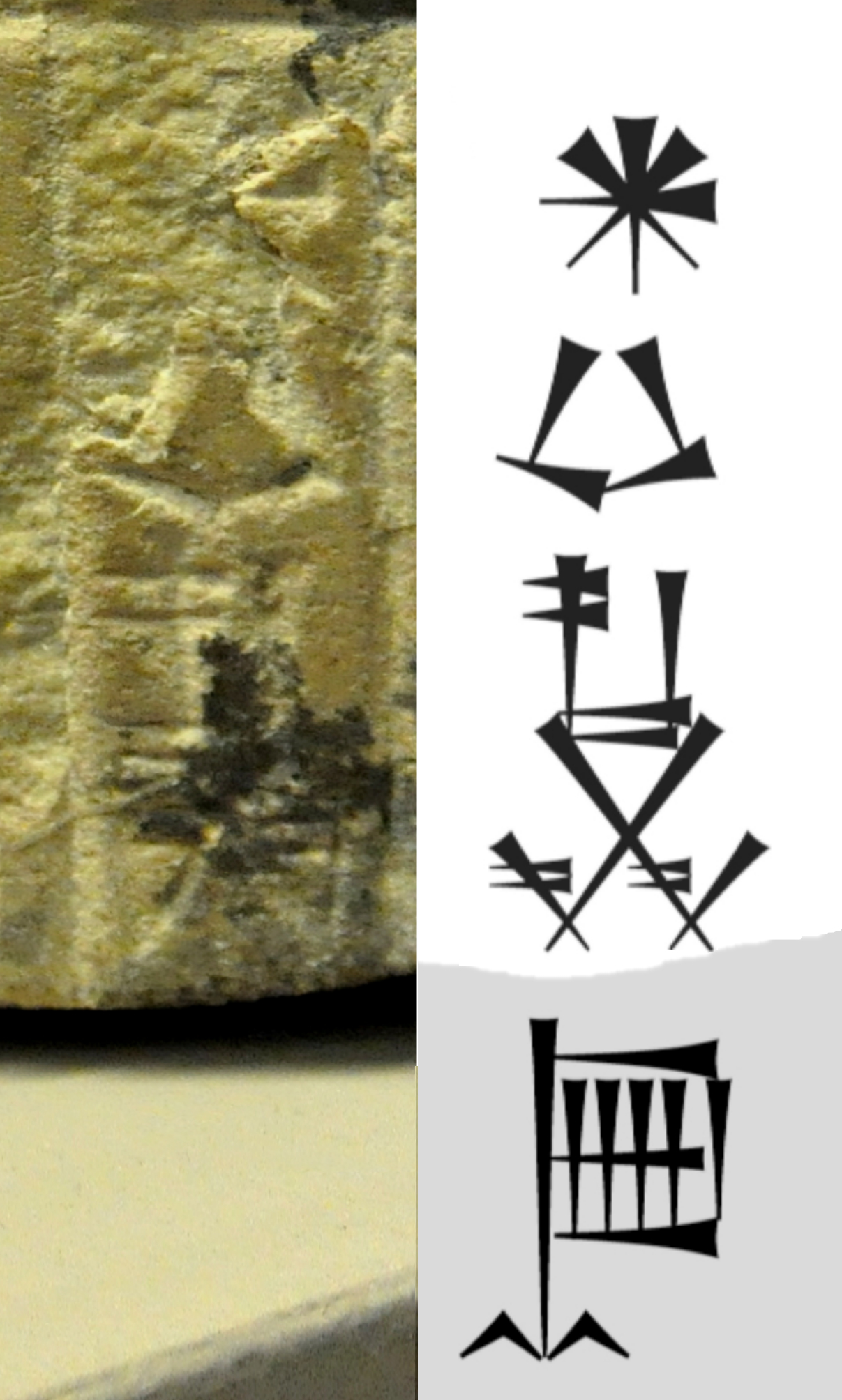
"Utu-Hen(gal)" in cuneiform

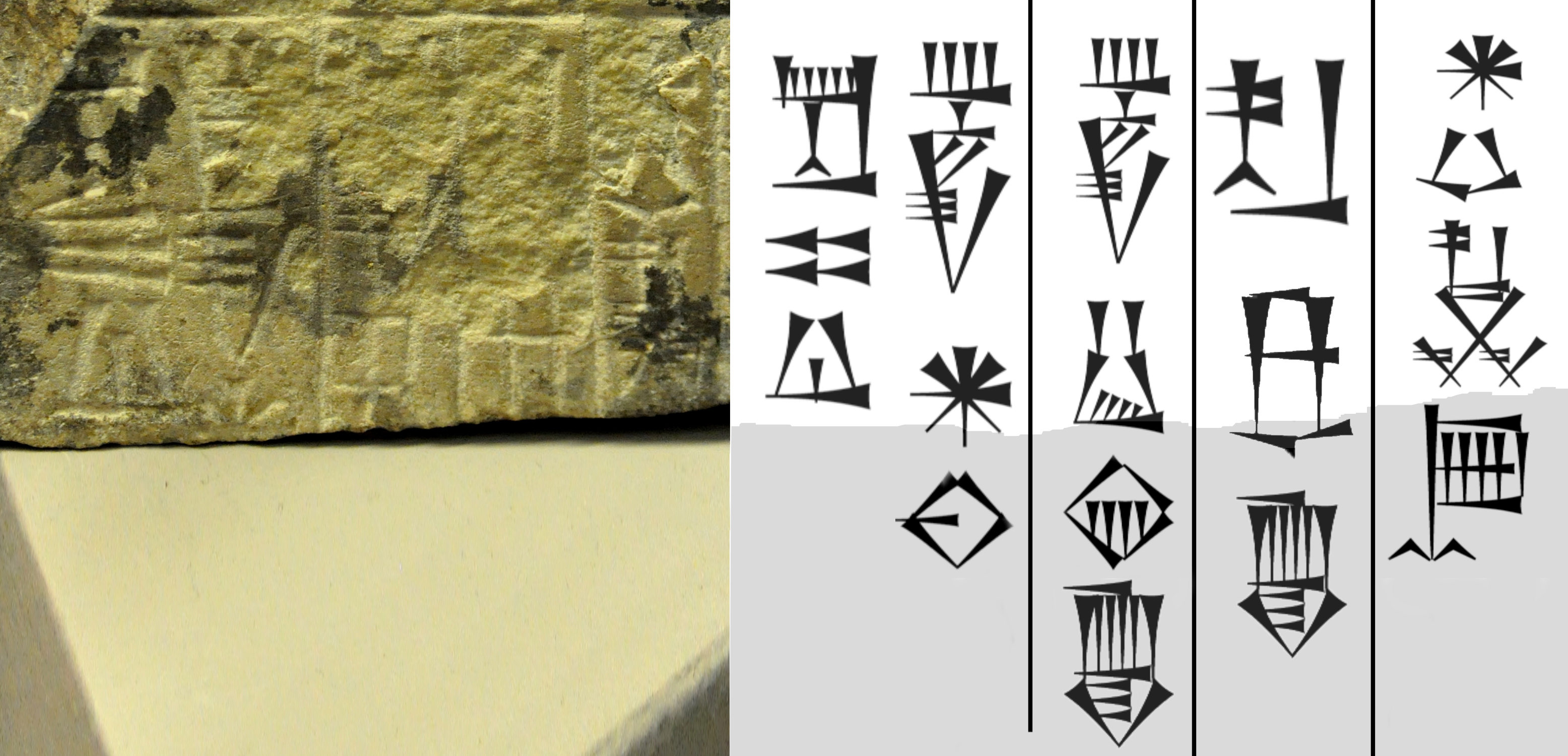
Utu-hengal inscription. "Utu-hengal, the great man, King of Uruk, King of the four quarters of the world".

Regnal titles
Preceded by Tirigan (Gutian dynasty)	King of Uruk c. 2119 – c. 2112 BC	Succeeded by Ur-Nammu (Third dynasty of Ur)
