= Si'um =

Si'um 𒋛𒅇𒌝
- King of Sumer
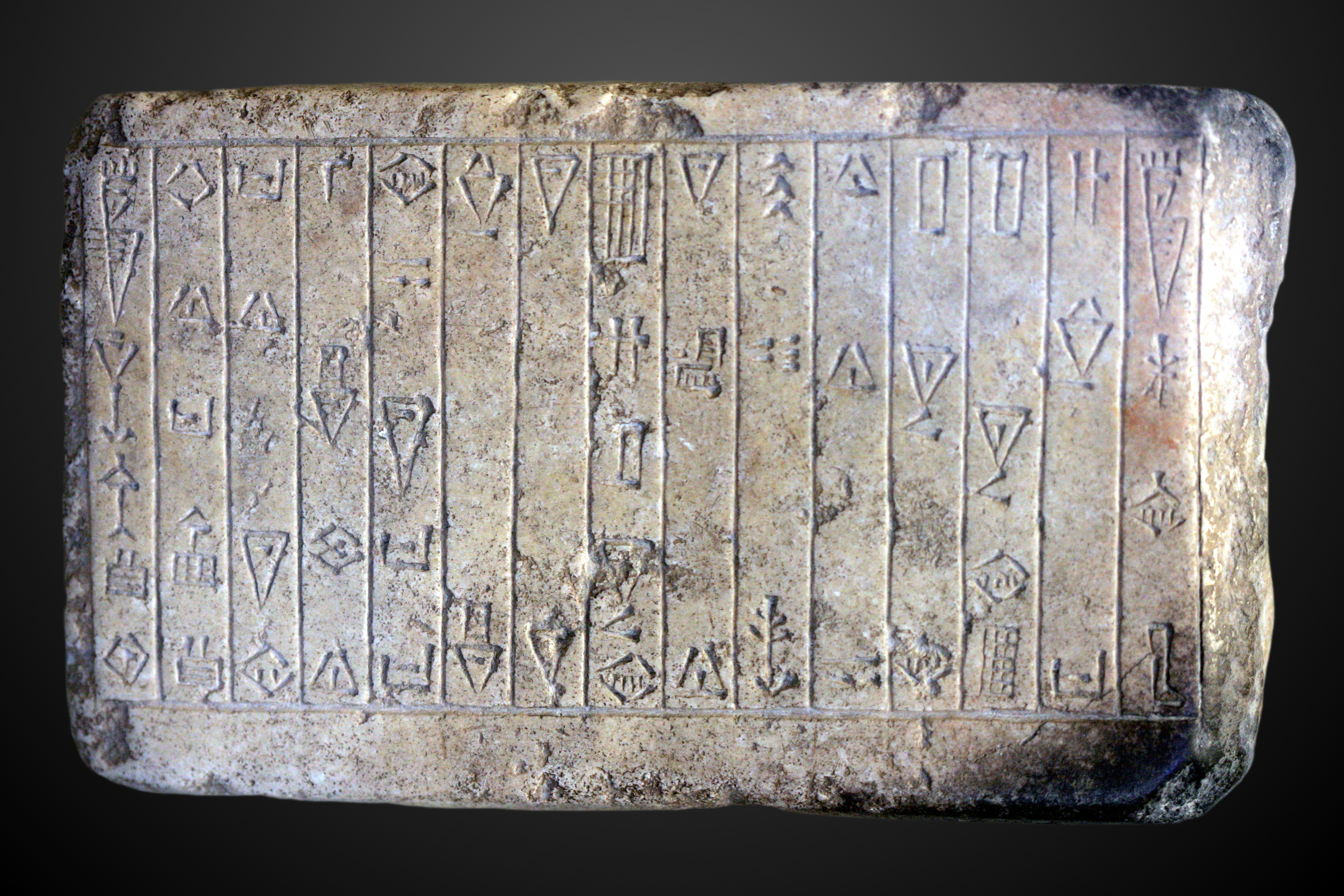
- A Gutian inscription dated c. 2130 BCE. Lugalannatum prince of Umma ... built the E.GIDRU [Sceptre] Temple at Umma, buried his foundation deposit [and] regulated the orders. At that time, Siium was king of Gutum [or Qutum]." (Collection of the Louvre Museum.)
- Reign: fl. late 3rd millennium BCE
- Predecessor: Yarlaganda
- Successor: Tirigan
- House: Gutian Dynasty of Sumer

Si'um, also Siium, or Sium (𒋛𒅇𒌝, si-u-um, fl. late 3rd millennium BCE) was the 18th Gutian ruler of the Gutian Dynasty of Sumer mentioned on the "Sumerian King List" (SKL). According to the SKL, Si'um was the successor of Yarlaganda, and the last king of the Gutians before Tirigan.

A tablet is known, dated to c. 2130 BCE, mentioning the allegiance of Lugalanatum prince of Umma to Sium, King of the Gutians.

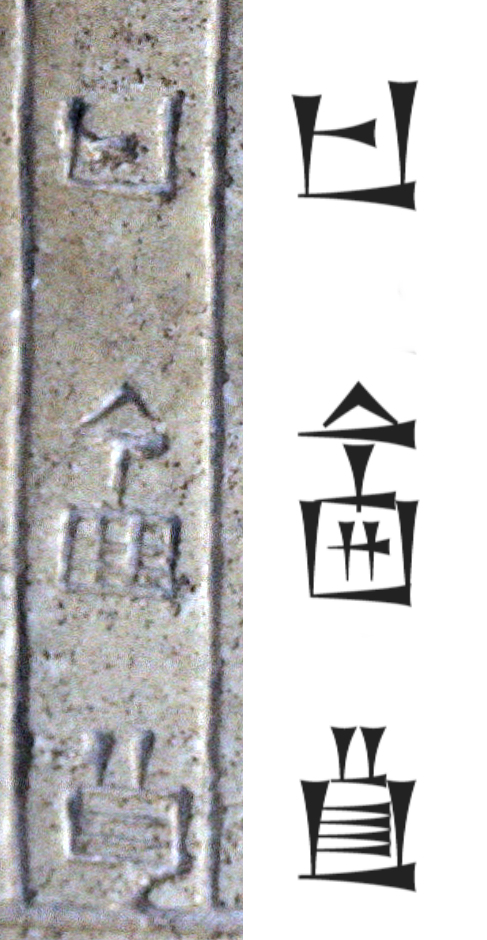
Name "Si-u-um" on the tablet, and corresponding standard Sumero-Akkadian cuneiform

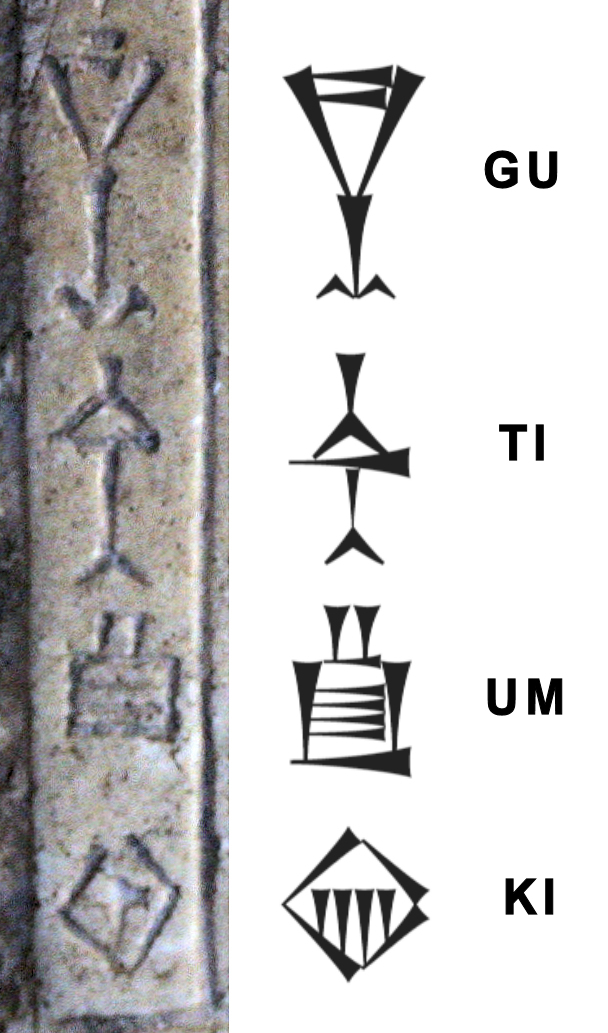
Mention of the Gutian dynasty of Sumer in the tablet (last column: 𒄖𒋾𒌝𒆠, gu-ti-um^{KI})

| Preceded by Yarlaganda | King of Sumer fl. late 3rd millennium BCE | Succeeded by Tirigan |

== See also ==
- History of Sumer
- List of Mesopotamian dynasties
