= Tirigan =

Tirigan 𒋾𒌷𒂵𒀀𒀭
- King of Sumer
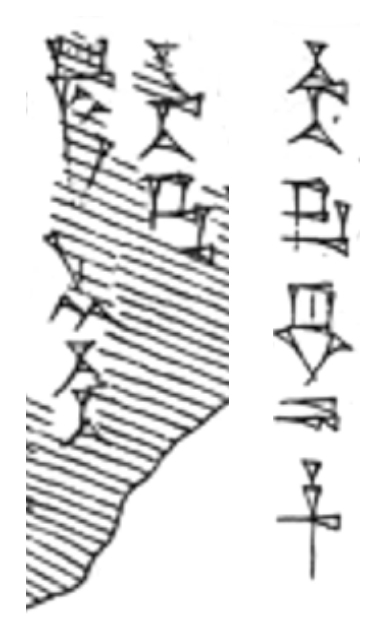
- Inscriptions Tirigan (𒋾𒌷𒂵𒀀𒀭) and Tiri (...) Lugal Gutium ("Tirigan, King of Gutium") on the Victory Stele of Utu-hengal
- Reign: fl. late 3rd millennium BCE
- Predecessor: Si'um
- Successor: Utu-hengal
- House: Gutian Dynasty of Sumer

Tirigan (fl. late 3rd millennium BCE, 𒋾𒌷𒂵𒀀𒀭, ti-ri₂-ga-a-an) was the 19th and last Gutian ruler in Sumer mentioned on the "Sumerian King List" (SKL). According to the SKL: Tirigan was the successor of Si'um. Tirigan ruled for 40 days before being defeated by Utu-hengal of Uruk, c. 2050 BC.

== Sumerian King List ==
According to the Sumerian King List:

Tirigan ruled for 40 days. 21 kings; they ruled for 124 years and 40 days. Then the army of Gutium was defeated and the kingship was taken to Uruk.

== Victory stele of Utu-hengal ==
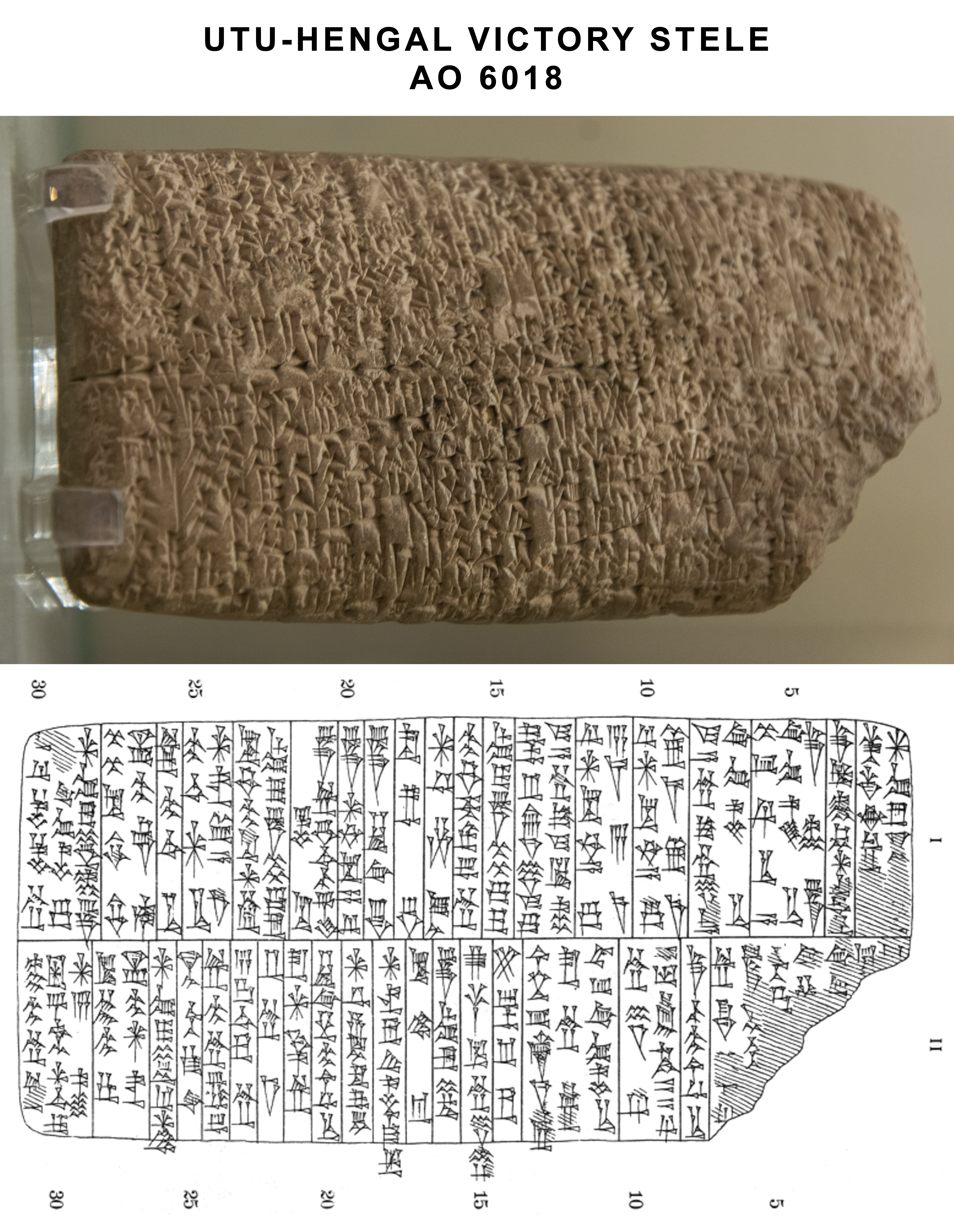
Utu-hengal victory stele AO 6018 (photograph and transcription of the obverse).

Tirigan is mentioned extensively in the victory stele of his nemesis and successor, Utu-hengal (also known as Utu-Khegal and Utu-Hegal):

The enemy troops established themselves everywhere. Tirigan, the king of Gutium, opened its (canal?) mouths, but no one came out against him [i.e. Utu-hengal]. He already occupied both banks of the Tigris. In the south, in Sumer, he blocked the water from the fields, in the uplands he closed off the roads. Because of him the grass grew high on the highways of the land.
After departing from the temple of Iškur, on the fourth day he set up camp (?) in Naĝsu on the Surungal canal, and on the fifth day he set up camp (?) at the shrine at Ili-tappê. He captured Ur-Ninazu and Nabi-Enlil, generals of Tirigan sent as envoys to Sumer, and put them in handcuffs.

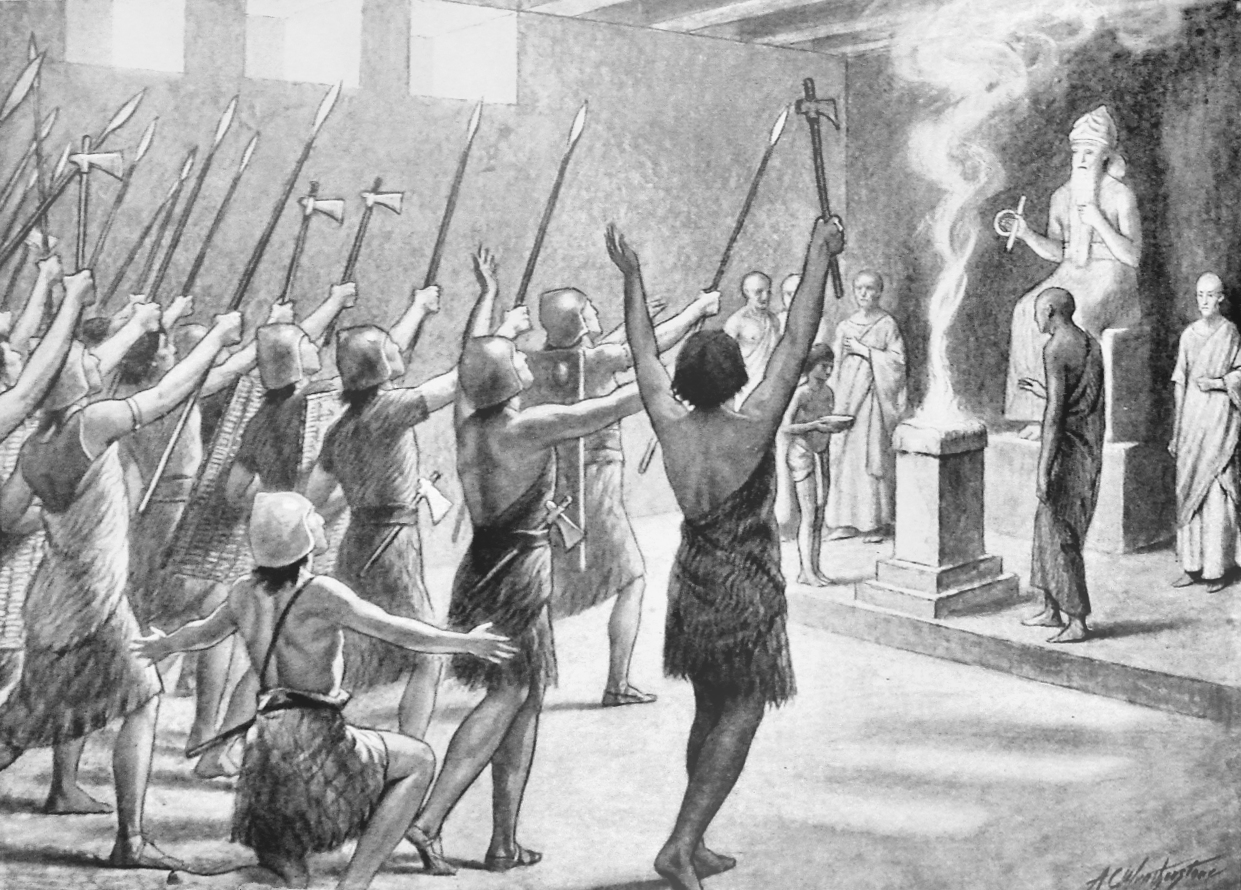
Utu-hengal, Prince of the Sumerian city of Uruk, imploring victory against the Gutian king Tirigan.

Then Tirigan the king of Gutium ran away alone on foot. He thought himself safe in Dabrum, where he fled to save his life; but since the people of Dabrum knew that Utu-ḫeĝal was a king endowed with power by Enlil, they did not let Tirigan go, and an envoy of Utu-ḫeĝal arrested Tirigan together with his wife and children in Dabrum. He put handcuffs and a blindfold on him. Before Utu, Utu-ḫeĝal made him lie at his feet and placed his foot on his neck. He made Gutium, the fanged (?) snake of the mountains drink again from the crevices (?), he ……, he …… and he …… boat. He brought back the kingship of Sumer.

— Victory Stele of Utu-Hengal

Preceded by Si'um	King of Sumer fl. late 3rd millennium BC	Succeeded by Utu-hengal (Uruk V)

== See also ==
- History of Sumer
- Sumerian King List
- List of Mesopotamian dynasties
- Chronology of the ancient Near East
