= Gutian rule in Mesopotamia =

Gutian Dynasty of Sumer

Gutian Dynasty of Sumer
- c. 2220 BC–c. 2119 BC
- Capital: Adab
- Common languages: Gutian language and Sumerian language
- Government: Monarchy
  - fl. c. 2220—2211 BC (MC): Erridu-pizir (first)
  - fl. c. 2120—2119 BC (MC): Tirigan (last)
- Historical era: Bronze Age
  - Established: c. 2220 BC
  - Disestablished: c. 2119 BC
Preceded by	Succeeded by
Akkadian Empire	Fifth Dynasty of Uruk; Third Dynasty of Ur
- Today part of: Iraq

The Gutian dynasty (Sumerian: 𒄖𒋾𒌝𒆠, gu-ti-um^{KI}) was a line of kings, originating among the Gutian people. Originally thought to be a horde that swept in and brought down Akkadian and Sumerian rule in Mesopotamia, the Gutians are now known to have been in the area for at least a century by then. By the end of the Akkadian period, the Sumerian city of Adab was occupied by the Gutians, who made it their capital. The Gutian dynasty came to power in Mesopotamia near the end of the 3rd millennium BC, after the decline and fall of the Akkadian Empire. How long Gutian kings held rulership over Mesopotamia is uncertain, with estimates ranging from a few years up to a century. The end of the Gutian dynasty is marked by the accession of Uruk ruler Utu-hengal (c. 2119 - 2112 BC), marking the short-lived "Fifth dynasty of Uruk", followed by Ur ruler Ur-Nammu (c. 2112 – 2094 BC), founder of the Third Dynasty of Ur.

There are very few hard facts available regarding the rulers of the Gutian dynasty, still fewer about the Gutian people; even their homeland is not known. We have a few royal inscriptions from one ruler, Erridu-pizir, an inscribed macehead from another, La-erabum, a handful of passing mentions from contemporary Mesopotamian rulers, and one long inscription by Uruk ruler Utu-hengal. And there are the many versions of the Sumerian King List, most recensions of which were written long after the time of the Gutian dynasty and give different, sometimes contradictory accounts. The earliest version of the Sumerian King List, written in the Ur III period, not long afterward in time, does not mention the Gutians and lists a Gutian ruler, Tirigan, as a king of Adab. Yet the Sumerian King List remains the only historical source that mentions most Gutian kings.

Still, clearly the Gutian rulers had a huge impact on late 3rd millennium BC Mesopotamia, reflected in the vast array of literary compositions featuring them, continuing for almost two millennia.

La-erabum, "Great King of Gutiim"
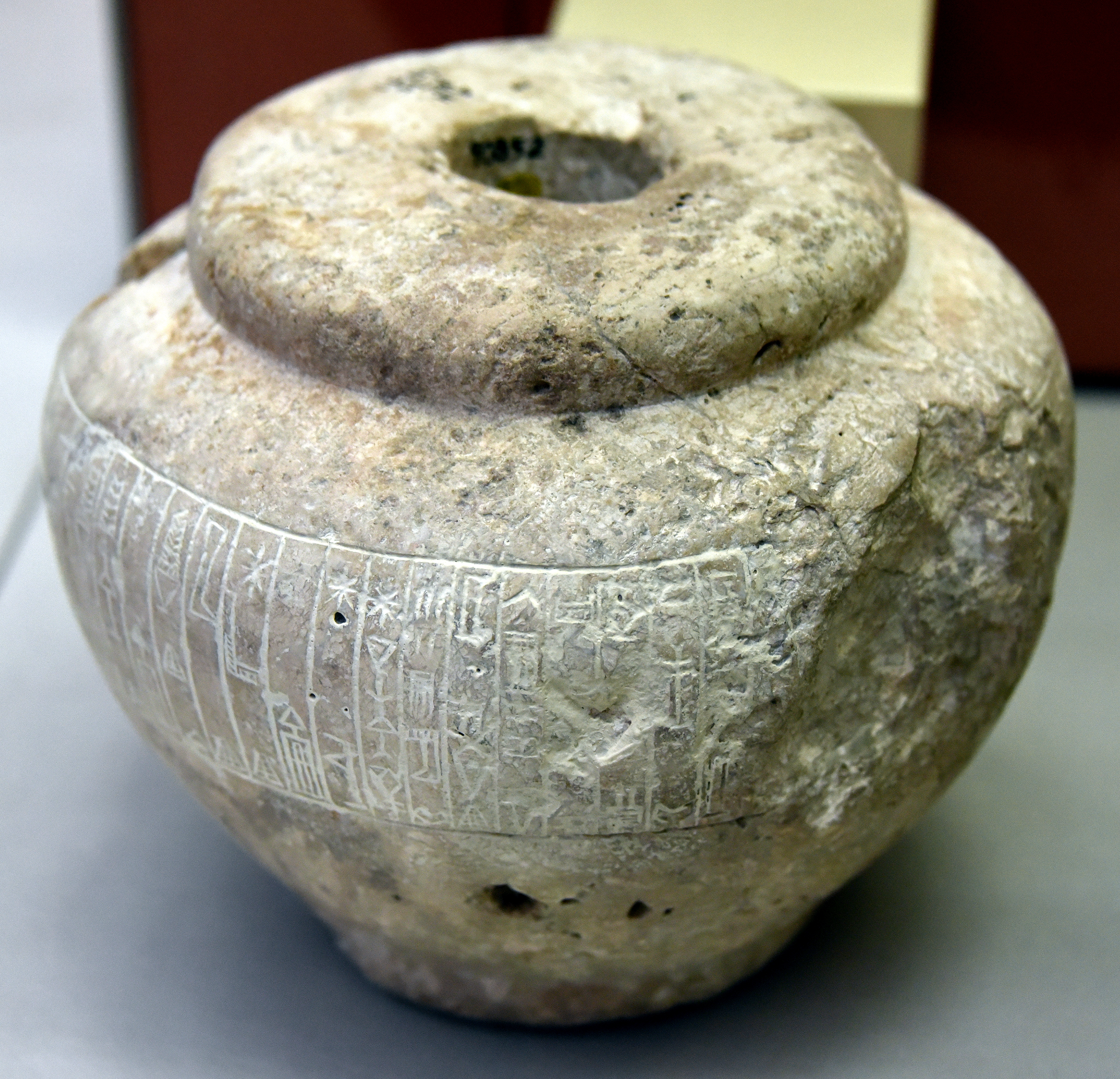
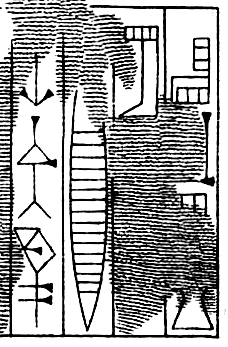
Votive macehead of Gutian king La-erabum, circa 2150 BC, and its inscription "La-eraab, great King of Gutiim" (𒆷𒂍𒊏𒀊 𒁕𒈝 𒈗 𒄖𒋾𒅎 la-e-ra-ab da-num lugal gutiim). The name is quite damaged and was initially read "Lasiraab". British Museum (BM 90852)

== History ==
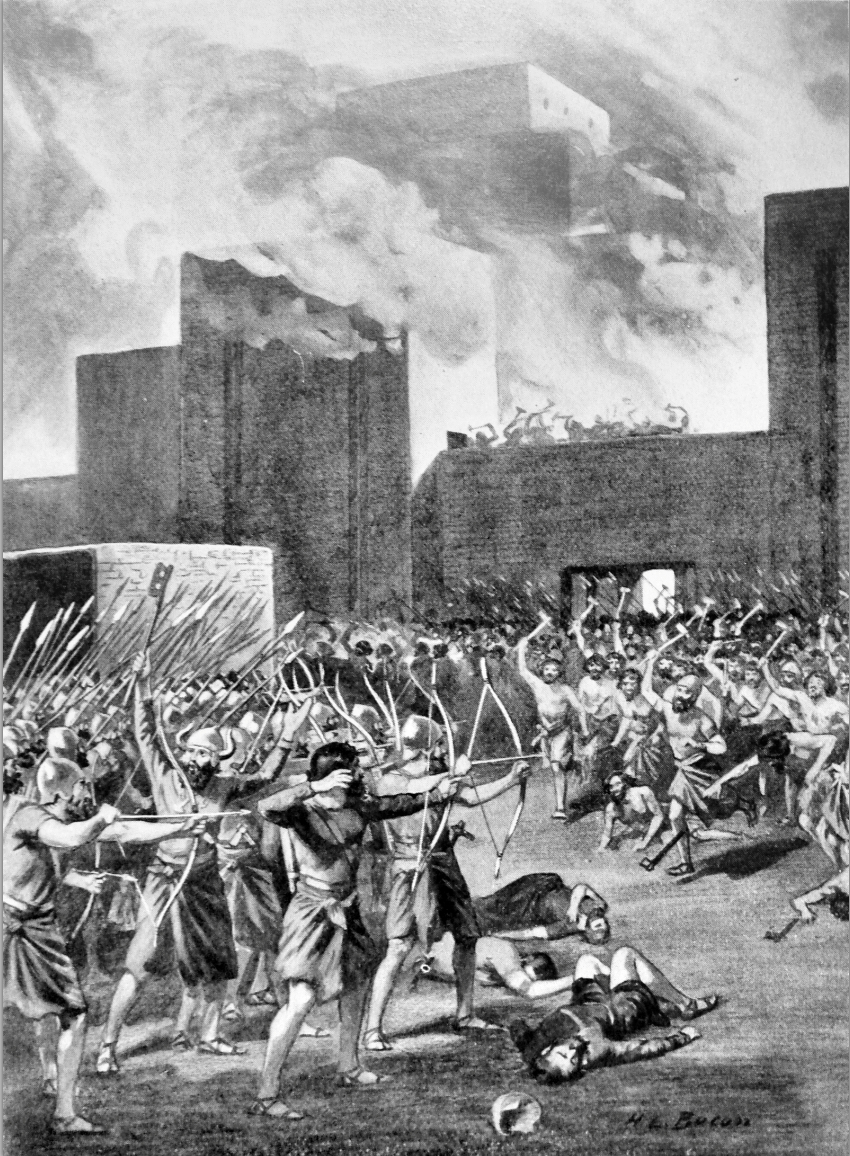
The Gutians attacking a Babylonian city, as Akkadians are making a stand outside their city. Modern 19th century illustration.

At one time it was believed that Gutium was known from the 24th century BC, well before the time of the Gutian dynasty. This was based on a tablet purportedly from the Early Dynastic ruler of Adab Lugal-Anne-Mundu. The inscription included Gutium in the area paying tribute to the ruler. This inscription is now understood to be an Old Babylonian period literary composition written many centuries after the time of Lugal-Anne-Mundu. The first attestation of Gutium came from early in the Sargonic period when the Gutians are mentioned in year names of Akkadian rulers and established a capital at the prominent Early Dynastic Sumerian city of Adab.

The full history of the Gutian dynasty is not known. It is known that it lies roughly between two major empires of the late 3rd millennium BC, the Akkadian Empire and the later Ur III Empire. Towards the end of the reign of the last notable Akkadian ruler, Shar-Kali-Sharri (c. 2218-2193 BC), the Akkadian Empire went on to a period of disarray under several weak rulers beginning a tumultuous time in Mesopotamia as Early Dynastic city-states such as Lagash and Uruk began to re-assert themselves. The Gutian newcomers in Adab also asserted their claim to rulership. This contentious time ended with the rise of Ur III under Ur-Nammu (c. 2112 - 2094 BC).

The end point of the Gutian dynasty is felt to be certain based on a long inscription of Utu-hengal (c. 2119 – 2112 BC) who was ruler of Uruk (and thought to be the brother of the first Ur II ruler Ur-Nammu) which described the destruction of the Gutians under their king Tirigan. For what happened up to then our only sources are the many conflicting recensions of the Sumerian King List (SKL) and the various literary compositions that were produced in the following centuries and millennia. Neither are historically reliable sources but can be mined for insights into the events of the Gutian period.

== Contemporary sources ==
=== Shar-kali-sharri Year Names ===
In the period before the Gutian dynasty gained rulership over Mesopotamia the Akkadian Empire controlled the region. Two year names of Akkadian ruler Shar-kali-sharri (the last before the empire began to unravel) reflect of interaction with Gutium.

- "In the year in which Szarkaliszarri laid the foundations of the temples of the goddess Annunitum and of the god Aba in Babylon and when he defeated Szarlak, king of Gutium"
- "Year in which the yoke was imposed on Gutium".

=== Ur-Nammu Year Name ===
One year name of Ur ruler Ur-Nammu mentions Gutium. It is uncertain if the year name was from the time when he was only governor at Ur, leaving the possibility it was a reflected year name of Utu-hengal, or was later after he had assumed rulership over Mesopotamia.

- "Year Gutium was destroyed"

=== Tablet of Lugalannatum ===
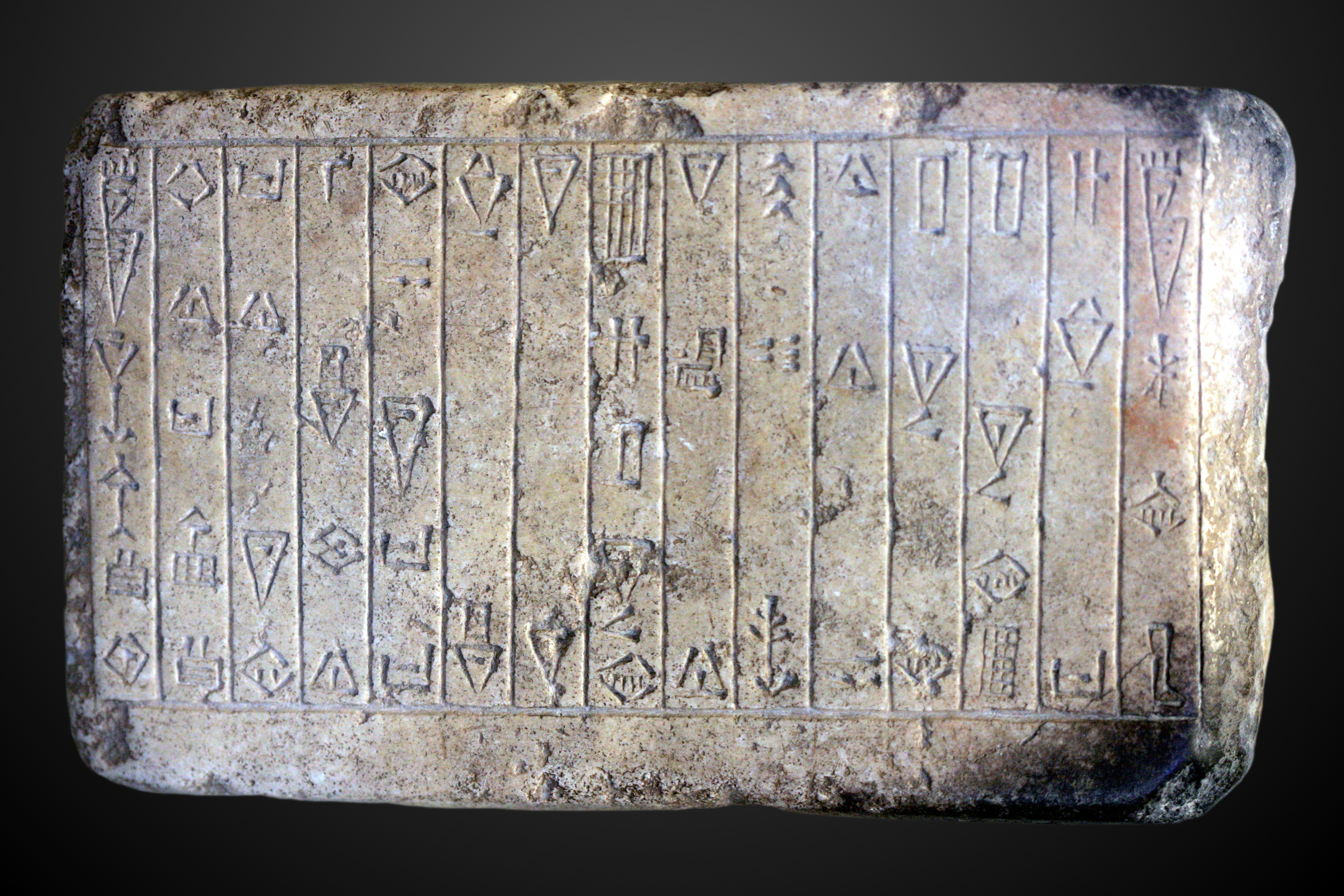
Tablet of Lugalanatum

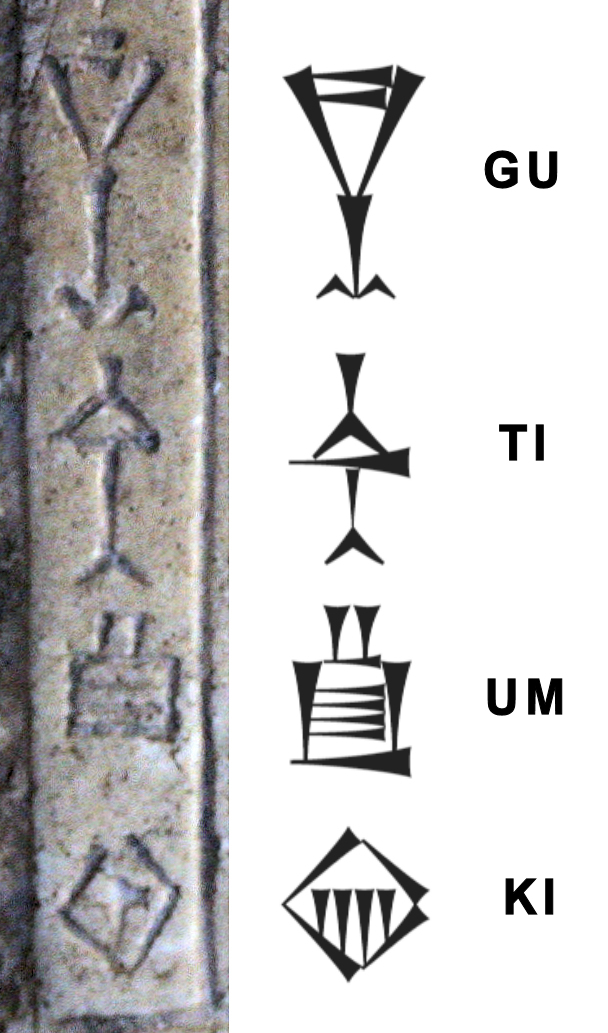
"Gutium"

The name 𒄖𒋾𒌝𒆠, gu-ti-um^{KI} appears in the last column. Louvre Museum.

The tablet marks the building of a temple, E-gidru, in Umma. In passing it mentions the name of a Gutian ruler.

- "Lugal-ana-tuma, governor of Umma — 35 years having past since (the territory of) Umma was divided up — built the E-gidru at Umma, drove into the earth its foundation pegs, (and) saw after everything that was necessary therein. At that time, Si'um was king of Gutium."

=== Cylindrical Tablet of Nammahni ===
The Umma ruler Nammahni, marking the construction of a temple to the goddess Ninura, mentioned in passing the name of a Gutian ruler.

- "For the goddess Ninura, mother of Umma, Namahni, governor of Umma, built her E-ula temple (and) restored it. At that time Iarlagan was king of Gutium."

=== Tablet of Išarum ===
A tablet from Umma, dating to the waning days of the Akkadian empire, mentions a Gutian governor.

- "Thus says Išarum to Me-sag “As to the fact that Lugal-ĝiš and? Ka-Utu ... How can my loyal servant, who has held my feet, become hostile? (By) Ištar and Ilaba I swear that he shall approach me. I will not set the weapon of blood against him. Henceforth, I shall appoint him anew as the Gutian ensi. ..."

=== Tablet of Utu-hengal ===
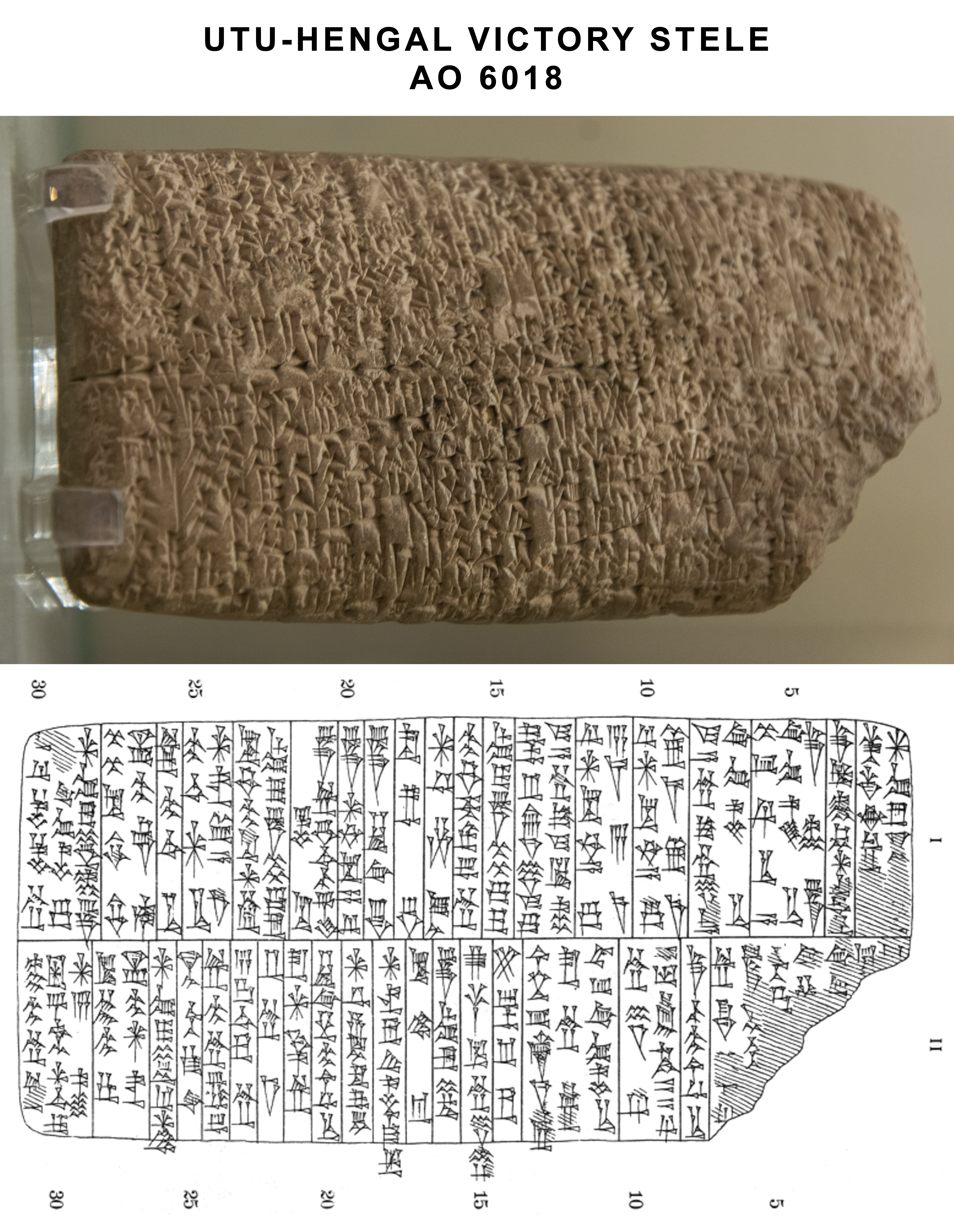
Utu-Hengal victory stele AO 6018 (photograph and transcription of the obverse). Louvre Museum

An inscription of the Uruk ruler Utu-hengal, known from 3 Old Babylonian copies, commemorated the defeat of Gutian (and its king Tirigan) and the return of rulership to Sumer. Note the Mesopotamian names of Tirigan's generals.

- "The god Enlil — (as for) Gu[tium], the fanged serpent of the mountain, who acted with violence against the gods, who carried off the kingship of the land of Sumer to the mountain land, who fi[ll]ed the land of Sumer with wickedness, who took away the wife from the one who had a wife, who took away the child from the one who had a child, who put wickedness and evil in the land (of Sumer) — the god Enlil, lord of the foreign lands, commissioned Utu-hegal, the mighty man, king of Uruk, king of the four quarters, the king whose utterance cannot be countermanded, to destroy their name. (Thereupon) he (Utu-hegal) went to the goddess Inanna, his lady (and) prayed to her,(saying) 'My lady, lioness of battle, who butts the foreign lands, the god Enlil has com[missioned me]to bring back the kingship of the land of Sumer. [May you be my] a[lly] The enemy hordes had trampled(everything). Tiri[gan], the king of Gutium, had ..., (but) no one set out against him. He had seized both banks of the Tigris River. In the south, in Sumer, he had blocked (water from) the fields. In the north, he had closed off the roads (and) caused tall grass to grow up along the highway(s) of the land. (But), the king granted power by the god Enlil, the one chosen in the heart of the goddess Inanna — Utu-hegal — the mighty man, went forth from Uruk (and) set up ... in the temple of the god Iškur. He called out to the citizens of his city,(saying): 'The god Enlil has given Gutium to me. My lady, the goddess Inanna, is my ally. The god Dumuzi-ama-ušumgal-ana has declared 'It is a matter for me'. The god Gilgameš, son of the goddess Ninsun, has assigned him (Dumuzi) to me as bailiff. He made the citizens of Uruk (and) Kullab happy. His city followed him as if they were (just) one person. He (Utu-hegal) arranged in correct array his select elite troops. After he (Utu-hegal) departed (from) the temple of the god Iškur, on the fourth day he set up... in the city of Nagsu on the Iturungal canal. On the fifth day he set up ... in the shrine Ili-tappe. He captured Ur-Ninazu (and) Nabi-Enlil, generals whom he (Tirigan) had sent as envoys to the land of Sumer, (and) put handcuffs on them. After he departed (from) the shrine Ili-tappe, on the sixth day he set up ... at Karkar. He proceeded to the god Iskur (and) prayed to him, (saying) 'O god Iškur! The god Enlil has given me (his) weapon. May you be my ally'. In the middle of that night he [got up], and at day break [proceeded] (to a point) upstream from Adab. He [prayed] to him (Utu), (saying) 'O god Utu! The god Enlil has given Gutium to me. May you be my ally' In that place, against the Gutians, he laid a trap (and) led (his) troops against them. Utu-hegal, the mighty man, defeated their generals. Then Tirigan, king of Gutium, fled alone on foot. In the place where he (tried) to save his life — Dabrum — he (at first) was safe. (But) since the citizens of Dabrum realized that Utu-hegal was the king to whom the god Enlil had granted power, they did not let Tirigan go. The envoys of Utu-hegal captured Tirigan along with his wife (and) children at Dabrum. They put handcuffs and a blindfold on him. Utu-hegal made him lie at the feet of the god U[tu] and placed his foot on his neck. Gutium, the fanged serpent of the mountain — ... drank water (from[?]) the watercourses.... (Utu-hegal) removed ... He brought back the kingship of the land of Sumer."

=== Gutian ruler inscriptions ===
On a clay cone of uncertain provenance it reads "Shamash-bâni, lofty one of God, king of Guti, to Ningurra, the mother of Umma, his lofty one, the ruler of Umma, her old temple he built, and restored to its place." though no other reference to such a Gutian ruler is known.

In an Old Babylonian copy, found in Nippur, of an earlier inscription from a monument dedicated by Erridupizir to the god Enlil in Nippur it read "... Erridu-(pi]zir, the migh[ty], king of Gutium and the four quarters took (him, i. e. his opponent, the ruler of Magda) away by force through the gate of the god of Gutium, struck him, and killed him, the king (of Magda). Thus (says) Erridu-pizir, the mighty, king of Gutium [and] of the [f] our [qua]rters: >At that day I fashioned a statue of myself and placed my foot at his neck ...". The colophon read "inscribed tablet: 3 statues of Erridu-pizir".

== In later literature ==
=== Great Revolt against Naram-Sin ===
This source lives on the borderline between history and literary composition. Some elements of it are from Old Babylonian copies of Naram-Sin royal inscriptions. That core was transformed into a wide variety of literary efforts with names like "Naram-Sin and the Enemy Hordes". A relevant one is "Gula-AN and the Seventeen Kings against Naram-Sin". The narrative is that Gutian king Gula-AN, leading 17 other kings, attacks Akkad and is defeated, captured, and then paroled by Naram-Sin, only to attack again resulting in a huge battle the results of which are unknown.

- "... Gula-AN, king of Gut(i)um, [. . .], whom I [defeated] in my strong battle [. . .], and whom I had released to return to his land (but) PN [he joined], he who is not ̆flesh nor blood, verily he is [. . .]. In the Amanus the cedar mountain his oracles [he consulted]. Before the great divides of the [silver(?)] mountains, its gate he captured and stealthily in the night he attacked and my a[rmed forces] he did kill, he did decimate and he did [trample down]. [He made] a confusing mass of their corpses. The depressions and the wadis were [filled] with their blood. Until the sunrise, for six double hours he [made a forced march]. They did not let (me?) rest [. . .]. He pursued me, he [attacked] me frontally fu[riously]. 90,000 of my troops, who were under the command of [PN], he did kill, he did decimate and he did tra[mple down]. In my 360,000 troops I [had confidence]. Son of a nobody [. . .], He encircled me. For the sake(?) of life of Sargon [my fore(father)] ..." (BM 79987)

=== Geographical Treatise on Sargon of Akkad's Empire ===
Another source of uncertain historicity or dating. It is known from a single tablet, findspot thought to be Qalat Sherqat, which was translated in 1925, in the early days of cuneiform studies. Gutium is listed among the area in Sargon's domain.

- "... From Sinu (?) to [ ] the land of Armani. From [ ]izzat to Abul-Adad, the land of Gutium. From Abul-Adad to Hallab, the land of Akkad. ... From Hisat to Sippar, the land of Akkad. From Tirqan of Gutium to Uzarilulu, the land of Edamarus. From Uzarilulu to Bit-Sin, the land of Mari. ..." (KAV 092)

=== Weidner Chronicle ===
The Weidner Chronicle is a literary composition, known from 7 mostly fragmentary Neo-Assyrian and Neo-Babylonian (1st Millennium BC) recensions purportedly a copy of a damaged Old Babylonian Period (1894 - 1595 BC) original which described events of centuries earlier. In the case of the Gutians the premise is that the Gutians destroyed the Akkadian Empire because Naram-Sin was mean to the city of Babylon. There are scholars who state that the description of the Gutian rule over parts of Mesopotamia was fiction or that it at least gave undue importance to the Guti horde. This is believed to be perpetuated by the chroniclers of Uruk to turn Utu-hegal's minor victory into an event of universal significance for the purpose of solidifying support for his emergent regime. This view is based on the varying accounts of the surviving manuscripts, with many of them in total disagreement as to the length of the king's reign and even the identities of the Guti kings. The Weidner Chronicle accounts for the Gutian period as follows:

- "Naram-Sin defiled the people of Babylon. Twice he called up the horde of Gutium against it. ... his people as with a goad ... he gave his sovereignty to the horde of Gutium. Gutium was an oppressive people. They did not know divine worship; rites and regulations they did not know how to perform properly. [Utuhegal] the "fisherman" caught fish as offering-presents on the edge of the seacoast. Until that fish was offered to the [Lord Prince] Marduk, it was not offered to any other god. The Gutians took the cooked fish away from him before it was offered. By his exalted command he took away sovereignty from the horde and gave it to Utuhegal"

=== Cuthean Legend of Naram-Sin ===
In this text, the Gutians are "scattered" by an unknown horde, the Umman Manda on their way to attacking Naram-Sin with the Gutians then picking up the pieces afterward. An excerpt reads

- "... They scattered the (army of the upper) seas, and reached Gutium. ... They scattered (the army of) Gutium and reached Elam. ..."

=== Tablet of Islikun-Dagan ===
A tablet, thought to be from Uruk and from the period following the fall of the Akkadian Empire Islikun-Dagan, known from another tablet read:

- "Islikun-Dagan to ... Cultivate the land and preserve the cattle. Up to now the Gutian did not cultivate the land. Don't say 'How so ?' You are strong, so settle Akkad (?), and do you cultivate the land. Let the store-places and the ponds be sought (?) out for you for an approach, and have the cattle brought into the city. With regard to (?) the cattle the Gutians have reared (?), now as for myself I shall say nothing, I shall pay you the money. I swear by the life of Sharkalisharri that if you will indeed deliver the cattle the Gutians reared (?) of your own free will, I will transport (? lit. carry), and that I will pay you the money when (the cattle) come to me.

=== Lugal-Ane-mundu inscription ===
Originally thought to be an authentic inscription of the 24th century BC ruler it is now known to be a pseudoautobiographical literary composition. It is known from 3 Old Babylonian tablet copies. The fragmentary text lists areas that are tributary to Lugal-Ane-mundu.

- "... The ... of broad Gutium ... seized the ... in Zulum, ... The chief ministers of the Cedar Mountain, Elam, Marḫaši, Gutium, Subartu, Amurru, Sutium and ... The ... of the Cedar Mountain, Elam, Marḫaši, Gutium, ... Subartu, Amurru, Sutium, and the Mountain(?) of Eanna"

=== Curse of Akkad ===
More commonly called the Curse of Agade (known by Sumerians as "The Frown of Enlil"), this is a Sumerian literary composition, many sources and versions of which have been found, purporting to describe the fall of the Akkadian Empire because it had been cursed by the gods. On the Gutians it says:

- "Enlil brought out of the mountains those who do not resemble other people, who are not reckoned as part of the Land, the Gutians, an unbridled people, with human intelligence but canine instincts and monkeys' features. Like small birds they swooped on the ground in great flocks. Because of Enlil, they stretched their arms out across the plain like a net for animals. Nothing escaped their clutches, no one left their grasp. Messengers no longer traveled the highways, the courier's boat no longer passed along the rivers. The Gutians drove the trusty (?) goats of Enlil out of their folds and compelled their herdsmen to follow them, they drove the cows out of their pens and compelled their cowherds to follow them. Prisoners manned the watch. Brigands occupied the highways. The doors of the city gates of the Land lay dislodged in mud, and all the foreign lands uttered bitter cries from the walls of their cities. They established gardens for themselves within the cities, and not as usual on the wide plain outside. As if it had been before the time when cities were built and founded, the large arable tracts yielded no grain, the inundated tracts yielded no fish, the irrigated orchards yielded no syrup or wine, the thick clouds (?) did not rain, the macgurum plant did not grow."

== Religion ==
We know little about what deities the Gutian rulers worshiped though we do know that they did follow gods (both their own, and those of Mesopotamia based on inscriptions of their first known ruler, Erridu-pizir such as this one:

- "[Upon his enemy] he inflicted punishment. Their survivors delivered (lit. “took here”) their offerings – their donkeys, their horses, their large and small cattle. They embraced the feet of the god of Gutium and Erridu-pizir, (saying): “Let our lord ... (rest broken)"

and

- "[The god ... is his (personal) god], [the goddess Esta]r-[Annuni]tum (is) his ..., (and) the god Ilaba, the mighty one of the gods, is his clan (god). Erridu-pizir, the mighty, king of Gutium and of the four quarters: ... and dedicated a statue of myself to the god Enlil in Nippur. As for the one who removes this inscription, may the gods Samas, Astar, [and] Ila[ba] tear out his foundations and destroy his [p]rogeny."

And on the mace head of a later Gutian ruler La-erabum

- "Lasirab, the mig[hty, ki]ng of [G]utium, Lacuna ... fash[ioned] and dedicated (this mace) .As for the one who removes this inscription and writes his own name (instead), may the god of Gutium, Astar, and Sin tear out his foundations and destroy his progeny."

One possible god of Gutium has been proposed, Abublab, identified with Ninurta.

== List of rulers ==
Aside from a few inscriptions, mostly from a single ruler, Erridupizir, most of what is known about the names and reigns of Gutian rulers comes from the Sumerian King List (SKL). There are about two dozen sources, most fragments, for the SKL which often conflict. The earliest source is from the Ur III period, well after some of the events described. Unlike the literary narratives, which have the Akkadian Empire falling to the Gutian hordes, the SKL has rulership passing from Akkad to Uruk, which then falls to the Gutians. It is also unknown if the dynasties listed in the SKL are all sequential or if there is overlap in rulership. Note that the order and dates vary in different recensions of the SKL. The listed reign lengths throughout much of the Gutian period are comparatively short and uniform. The following list should not be considered complete:

#	Portrait or inscription	Ruler	Approx. date and length of reign	Comments, notes, and references for mentions
Akkadian period (c. 2350 – c. 2154 BC)
Gutian kings not on the SKL (c. 2350 – c. 2211 BC)
1st		Sarlak	Uncertain, fl. c. 2350 – c. 2250 BC (MC) fl. c. 2250 – c. 2150 BC (SC)	Historicity uncertain; temp. of Enshakushanna; temp. of Sargon
2nd		Gula-AN	Uncertain, fl. c. 2250 – c. 2220 BC (MC) fl. c. 2150 – c. 2147 BC (SC)	Historicity uncertain; temp. of Naram-Suen according to the narrative Gula-AN and the Seventeen Kings against Naram-Sin
3rd		Erridupizir 𒂊𒅕𒊑𒁺𒉿𒍣𒅕	Uncertain, reigned c. 2220 – c. 2211 BC (MC) r. c. 2147 – c. 2138 BC (SC) (9 years)	temp. of Naram-Suen; temp. of Ka-Nisba; Thought to be the, "king without a name" mentioned on the SKL; Held the title of, "King of the Four Corners"; Known from a number of royal inscriptions
Gutian kings on the SKL (c. 2211 – c. 2120 BC)
"Then the reign of Uruk was abolished and the kingship was taken to the land of Gutium. In the land of Gutium, at first no king was famous; they ruled themselves for 5 years." — Sumerian King List (SKL)
4th		Imta	Uncertain, fl. c. 2211 – c. 2208 BC (MC) fl. c. 2138 – c. 2135 BC (SC) (3 years)	
5th		Inkishush 𒅔𒆠𒋙	Uncertain, fl. c. 2208 – c. 2202 BC (MC) fl. c. 2135 – c. 2129 BC (SC) (6 or 7 years)	temp. of Naram-Suen
6th		Sarlagab 𒉌𒆸𒆷𒃮	Uncertain, fl. c. 2202 – c. 2196 BC (MC) fl. c. 2129 – c. 2126 BC (SC) (6 years)	Same person as Sharlag (?); temp. of Sharkalisharri
7th		Shulme 𒂄𒈨𒂊	Uncertain, fl. c. 2196 – c. 2190 BC (MC) fl. c. 2126 – c. 2120 BC (SC) (6 years)	
8th		Elulmesh 𒋛𒇻𒇻𒈨𒌍	Uncertain, fl. c. 2190 – c. 2184 BC (MC) fl. c. 2120 – c. 2114 BC (SC) (6 or 7 years)	Same person as Elulu (?)
9th		Inimabakesh 𒄿𒉌𒈠𒁀𒆠𒌍	Uncertain, fl. c. 2184 – c. 2179 BC (MC) fl. c. 2114 – c. 2109 BC (SC) (5 or 6 years)	
10th		Igeshaush 𒄿𒄄𒌍𒀀𒍑	Uncertain, fl. c. 2179 – c. 2173 BC (MC) fl. c. 2109 – c. 2103 BC (SC) (3 or 6 years)	
11th		Yarlagab 𒅀𒅈𒆷𒃮	Uncertain, fl. c. 2173 – c. 2158 BC (MC) fl. c. 2103 – c. 2088 BC (SC) (5 or 15 years)	
12th		Ibate 𒄿𒁀𒋼	Uncertain, fl. c. 2158 – c. 2155 BC (MC) fl. c. 2088 – c. 2085 BC (SC) (3 years)	
Gutian period (c. 2154 – c. 2119 BC)
13th		Yarla 𒅀𒅈𒆷	Uncertain, fl. c. 2155 – c. 2152 BC (MC) fl. c. 2085 – c. 2082 BC (SC) (3 years)	
14th		Kurum 𒆪𒊒𒌝	Uncertain, fl. c. 2152 – c. 2151 BC (MC) fl. c. 2082 – c. 2081 BC (SC) (1 or 3 years)	
15th		Apilkin 𒀀𒉈𒆠𒅔	Uncertain, fl. c. 2151 – c. 2148 BC (MC) fl. c. 2081 – c. 2078 BC (SC) (3 years)	
16th		La-erabum 𒆷𒂍𒊏𒁍𒌝	Uncertain, fl. c. 2148 – c. 2146 BC (MC) fl. c. 2078 – c. 2076 BC (SC) (2 years)	Known from a alabaster mace head inscription found at Sippar
17th		Irarum 𒄿𒊏𒊒𒌝	Uncertain, fl. c. 2146 – c. 2144 BC (MC) fl. c. 2076 – c. 2074 BC (SC) (2 years)	
18th		Ibranum 𒅁𒊏𒉡𒌝	Uncertain, fl. c. 2144 – c. 2143 BC (MC) fl. c. 2074 – c. 2073 BC (SC) (1 year)	
19th		Hablum 𒄩𒀊𒈝	Uncertain, fl. c. 2143 – c. 2141 BC (MC) fl. c. 2073 – c. 2071 BC (SC) (2 years)	
20th		Puzur-Suen 𒅤𒊭𒀭𒂗𒍪	Uncertain, fl. c. 2141 – c. 2134 BC (MC) fl. c. 2071 – c. 2064 BC (SC) (7 years)	Son of Hablum
21st		Yarlaganda 𒅀𒅈𒆷𒂵𒀭𒁕	Uncertain, fl. c. 2134 – c. 2127 BC (MC) fl. c. 2064 – c. 2057 BC (SC) (7 years)	Known from inscription of Nammahni of Umma.
22nd		Siium 𒋛𒅇𒌝	Uncertain, fl. c. 2127 – c. 2120 BC (MC) fl. c. 2057 – c. 2050 BC (SC) (7 years)	temp. of Lugalannatum; Known from a foundation inscription at Umma
23rd		Tirigan 𒋾𒌷𒂵𒀀𒀭	Uncertain, fl. c. 2120 – c. 2119 BC (MC) fl. c. 2055, c. 2050 BC (SC) (40 days)	temp. of Utu-hengal; temp. of Ur-Nammu; Defeated by the Uruk king (Utu-hengal) according to victory stele erected in Uruk
"23 kings; they ruled for 125 years and 40 days. Then the army of Gutium was defeated and the kingship was taken to Uruk." — SKL

== See also ==
- History of Sumer
- List of Mesopotamian dynasties
