= Lugalannatum =

Lugalannatum 𒈗𒀭𒈾𒁺

Governor of Umma
- Tenure: c. 2130 BC

Tablet of Lugalannatum

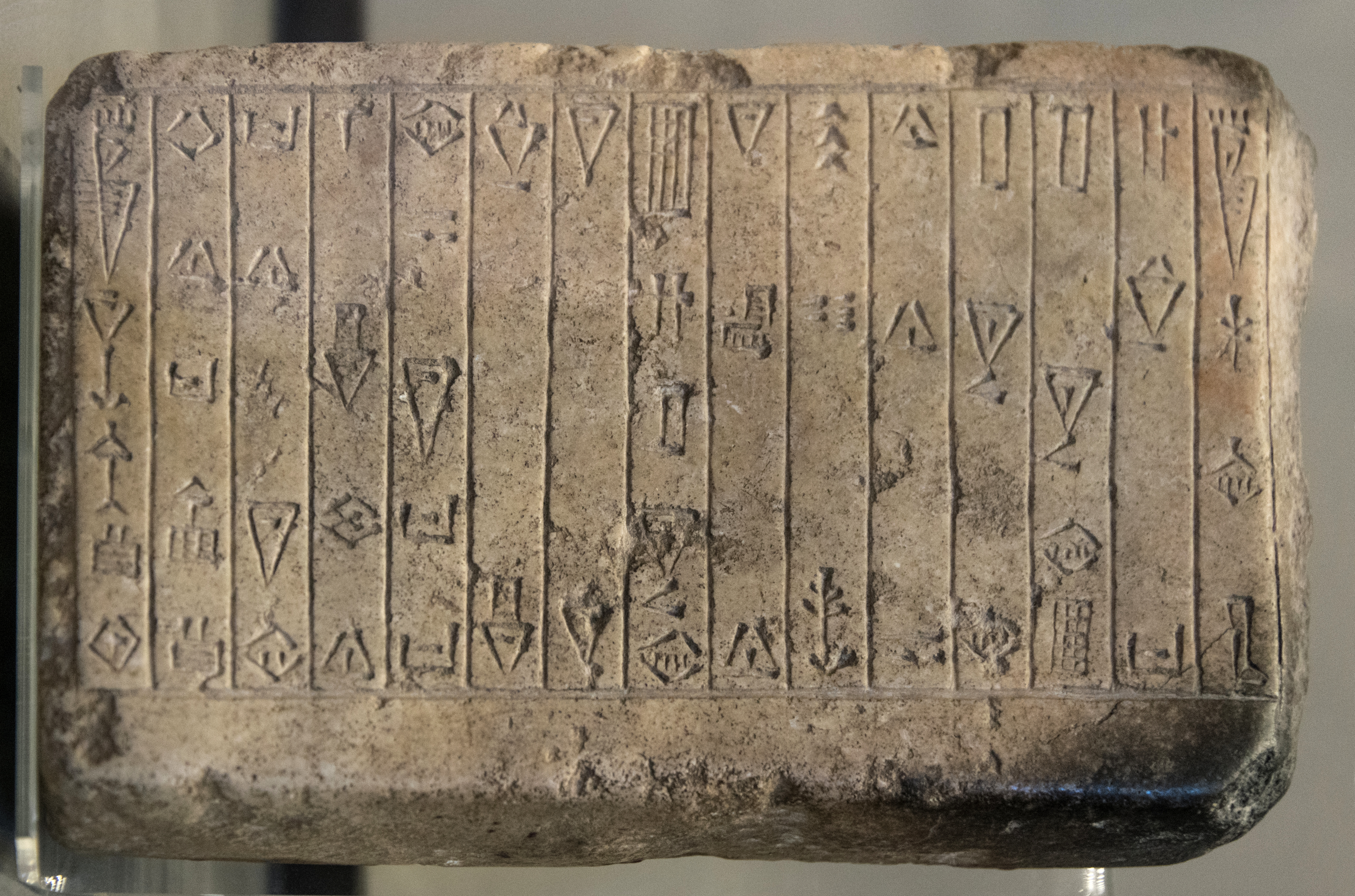
Lugalannatum
patesi of
Umma,
(as) Umma
abounded
for 35 years
in liberalities,
Ê PA, the rich temple of Umma,
he spread
its foundations
in place, he set up
its rites, inside
he organized,
at the time of Ba-siûm,
king of Gutium.

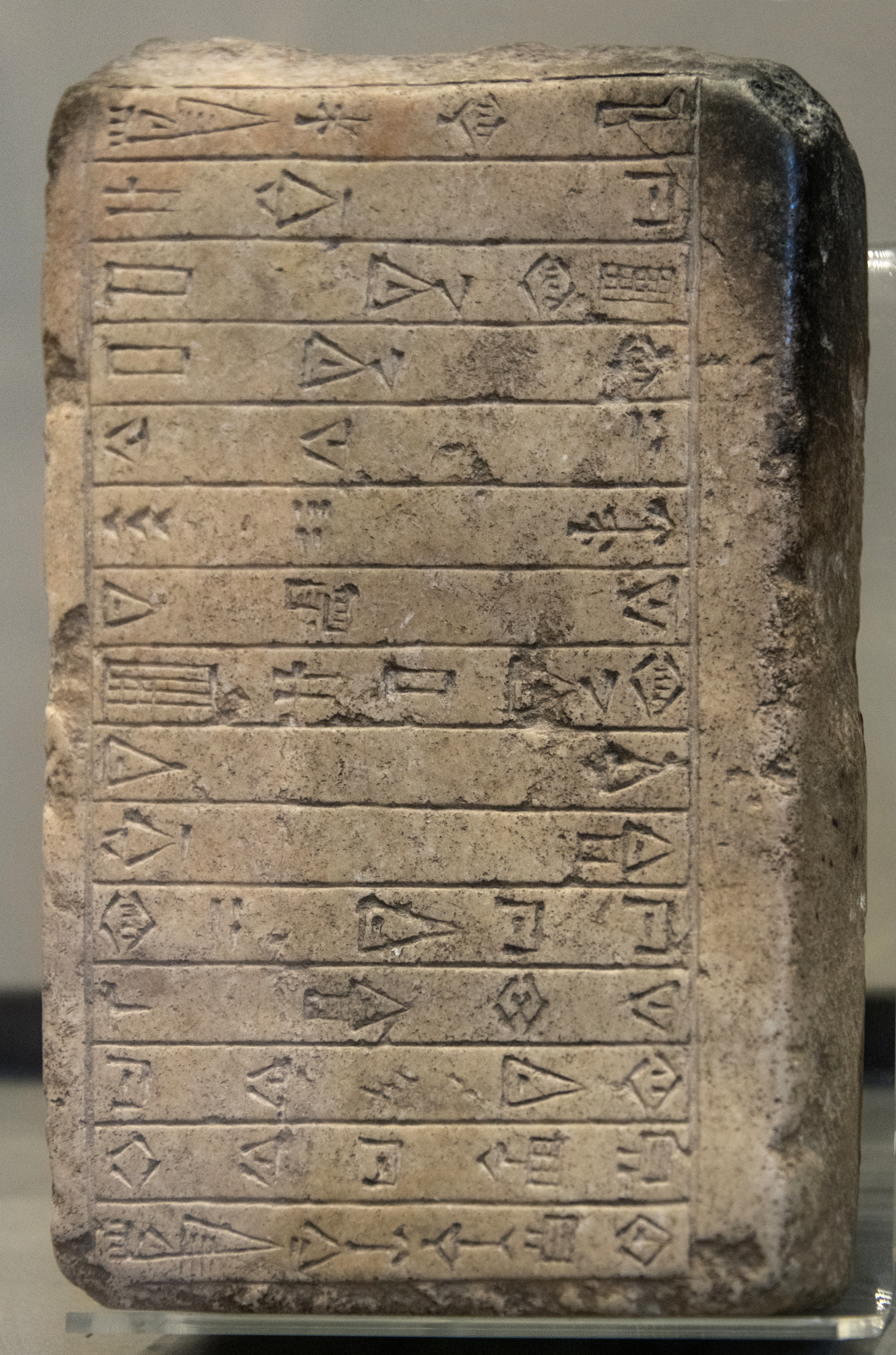
𒈗𒀭𒈾𒁺
𒑐𒋼𒋛
𒄑𒆵𒆠𒆤
𒄑𒆵𒆠
𒁀𒁀𒀀
𒐁𒐃𒈬
𒊩𒆷𒁀
𒂍𒑐𒄑𒆵𒆠
𒊩𒊩
𒋼𒈨𒁉
𒆠𒀀𒉌𒋛𒋛
𒈨𒁉𒉺𒁀
𒋛𒁀𒉌𒁲
𒌓𒁀𒋛𒅇𒌝

𒈗𒄖𒋾𒌝𒆠

A Gutian inscription dated c. 2130 BC: "Lugalannatum prince of Umma ... built the E.GIDRU [Sceptre] Temple at Umma, buried his foundation deposit [and] regulated the orders. At that time, Si'um was king of Gutium." AO 4783, Louvre Museum.

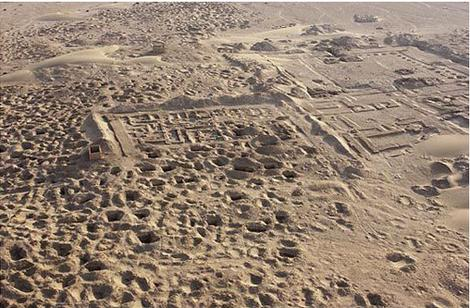
Aerial view of the ruins of Umma, 2003

Lugalannatum (𒈗𒀭𒈾𒁺, lu-gal-an-na-tum; fl. c. 2130 BC) was a ruler ("patesi") of the city of Umma.

Lugalannatum is known from a deposit tablet, now in the Louvre Museum, in which he mentions the rule of Si'um, king of the Gutians. The tablet was first published in 1911, and first revealed the existence of a Gutian dynasty of Sumer. The tablet is written in Akkadian following the influence of the former Kingdom of Akkad, and uses Sumerian cuneiform characters for their phonetical value. It reads:

Lugal-an-na-tum/ pa-te-si/ GIS UH KI-ge/ GIS UH Kl/ ba-ba-a/ 30 + 5 mu/ sal-la-ba/ ê pa GIS UH Kl/ sal-sal/ temen-bi/ ki-a ni-si-si/ me-bi sag-ba/ si-ba-ni-sa/ ud Ba-si-û-um/ lugal Gu-ti-um kam

Lugalannatum, patesi of Umma, (as) Umma for 35 years abounded in liberalities, Ê PA, the rich temple of Umma, its foundations he established, he ensured rites inside, and set up rules, at the time of Ba-siûm, king of Gutium.

— Tablet of Lugalannatum

The name of the Temple, previously thought to be "Ê PA Temple", is now understood as being "Scepter Temple", and read E.GIDRU.

The text shows the allegiance of Lugalannatum, as simple Governor of Umma, towards the Gutian king of Sumer.

There is also an inscription by Lugalannatum, dedicated to the life of Urgigir.

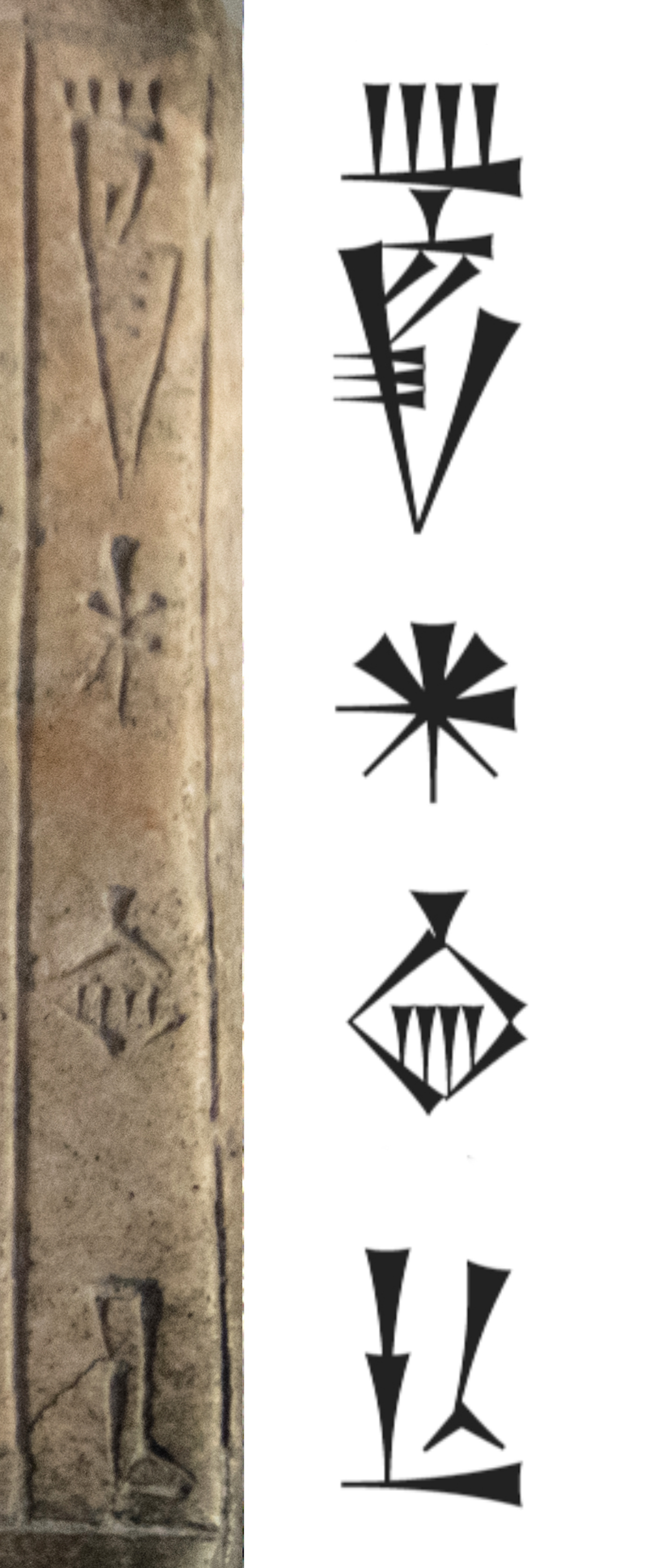
The name Lugalannatum in archaic linear script, and in standard Sumero-Akkadian cuneiform (𒈗𒀭𒈾𒁺)

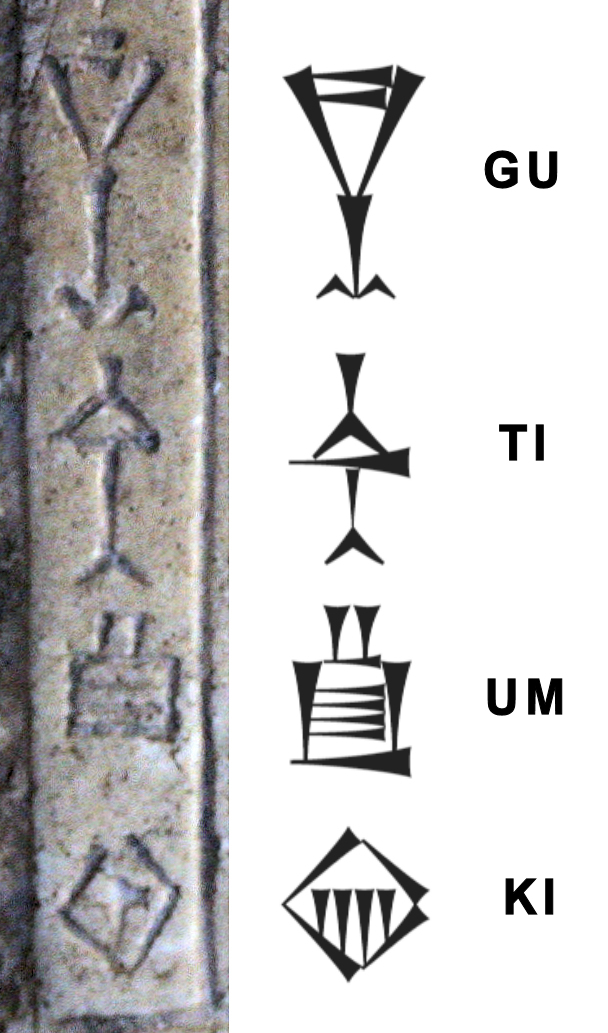
Mention of Gutium in the tablet (last column: 𒄖𒋾𒌝𒆠, gu-ti-um^{KI})
