= Grigory Bongard-Levin =

Soviet-Russian indologist, historian

Grigory Maksimovich Bongard-Levin (Russian: Григорий Максимович Бонгард-Левин) (1933–2008) was a Russian historian specializing on Ancient India and the history of Central Asia. He also published on the history of Russian emigration. He was a member of the Russian Academy of Sciences and was awarded the USSR State Prize in 1988. In 2006 he was awarded India's third highest civilian award Padma Bhushan which ranked below Bharat Ratna and Padma Vibhushan for his contribution in the field of Ancient India history

== Works ==
- 1981, The Origin of the Aryans, Prometheus Books, ISBN 978-0-391-02193-8
- 1985, Ancient Indian Civilization Древнеиндийская цивилизация, Humanities Press, ISBN 978-0-391-03358-0
- 1986, Complex Study of Ancient India: A Multi Disciplinary Approach, South Asia Books ISBN 978-81-202-0141-5
- 1986, Mauryan India, Stosius Inc/Advent Books Division, ISBN 978-0-86590-826-0
- 2001, Древняя Индия, История и культура (Ancient India, history and culture), Aletejya, ISBN 978-5-89329-365-4
