= Gutians =

People of ancient west Asia

Gutians

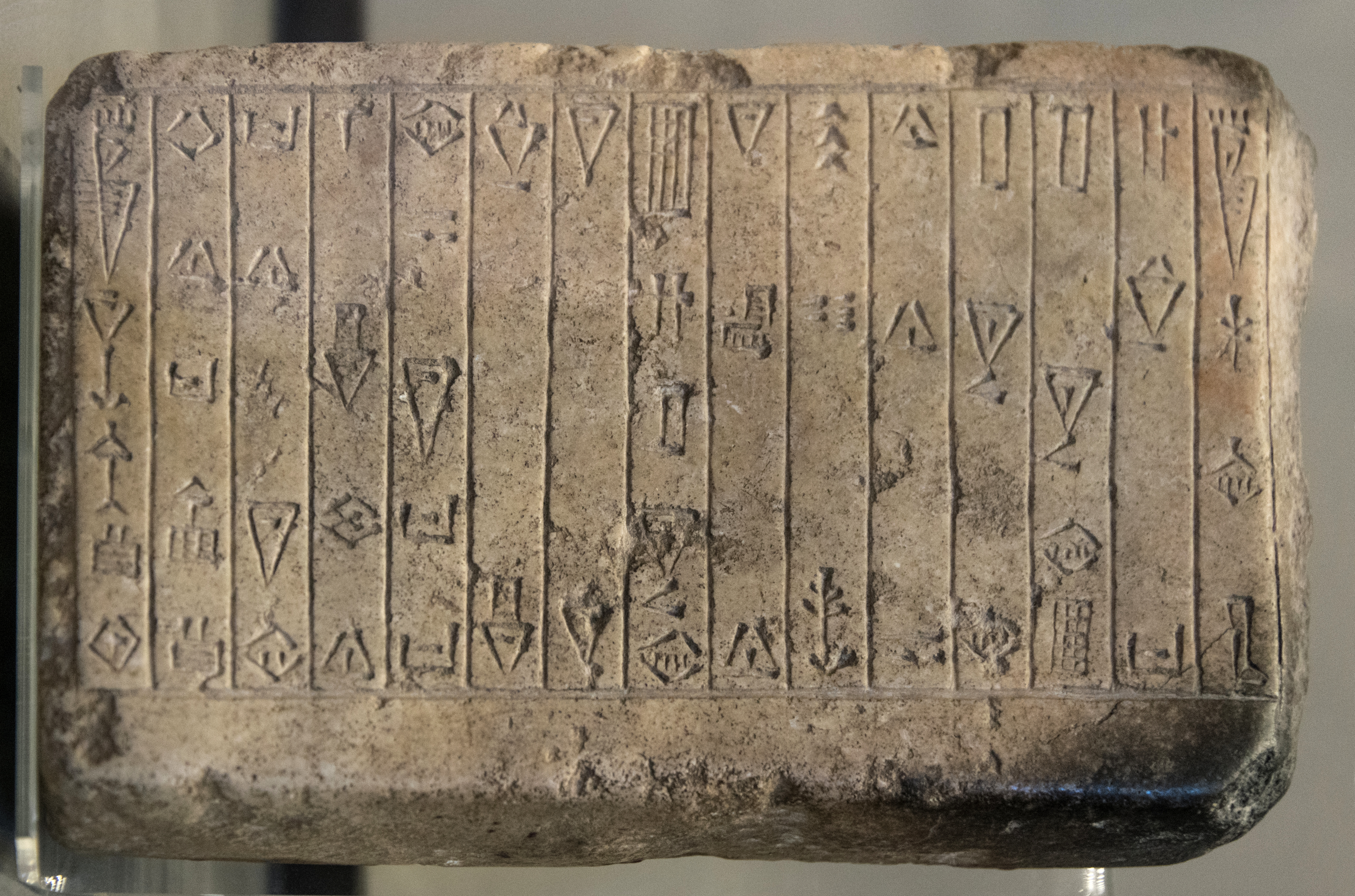
Tablet of Lugalanatum

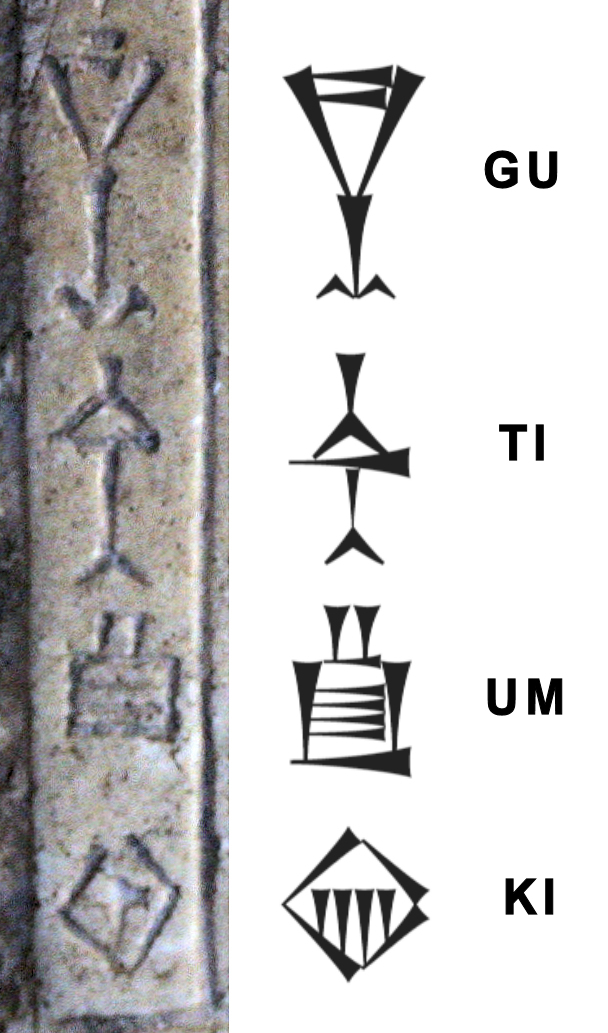
"Gutium"

Approximate location of Gutium

Top: An inscription dated c. 2130 BCE, mentioning the Gutians: "Lugalanatum, prince of Umma ... built the E.GIDRU [Sceptre] Temple at Umma, buried his foundation deposit [and] regulated the orders. At that time, Siium was king of Gutium." The name 𒄖𒋾𒌝𒆠, gu-ti-um^{KI} appears in the last column. Louvre Museum.
Bottom: Approximate location of original Gutium territory

The Guti (/ˈɡuːti/), also known by the derived exonyms Gutians or Guteans, were a people of the ancient Near East who both appeared and disappeared during the Bronze Age. Their homeland was known as Gutium (Sumerian: 𒄖𒌅𒌝𒆠, Gutūm^{KI} or 𒄖𒋾𒌝𒆠, Gutium^{KI}). Conflict between people from Gutium and the Akkadian Empire has been linked to the collapse of the empire, towards the end of the 3rd millennium BCE, although economic factors, climate change and internal strife also played a part. The Guti subsequently overran southern Mesopotamia and formed the short-lived Gutian dynasty of Sumer, overseeing a period of economic and cultural decline. The Sumerian king list suggests that the Guti ruled over Sumer for several generations following the fall of the Akkadian Empire.

By the mid 2nd millennium BCE, use of the name "Gutium", by the Assyrians and Babylonians of Mesopotamia, was extended to include all foreigners from northwestern Ancient Iran, between the Zagros Mountains and the Tigris River. Various tribes and places to the east and northeast, regardless of ethnicity, were often referred to as Gutians or Gutium, and the name no longer referred to one specific people or ethno-linguistic group. For example, Assyrian royal annals use the term Gutians in relation to populations known to have actually been Hurrians, Medes or Mannaeans. As late as the reign of Cyrus the Great of Persia, the famous general Gubaru (Gobryas) was described as the "governor of Gutium" after which the name disappeared from history.

== Origin ==
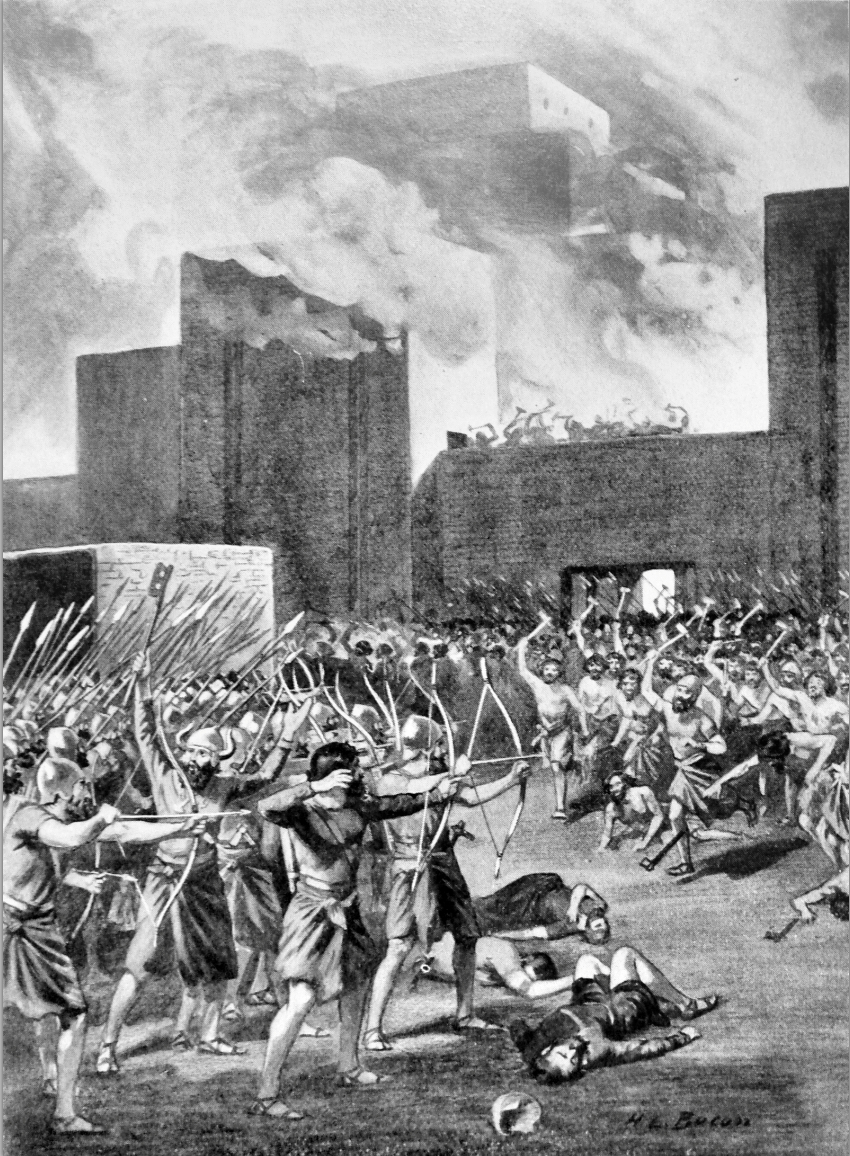
The Gutians capturing a Babylonian city, as Akkadians are making a stand outside their city. Illustration published 1915.

Little is known of the origins, material culture or language of the Guti, as contemporary sources provide few details and no artifacts have been positively identified. According to Boris Piotrovsky and Grigory Bongard-Levin, the language of the Gutian tribes may have been cognate with Hurrian. As the Gutian language lacks a text corpus, apart from some proper names, its similarities to other languages are impossible to verify. The names of Gutian kings suggest that the language was not closely related to any languages of the region at the time, including Sumerian, Akkadian, Hurrian, Hattic, Eblaite, Amorite and Elamite. Most scholars have not accepted attempts to link the personal names of Gutian kings to Indo-European languages, whose presence in the region is not attested until much later.

== History ==
=== 25th to 23rd centuries BCE ===
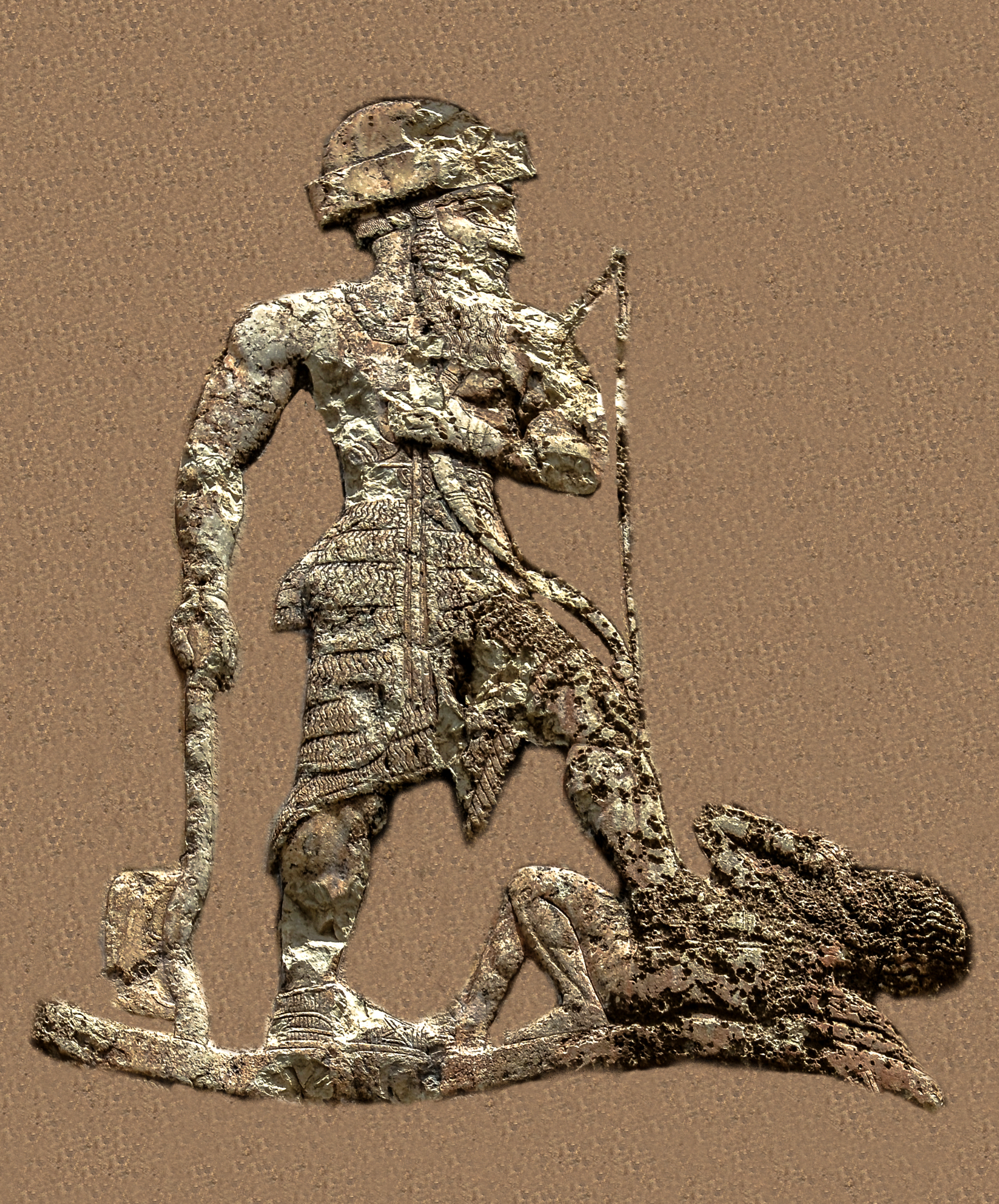
King Anubanini of Lullubi, holding an axe and a bow, trampling a foe. Anubanini rock relief, circa 2300-2000 BC. Sar-I Pul, Iran. The Gutians "were close neighbours, hardly to be distinguished" from the Lullubi.

The Guti appear in texts from c. 17th century BC purported copies of inscriptions proposed to be of Lugal-Anne-Mundu (fl. c. 25th century BC – c. 25th century BCE) of Adab as among the nations providing his empire tribute. These inscriptions locate them between Subartu and Assyria in the north, and Marhashi and Elam in the south. This fragmentary text has been described as a "pseudoautobiographical literary composition".

=== Prominence during the early 22nd century BCE ===
La-erabum, "Great King of Gutiim"
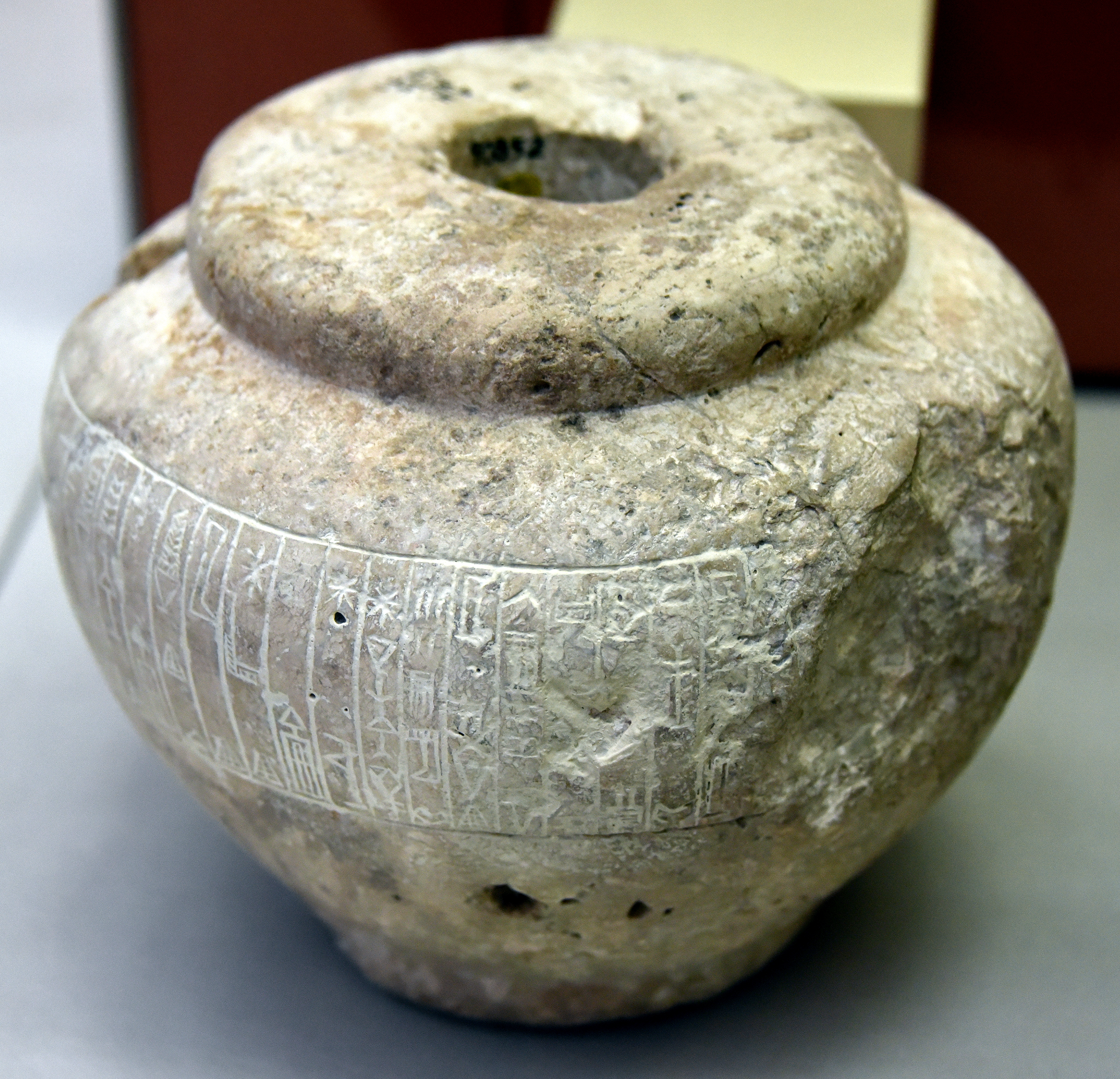
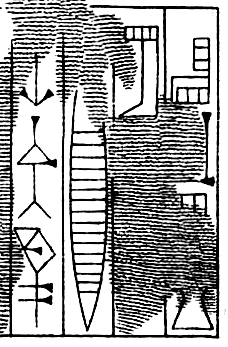
Votive macehead of Gutian king La-erabum, and its inscription "La-eraab, great King of Gutiim" (𒆷𒂍𒊏𒀊 𒁕𒈝 𒈗 𒄖𒋾𒅎 la-e-ra-ab da-num lugal gutiim). The name is quite damaged, and was initially read "Lasiraab". British Museum (BM 90852)

According to the later literary composition Great Revolt against Naram-Sin, Naram-Sin of Akkad's army of 360,000 soldiers defeated the Gutian king Gula'an, despite having 90,000 slain by the Gutians.

The much later Sumerian literary composition Cuthean Legend of Naram-Sin claims Gutium among the lands raided by Annubanini of Lulubum during the reign of Naram-Sin (c. 2254–2218 BCE). Contemporary year-names for Shar-kali-sharri of Akkad indicate that in one unknown year of his reign, Shar-kali-sharri captured Sharlag king of Gutium, while in another year, "the yoke was imposed on Gutium".

During the Akkadian Empire period, the Gutians slowly grew in strength and then established a capital at the Early Dynastic city of Adab. The Gutians eventually overran Akkad, and as the King List tells us, their army also subdued Uruk for hegemony of Sumer, in about 2147~2050 BCE. However, it seems that autonomous rulers soon arose again in a number of city-states, notably Gudea of Lagash, and Upper Mesopotamia and Assyria appear not to have been overrun by the Gutians.

The Gutians seem also to have briefly overrun Elam at around the same time, towards the close of Kutik-Inshushinak's reign (c. 2100 BCE). On a statue of the Gutian king Erridupizir at Nippur, an inscription imitates his Akkadian predecessors, styling him "King of Gutium, King of the Four Quarters".

The Weidner Chronicle (written c. 500 BCE), portrays the Gutian kings as uncultured and uncouth:

Naram-Sin destroyed the people of Babylon, so twice Marduk summoned the forces of Gutium against him. Marduk gave his kingship to the Gutian force. The Gutians were unhappy people unaware how to revere the gods, ignorant of the right cultic practices. Utu-hengal, the fisherman, caught a fish at the edge of the sea for an offering. That fish should not be offered to another god until it had been offered to Marduk, but the Gutians took the boiled fish from his hand before it was offered, so by his august command, Marduk removed the Gutian force from the rule of his land and gave it to Utu-hengal.

=== Decline from the late 22nd century BCE onwards ===
The Sumerian ruler Utu-hengal, Prince of the Sumerian city of Uruk is similarly credited on the King List with defeating the Gutian ruler Tirigan, and removing the Guti from the country in c. 2050 BCE (short chronology).

In his Victory Stele, Utu-hengal wrote about the Gutians:

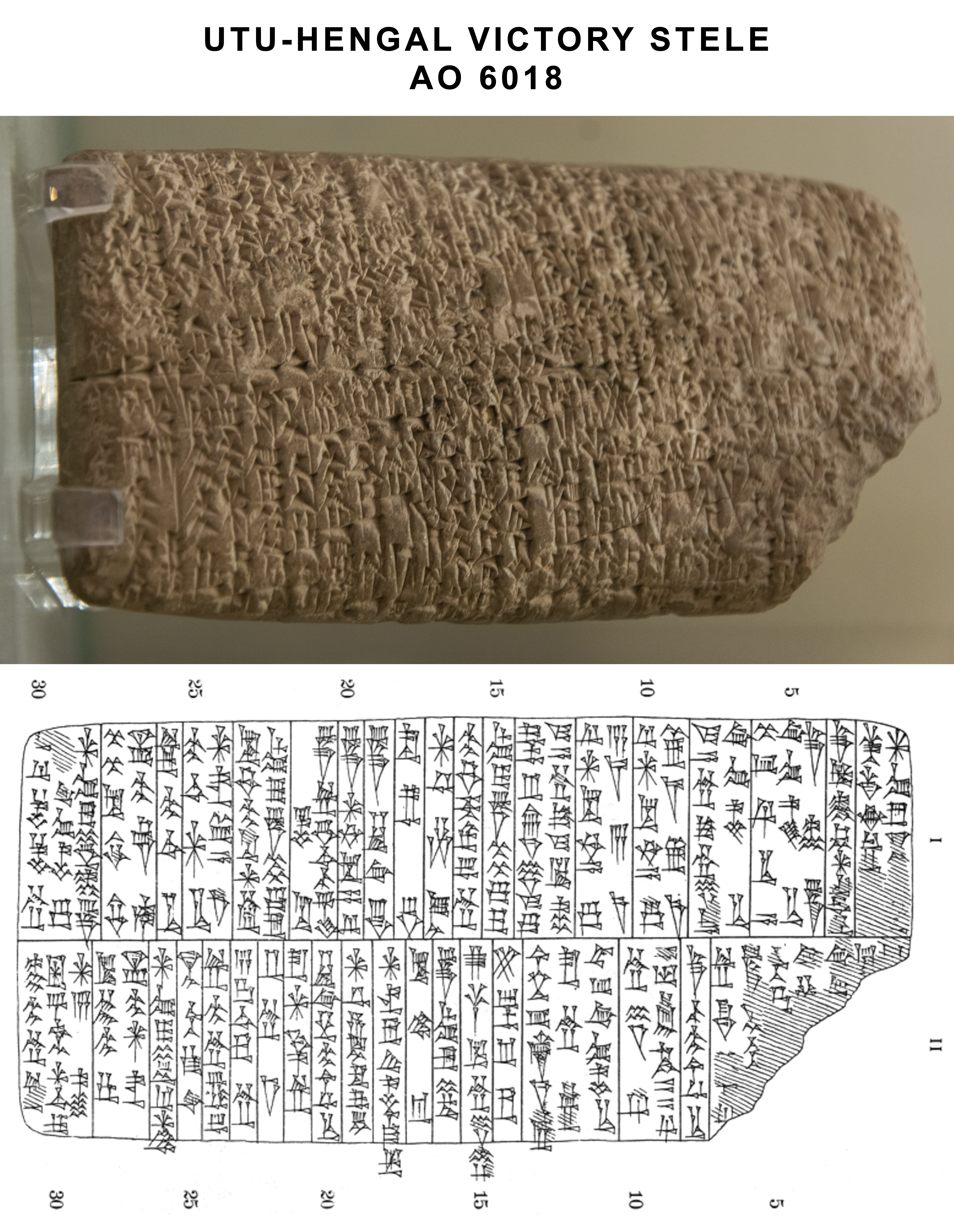
Utu-hengal's victory stele, where he describes the Gutians he vanquished as "the fanged snake of the mountain ranges". Louvre Museum, AO 6018.

Gutium, the fanged snake of the mountain ranges, a people who acted violently against the gods, people who the kingship of Sumer to the mountains took away, who Sumer with wickedness filled, who from one with a wife his wife took away from him, who from one with a child his child took away from him, who produced wickedness and violence within the country ..."

— Victory Stele of Utu-hengal

Following this, Ur-Nammu of Ur ordered the destruction of Gutium. The year 11 of king Ur-Nammu also mentions the "year Gutium was destroyed". However, according to a Sumerian epic, Ur-Nammu died in battle with the Gutians, after having been abandoned by his own army.

A Babylonian text (ETCSL 2.1.5) from the early 2nd millennium refers to the Guti as having "human intelligence but canine { instincts } { (some mss. have instead:) feelings } and monkeys' features."

Some biblical scholars believe that the Guti may be the Qoa, named with the Shoa and Pekod as enemies of Jerusalem in Ezekiel 23:23, which was probably written in the 6th century BCE.
