= Waddell's chronology =

Chronological list by British author Laurence Waddell

Waddell's chronology or Waddell's king list is an Ancient Near Eastern chronology developed by the British Laurence Waddell in his book, Egyptian Civilization: Its Sumerian Origin and Real Chronology, published in 1930.

Waddell's correlations have not been generally accepted or well regarded. Conventional lists separate Sargon from Menes by around five hundred years. Commenting on this and other works, the Dictionary of National Biography says "These works, containing much painstaking research and impressive to many, did not win the approval of experts."

Waddell's primary chronology was compiled from various Sumerian king lists, Egyptian list of pharaohs, the Bhagavata Purana, Mahabharata, Rigveda and numerous Indus Valley civilization seals and other monuments and relics and sources, some of which he had deciphered himself. It was entitled "Dated Chronological List of Sumerian or Early Aryan Kings from the Rise of Civilization to the Kassi Dynasty" and documented an alleged list of world emperors as follows:

No.	Date BCE (approximate)	Names in Sumerian King Lists and monuments	Name On Sumerian Kinglist	Indian list names
1	First Sumerian Dynasty; 3378–3349 BCE	Ukusi(kish dynasty) of Ukhu City(Result of translating ka's tomb inscription as Sargon's) or Udu, Uduin, or Odin, Indar, Indra, Induru, Dur, Pur, Sakh, Sagaga, Zagg, Gaur, Alulim, or Adar		Ikshvāku or Indra or Sakkō or Pururavas
2	3348–3337 BCE	Azag Ama Basam or Bakus, Tasia, Mukhla, Gin, Gan or Kan or Nimrod, Nimmirud		Ayus, Ama-Basu or Bikukshi-Nimi
	3336–3273 BCE	Azag Bakus or Gan at Unuk, Enoch or Erech City		As Above
3	Second Sumerian Dynasty; 3272–3248 BCE	Naksha, Enuzu, Anenzu, Unnusha, In, Enu		Nahusha, Anenas or Janak
4	3247–3242 BCE	Udu, Uduk		Udā-vasu, Yadu, Yayati, (?) King Puru
5	3241–3312 BCE	Zimugun, Dumuzid, the Shepherd, Tammuz		Janamejaya or Jina
6	3211–3206 BCE	Uziwitar, Usi-water, Tara		Vishnu, Vishtara or Wishtara
7	3205–3195 BCE	Mutin Ugun		Matinara
8	3194–3184 BCE	Imuashshu or Pishmana		Vishamsu or Tamsu
9	3183–3181 BCE	Naili (or Nandu) Iaxa Sumaddi or Duag		Anila (?) Ucchaya, Dushyanta or (?) Sunanta
-	3180–2751 BCE Long Chronology	The Great Gap of 430 years with 26 (or 57) Kings		Uruash's Dynasty of "Paunch"
10	****	Ubara-Tutu, Baratutu, Bardū, Barti Pirtu		Burata, Brihad, Prithu
11	****	Gaudumu or Dūdumunu		Gautama, Dhundhumara
12	****	Dutu-Gindara		Dwat, Candra-ashva, Dvarka
13	****	Azag, or Ashita-ab		Aja-midha or Siteshu
14	****	Ishzax or Gishax Gamesh		Chaxus, Riksha, Rucaka or Ruk-meshu
15	****	Uruash-Khād, Urusag-Khaddu, Barama'hasha or Arwasag (c. 3100 BCE)		Haryashva or Barmyashva
18	****	Magdal, A-Magdal, Mukh		Mudgala or Mogallo
19	****	Bidashnadi, Bidsar, Biugun or Biguaxu		Badhryashya, L'asenadi or B'ujyu
20	****	Enun-nad Enash-nadi		Yuvanashwa
21	****	Tarsi (Ene- or "divine")or Dixxi (Di- or "divine")		Dāsa (Divo- or "divine") or Trasa Dasyu I
22	****	Medi or Meti		Mettiyo or Mitrayu
23	****	Kiuga, Mūkuda		Cyavana or Muckunda
24	****	Tarsi II, Dix-saax or (?)Shu-Dix		Su-Dāsa, Dussaha or Trasa Dasyu II
25	****	Tizama or Tizkar, Anda		Somaka, Sambhuta
26	****	Rumau or Pashipadda		Jantu
27	****	("Mesanipadda"), Uruduki Raman Duruashi-padda or Rutasa Rama, Rama		Prishada or Suvarna Roman, Rama
28	****	("Anni-padda") (c. 2900 BCE)		Drupada I, Hrashva Roman, Dropa, or Rohidashva
29	****	Eama		Vyoman, Vasumanas
30	****	Biama		Jimūta
31	****	Paunukha, ("?Meshkalamdug")		Bhanu or Ban-kirti
**	****	illegible		Satya-brata
**	****	illegible		Harish-candra II
**	****	illegible		Harita or Rohit-ashwa II
32	****	Gungun, Kingubi-Dudu		Cuncu or Dhundu
33	****	Mama-gal		Vijaya
34	****	Kalbu or Kalburu		B'aruka or Ruruki
35	****	Tuke		Vri-Taka or Dhri-Taka
36	****	Bara-Gina, Puru-gin, Ur-Zababa, or Pardu-Bazum		Pra-Cinvat, B'arad-Vaja, Bahū or Bahuka
35	****	Urukagina, Urudu-Gina, or Urukka-Gina		Puru II
**	**** BC	Fall of Kish and Lagash		
36a	2750–2726 BCE	Zaggisi or Saggisi or Lugal-zage-si	Lugal-zage-si	
**	2725 BCE	Fall of Uruk		
37	Sargon's Dynasty; 2725–2671 BCE	Guni, Shar-Guni, Kin or Sargon	Sargon of Akkad	Kuni Sha-Kuni or Sagara
37a	2670–2656 BCE	Rimush, Mush Uru	Rimush of Akkad	-
38	First Egyptian Dynasty; 2655–2641 BCE	Man-ishtishu or Menes	Manishtushu	Son of Sargon, Asa-Manja(Solar dynasty), Manasyu(Lunar dynasty)
39	2640–2585 BCE	Naram-sin	Naram-Sin of Akkad	Grandson of Sargon, Anjana, Ansu-mat or Karamba
40	2584–2561 BCE	Shar-kali-sharri	Shar-kali-sharri	Son of Naram-sin, Kunti-jit, Khatawanga, Dilīppa
-	2560-2558 BCE	Irgigi, Nigigi, Imi, Nanum, Iama (in inter-regnum) four kings	Irgigi; Imi; Nanum; Ilulu	Bhagi-ratha
41	2557-2537 BCE	Dudu	Dudu of Akkad	Dhundu
42	2536-2522 BCE	Shu-turul, Shūdur-kib	Shu-Durul	Suhotra II, Shruta Shrutāyas
43	2nd Erech Dynasty; 2521-2519 BCE	Uru-Nigin (? Nikin Uru of seal WSC. 390	Ur-ningin	Nabhin, Nābhāga
44	2518-2513 BCE	Urish-Ginar	Ur-gigir	Harish-Candra or Ambarisha
44a	2512-2507 BCE	Tardu (or Kudda)	Kuda	(?) RathiTara "great-grandson of Ambarūshu"
45	2506-2502 BCE	Ba-Sha-nini (or -ama)	Puzur-ili	Sindhu-dhipa, Sanjaya
	2501-2494 BCE	Uru-ash (or -an) -uta	Ur-Utu (or Lugal-melem)	-
46	Guti Dynasty; 2493-2452 BCE; Kusha Dynasty	Guti occupation without kings		Ayunāyus (or ? Duthaliyas, k. of Khatti)
47	2451-2449 BCE	Muruta		Mūrtaya
	2448-2443 BCE	In Kishu or Gishu	Inkišuš	Kusha
	2442-2437 BCE	Irilla Tax (or Warla Gaba)	Sarlagab (or Zarlagab)	-
	2436-2431 BCE	Dug-me or Ug-me	Shulme (or Yarlagash)	-
48	2430-2425 BCE	Eamamesh (or Kashushamama)	Elulmeš (or Silulumeš or Silulu)	Kushāmba or Sarva-Kāma
	2424-2420 BCE	Inima Bakies, Baesses, Bakus or Basam	Inimabakeš (or Duga)	Basu II or Bhaji
	2419-2414 BCE	Iziaush	Igešauš (or Ilu-An)	-
49	2413-2399 BCE	Iārla Tax or Dax	Yarlagab	Su Dāsa II
	2398-2396 BCE	Ibate	Ibate of Gutium	
	2395-2393 BCE	Iārla Gash or Kashushamama (2nd term)	Yarla (or Yarlangab)	Kushāmba (2nd term)
	2392- BCE	Basium, Basam or Bakus (2nd term)	Kurum	Basu II or Bhaji (2nd term)
	2391-2389 BCE	Nikīm or Nigin	Apilkin	-
	2388-2387 BCE	Lasi-rubum or La-Sirab	La-erabum	Sarva-bhauma
	2386-2385 BCE	Irarum	Irarum	-
	2384- BCE	Darranūm	Ibranum	-
50	2383-2382 BCE	Khāblum or Khab-Kalamu	Hablum	Kalmāshu-pāda
	2381-2375 BCE	Suratāsh Sin or Sarati Gubi Sin	Puzur-Suen	Sruta, Upa-Gupta
	2374-2368 BCE	Guda, Iārla Guashda or Gudia	Yarlaganda	Gādhi
	2367-2361 BCE	En-Ridi-Pizir, Pisha Ruddu	Unknown	Vishva-Ratha (son of Gādhi)
	2360- BCE	Tiri-gan	Tirigan	Trishanku
51	3rd Erech Dynasty; 2360-62353 BCE	Ashukhamukh, or Utukhe-gal	Utu-hengal	Ashmaka
52	Third Dynasty of Ur; 2352-2335 BCE	Uruash-Zikim	Ur-Namma	Uru-Ricika Mūlaka
	2334-2277 BCE	Dungi or Duk-gin (Shamu-)	Shulgi	Dagni or Dagni-Jama
	2276-2268 BCE	Purash-Sin ("Bur-Sin"	Amar-Suena	Parashu-Rāma (and his massacre) Dasharatha or (?)
53	2267-2259 BCE	Suash-Sin ("Gimil-Sin")	Shu-Suen	Shata-ratha or Sushena Shata-ratha
54	2258-2233 BCE	Il-Ibil-Sin	Ibbi-Suen	Il-Ibila or Ilivila
55	Isin Dynasty; 2332-2200 BCE	Ishbi-Ashuurra	Ishbi-Erra	Vishva-saha
56	2199-2190 BCE	Katini-Kat (or Shu-Lilishu	Shu-Ilishu	Khatvanga or Dilipa
57	2189-2169 BCE	Itiash-Dakhu	Iddin-Dagan	Dirga-bahu
58	2163-2149 BCE	Ishshibash-Dakhu	Ishme-Dagan	Raghu
59	2148-2138 BCE	Libiash Ugun	Lipit-Eshtar	Aja
60	2137-2110 BCE	Dashashi-urash, Muru	Ur-Ninurta	Dasha-ratha
61	2109-2089 BCE	Amar-Sin, ("Bur-Sin II")	Bur-Suen	Rama or Rama-Chandra
62	2088-2084 BCE	Libi (Insakh)	Lipit-Enlil	Lava and Kusha
	2083-2076 BCE	Ashurra Iwiti or Urra Iwiti	Erra-imitti (8 Years)	-
63	2075-2052 BCE	Insakh-bani	Enlil-bani (24 Years)	Atithi or Suhotra IV
64	2051- BCE	Zāmbi (3)	Zambiya (3)	Nishadha
		Tenirpisha (4)	Iter-pisha (4)	
		Urdukuga	Ur-du-kuga (4)	
		Sin Mapish (II)	Suen-magir (11)	
65	-2007 BCE	Damiq-ilushu	Damiq-ilishu the son of Suen-magir	Nala
66	First Babylonian Dynasty as emperors 2023-2004 BCE	Anuha-Mubalit ("Sin-Muballit" (20, of which four as emperor)		Nabha or Nabhas
67	2003-1961 BCE	Khammu-Rabi or "Great Lotus"		Pundarika or "Great Lotus"
68	1960-1923 BCE	Sāmsui-Uduna		Kshema-Dhanvan
69	1922-1895 BCE	Abieshu'a		Devānīka
70	1894-1858 BCE	Ammi-Satana or Ammi-Ditana		Ruru or (?) Suto-rusta
71	1857-1837 BCE	Ammi-Saraga or Ammi-Suduga		Ahi-nagu
72	1836-1806 BCE	Sāmsu-Satana		Sudhanvan or Pariyatra
73	Sea-Land Dynasty; 1805-1791 BCE	Sakhari-Bal		Sahasra-Bala or Bala (with separate line)
74	Kassite Dynasty; 1790-1775 BCE	Xatal ("Gandash")		Sthala or Gaya
75	1774-1753 BCE	Agu-um		Auka or Uktha
76	1752-1745 BCE	Bisuiru ("Kashtiliash")		Vajra-nābha
77	1744-1737 BCE	Ushigu		Shankha
78	1736- BCE	Abisuttash		Ab'Yutthit-ashva or Dhyushit-ashva
