= Scolinos =

Scolinos is a surname. Notable people with the surname include:

- John Scolinos (1918–2009), American baseball and football coach
- Tasia Scolinos (born 1972), American attorney and politician
