= Tasia =

Tasia is a feminine given name. Notable people and fictional characters with the name include:

== Real people ==
- Tasia Athanasiou, Greek ambassador
- Tasia Scolinos, American lawyer and public official
- Tasia Seumanufagai (born 1989), New Zealand rugby league footballer
- Tasia Sherel, American actress and model
- Tasia Tanner (born 2002), American freestyle skier
- Tasia Valenza, American actress
- Tasia Zalar, Australian actress and musician

== Fictional characters ==
- Tasia (Mortal Kombat), fictional swordswoman and ninja master in the 2000 game Mortal Kombat: Special Forces
- Tasia Tamblyn, in the science fiction novel series The Saga of Seven Suns

== See also ==
- Aajuitsup Tasia (lit. 'long lake'), lake in Qeqqata municipality, Greenland
- Alejandro Puente Tasias (born 1994), Spanish alpine skier
