= Igigi of Akkad =

King of the Akkadian Kingdom

Igigi 𒄿𒄀𒄀
- King of Sumer
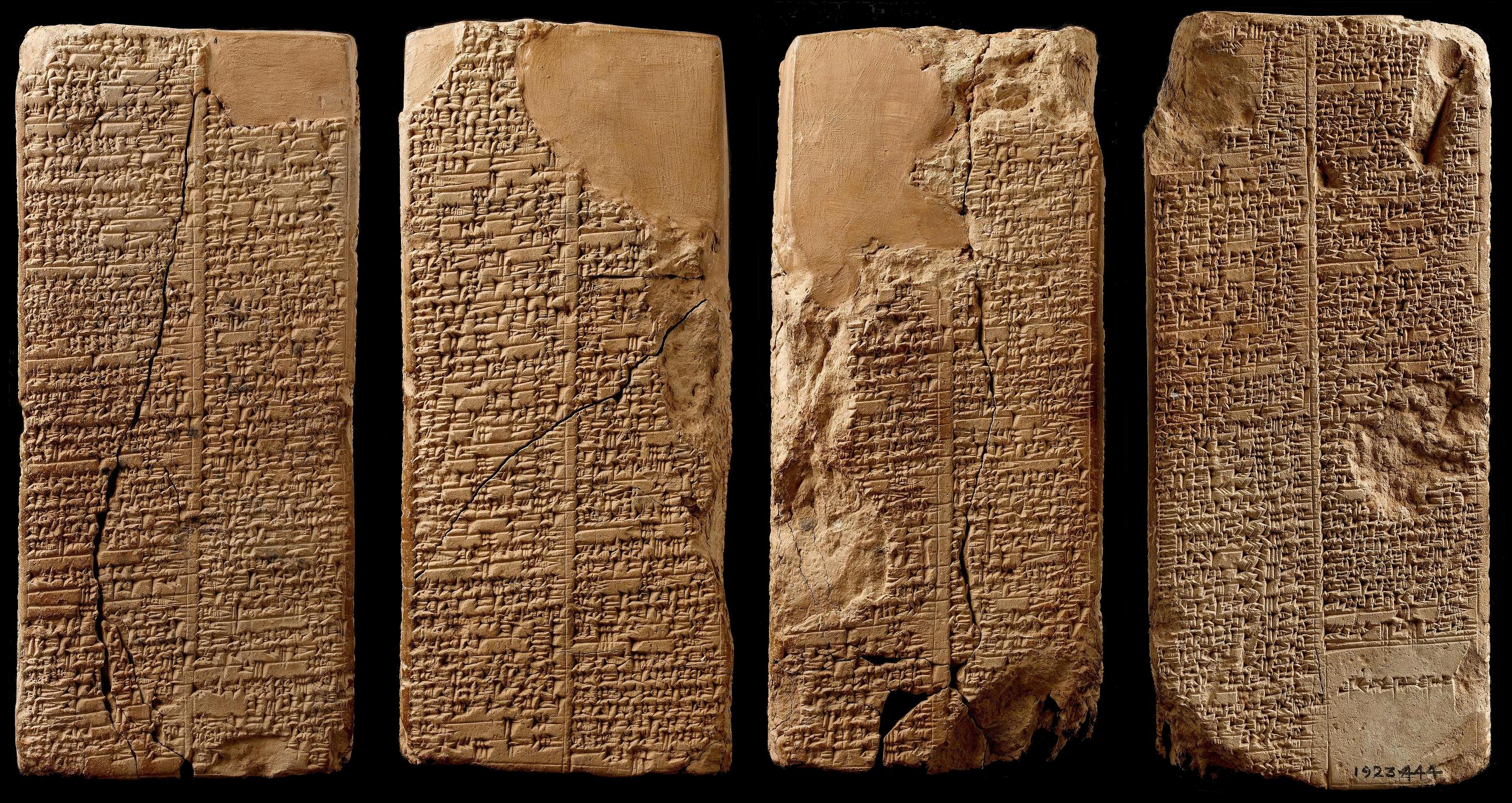

King of Akkad
- Reign: c. 2193 – c. 2192 BC
- Predecessor: Possibly Shar-Kali-Sharri
- Successor: Possibly Imi
- Died: c. 2192 BC

Igigi (died c. 2192 BC), according to the Sumerian King List, was one of four rivals (the others being Ilulu, Imi, and Nanum) vying to be king of Akkad during a three-year period following the death of Shar-Kali-Sharri. This chaotic period came to an end when Dudu consolidated his power over the realm.

== See also ==
- List of Mesopotamian dynasties
- History of Mesopotamia
