= Shu-turul =

King of the Akkadian Empire

Shu-turul 𒋗𒉣𒇬𒍌
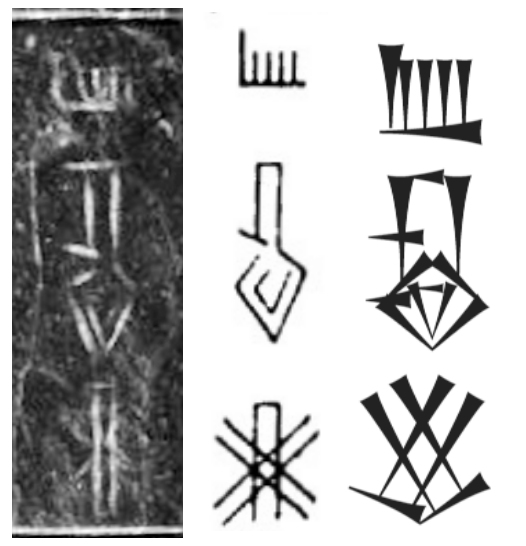
- The name "Shu-turul" (𒋗𒄙𒄒, shu-tur2-ul3) on the macehead inscription, with transcription in standard Sumero-Akkadian cuneiform

King of Akkad
- Reign: c. 2168 – c. 2154 BC
- Predecessor: Dudu
- Successor: Position abolished
- Died: c. 2154 BC
- Father: Dudu

Shu-turul (Shu-durul, 𒋗𒄙𒄒, shu-tur2-ul3 also Šu-Turul; died c. 2154 BC) was the last king of Akkad, ruling for 15 years according to the Sumerian king list. It indicates that he succeeded his father Dudu. A few artifacts, seal impressions etc. attest that he held sway over a greatly reduced Akkadian territory that included Kish, Tutub, Nippur, and Eshnunna. The Diyala River also bore the name "Shu-durul" at the time.

Map depicting ancient cities of Sumer. The area under the control of Shu-Turul was an area that contained Kish, Tutub, Nippur, and Eshunna.

== Sumerian King List ==
The king list asserts that Akkad was then conquered, and the hegemony returned to Uruk following his reign. It further lists six names of an Uruk dynasty; however only two of these six rulers, Ur-nigin and Ur-gigir, have been confirmed through archaeology. With Akkad's collapse, the Gutians, who had established their capital at Adab, became the regional power, though several of the southern city-states such as Uruk, Ur, and Lagash also declared independence around this time.

== Inscriptions ==
A few inscriptions in his name are known. One, on an administrative clay sealing found at Kish reads:

"Šu-Turul the mighty, king of Agade"

A clay sealing of Shu-turl was found at Nippur. Another reading "[S]u-Turul, the [m]ighty, [ki]ng of [Aga]de: ... [(is) his servant]." was found at Tell Asmar.

A votive mace, made of dark green marble, is also known with an inscription mentioning Shu-turul and the dedication of a temple to Nergal:

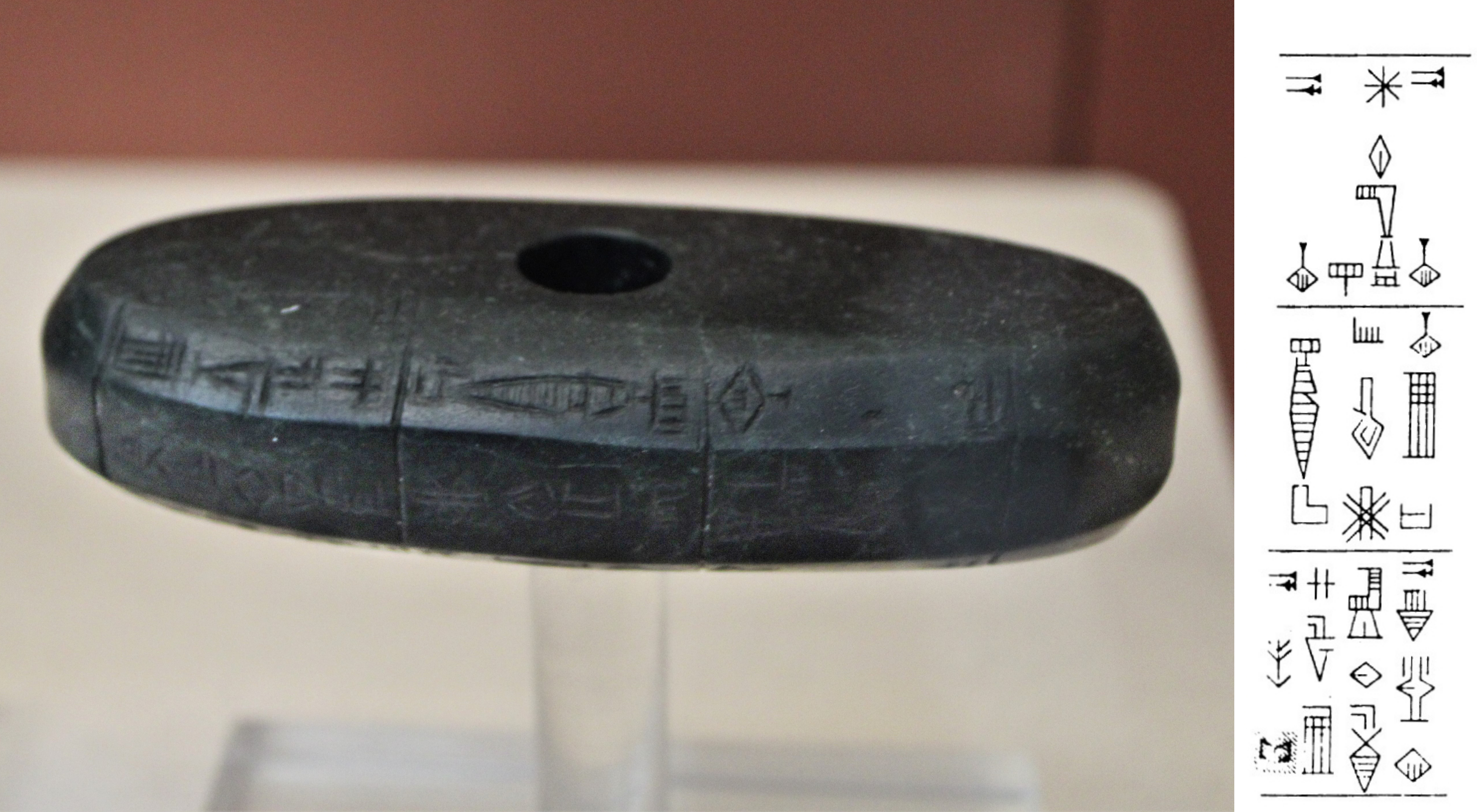
Votive mace of Shu-turul, with an inscription with his name on the flange. Room 56, display case 11, British Museum

𒀀𒈾 𒀭𒊊𒀕𒃲 𒀀𒈾 𒈾𒂍𒋛 𒋗𒄙𒄒 𒈗𒌷 𒀀𒂵𒉈𒆠 𒆷𒁀?𒋳 𒉺𒀠𒂍 𒀀𒈬𒊒
a-na {d}ne3-iri11-gal a-na na-'a3-si szu-tur2-ul3 szar3-ri2 a-ga-de3{ki} la-ba-'a3?-szum szabra e2 a mu-ru

"To Nergal, for the life of Shu-turul king of Akkad, Laba-erishum the palace soothsayer has dedicated this"

— Mace of Shu-turul (British Museum, BM 114703)

A 17 centimeter long copper axe, acquired on the antiquities market, reads "Su-Turul, the mighty, king of Agade".

A tablet found at Adab contains the year name "year when Shu-Durul assumed the kingdom".

A one manna weight (in the shape of a duck), now held at the Urfa Museum, is inscribed with the name of an official of Akkadian ruler Shu-durul was recovered from a looted context in Titris Hoyuk.

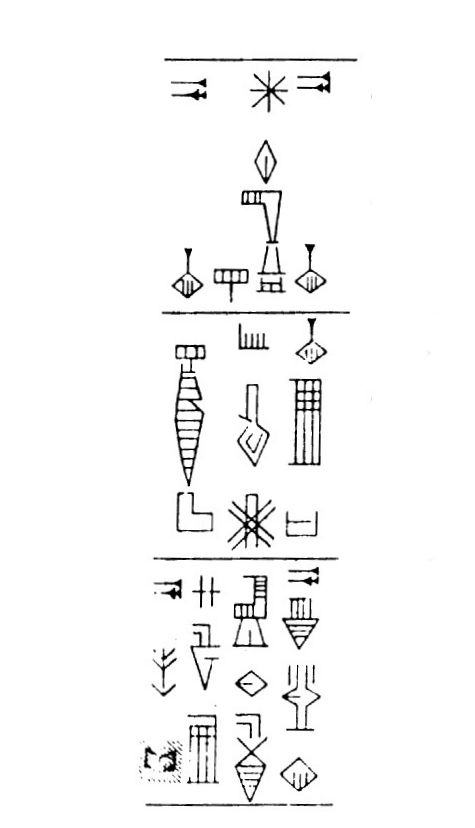
Transcription of the inscription on the flange of the votive hammer of Shu-turul

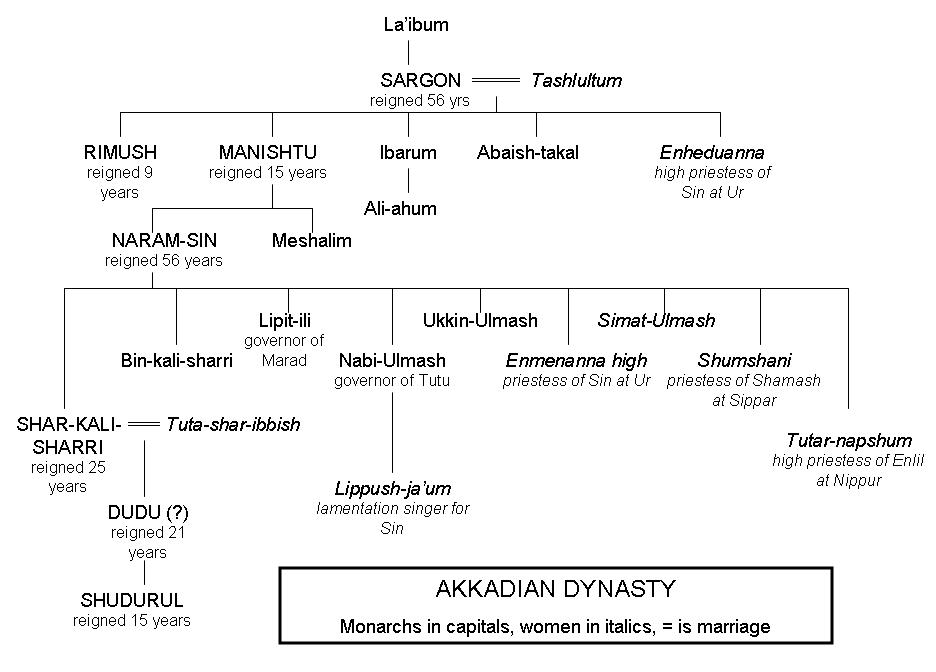
Shu-turul in the Akkadian family tree

== See also ==
- List of kings of Akkad
- List of Mesopotamian dynasties

== Sources ==
Regnal titles
Preceded by Dudu	King of Akkad; King of Kish, Uruk, Lagash, and Umma; Overlord of Elam c. 2168 – c. 2154 BC	Succeeded by Position abolished
