= Imi of Akkad =

Imi 𒄿𒈪
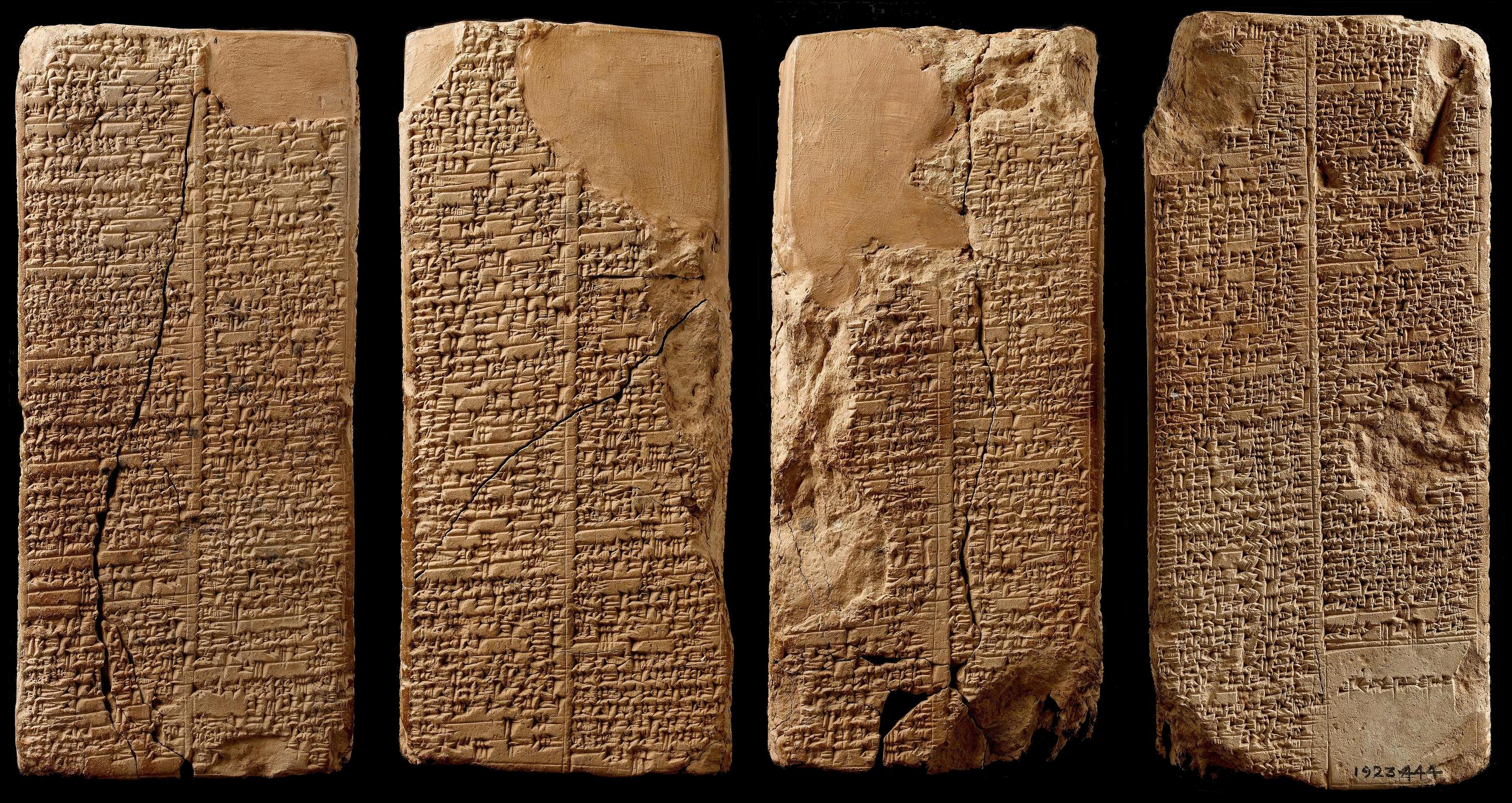

King of Akkad
- Reign: c. 2192 – c. 2191 BC
- Predecessor: Possibly Igigi
- Successor: Possibly Nanum
- Died: c. 2191 BC

Imi (died c. 2191 BC), according to the Sumerian King List, was one of four rivals (the others being Igigi, Ilulu, and Nanum) vying to be king of Akkad during a three-year period following the death of Shar-Kali-Sharri. This chaotic period came to an end when Dudu consolidated his power over the realm.

== See also ==
- List of Mesopotamian dynasties
- History of Mesopotamia
