= Nanum of Akkad =

King of the Akkadian Empire

Nanum 𒈾𒉡𒌝
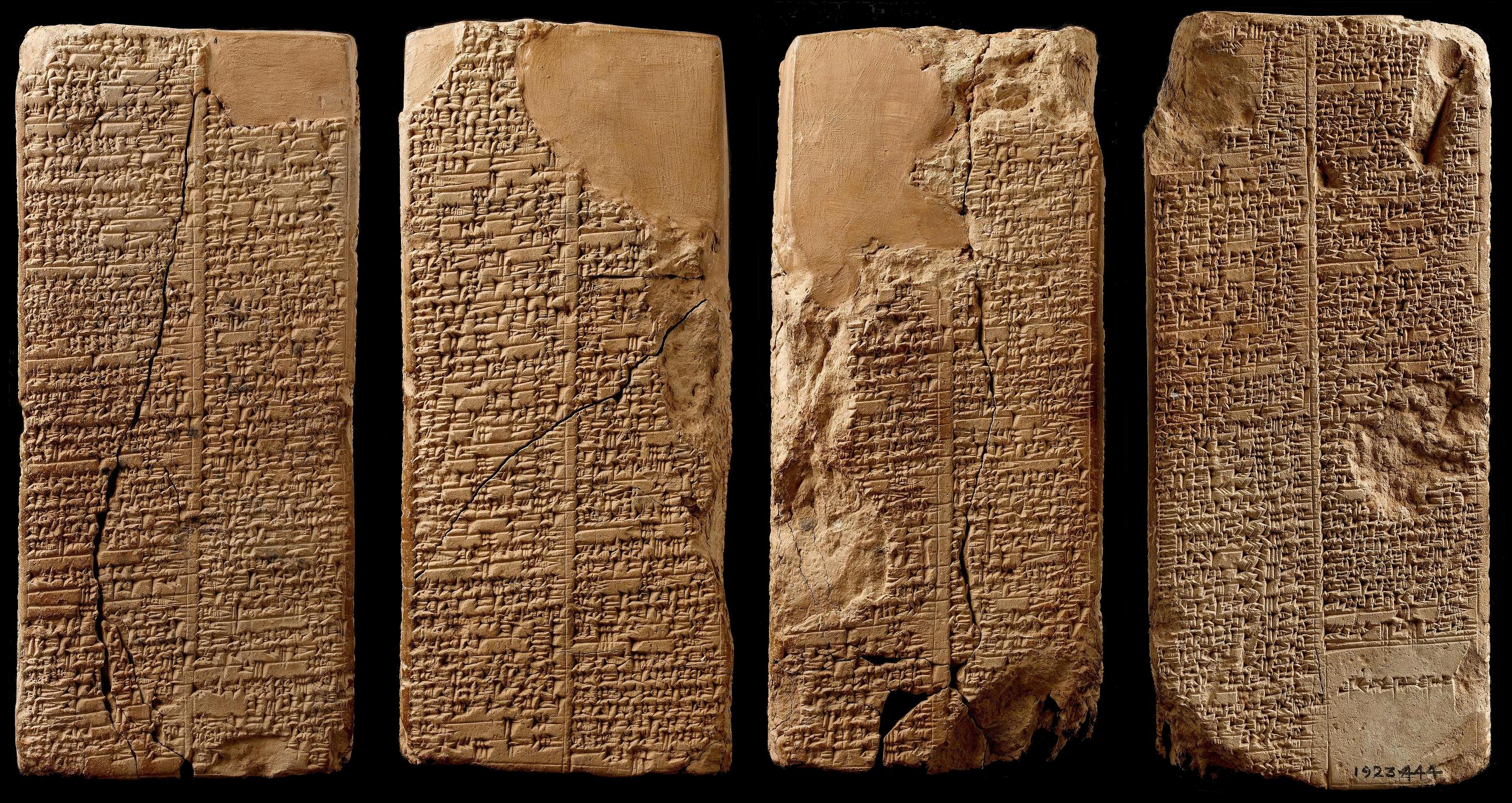

King of Akkad
- Reign: c. 2191 – c. 2190 BC
- Predecessor: Possibly Imi
- Successor: Possibly Ilulu
- Died: c. 2190 BC

Nanum or Nanium (died c. 2190 BC), according to the Sumerian King List, was one of four rivals (the others being Ilulu, Igigi, and Imi) vying to be king of Akkad during a three-year period following the death of Shar-Kali-Sharri. This chaotic period came to an end when Dudu consolidated his power over the realm.

== See also ==
- List of Mesopotamian dynasties
- History of Mesopotamia
