= List of kings of Akkad =

King of Akkad
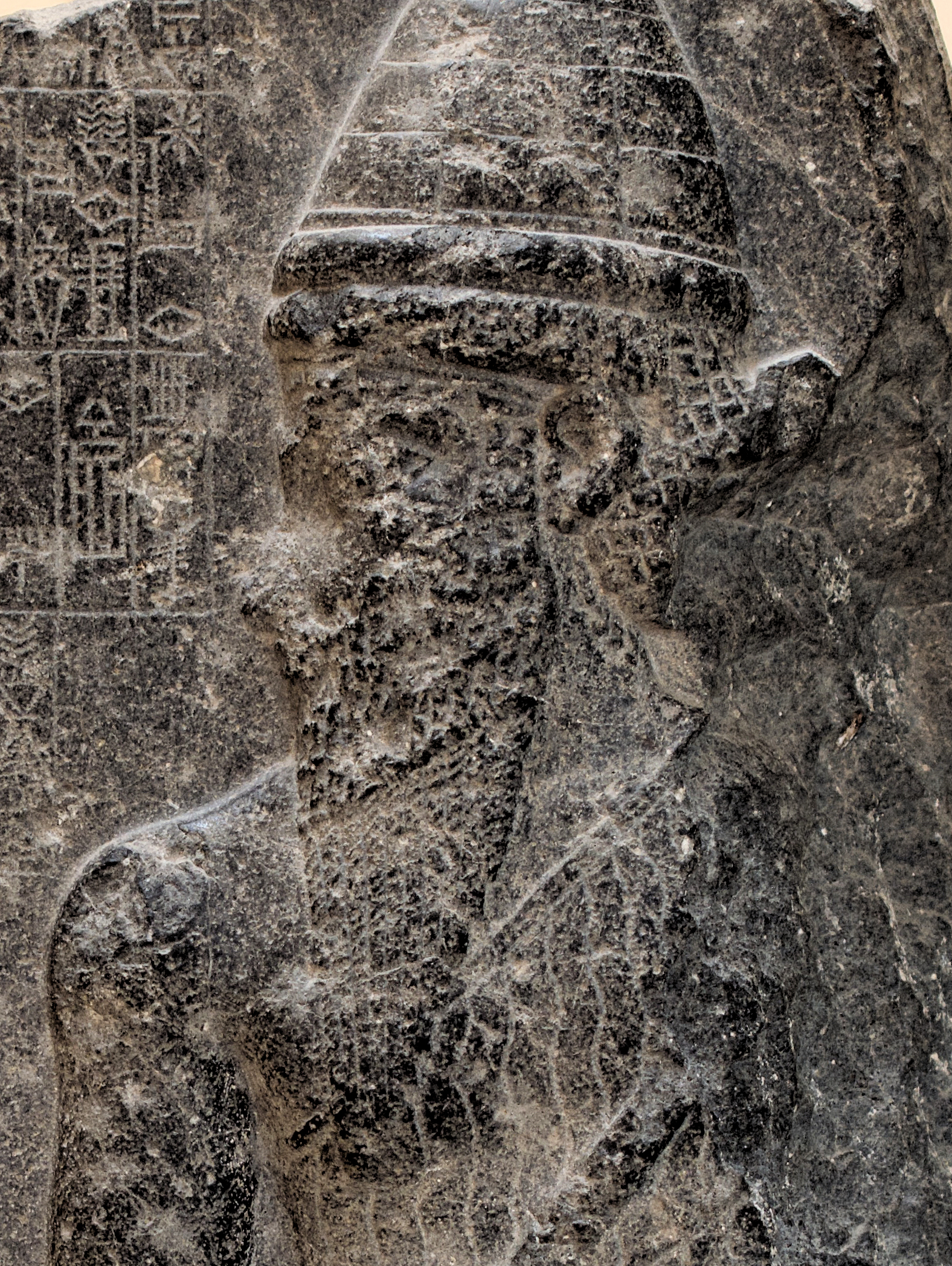
- Naram-Sin c. 2254–2218 BC; Under which the Akkadian Empire reached its greatest extent

Details
- First monarch: Sargon
- Last monarch: Shu-turul
- Formed: c. 2334 BC
- Abolished: c. 2154 BC; 530 BC (King of Sumer and Akkad)
- Appointer: Divine right, hereditary

The king of Akkad (Akkadian: šar māt Akkadi, lit. 'king of the land of Akkad') was the ruler of the city of Akkad and its empire, in ancient Mesopotamia. In the 3rd millennium BC, from the reign of Sargon of Akkad to the reign of his great-grandson Shar-Kali-Sharri, the Akkadian Empire represented the dominant power in Mesopotamia and the first known great empire.

The empire would rapidly collapse following the rule of its first five kings, owing to internal instability and foreign invasion, probably resulting in Mesopotamia re-fracturing into independent city-states, but the power that Akkad had briefly exerted ensured that its prestige and legacy would be claimed by monarchs for centuries to come. Ur-Nammu of Ur, who founded the Neo-Sumerian Empire and reunified most of Mesopotamia, created the title "King of Sumer and Akkad" which would be used until the days of the Achaemenid Empire.

== History ==
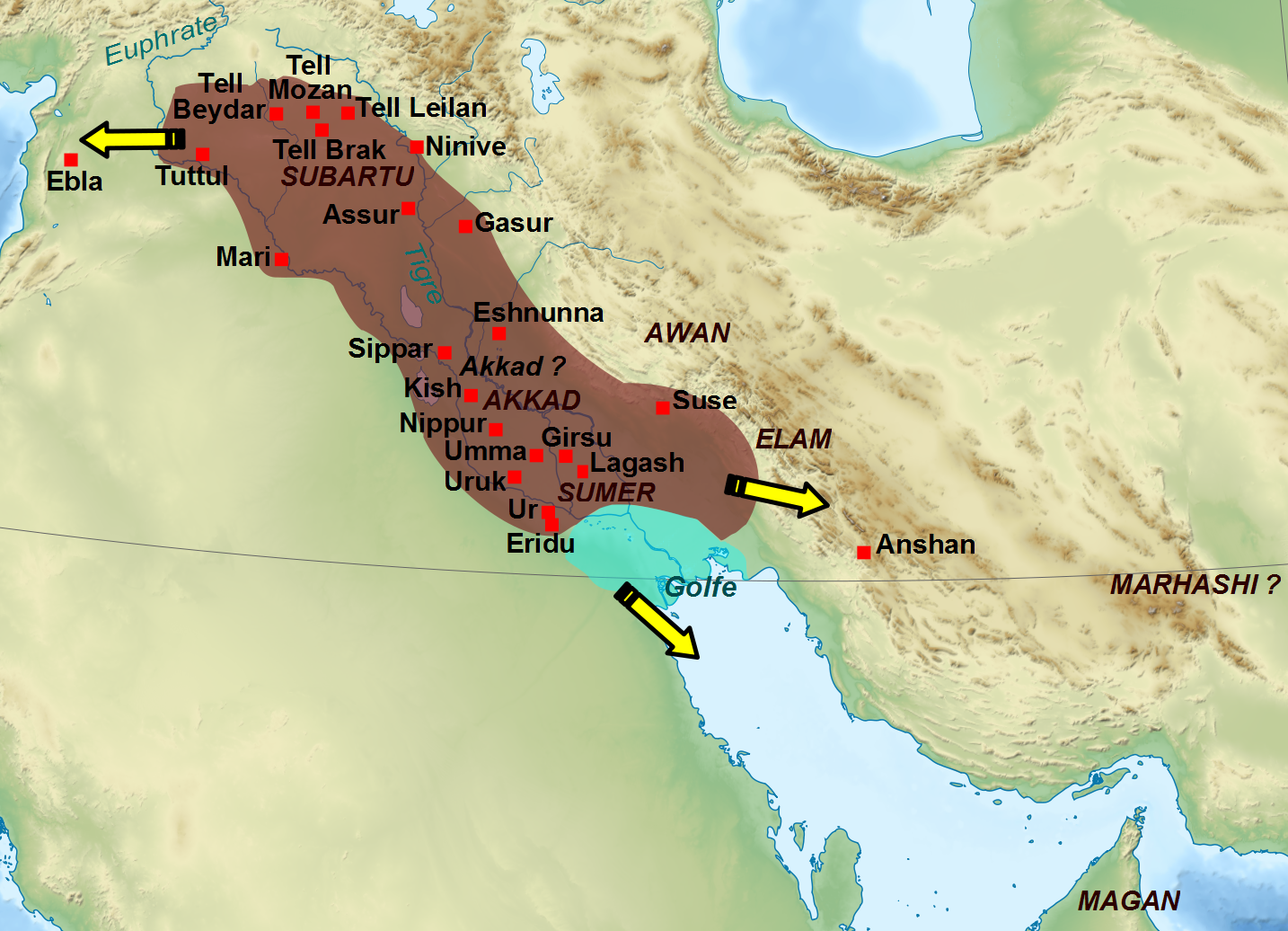
Map of the Akkadian Empire at its greatest extent, under Naram-Sin, with directions of successful military campaigns marked

Although Sargon of Akkad is often referred to as the "founder" of Akkad, the city itself probably existed before his rule; a pre-Sargonic inscription refers to it by name and the name "Akkad" itself is not actually of the Akkadian language of Sargon and his successors. Sargon's reign does however mark the transition of Akkad from a city-state into the first known great empire, with the Akkadian king ruling all Mesopotamia. His rise to power began with the defeat of the Sumerian king Lugal-zage-si, who had ruled Lower Mesopotamia from Uruk, and the conquest of his empire. Through military campaigns, Sargon subjugated regions as far west as the Mediterranean and as far north as Assyria, which he boasted of in his inscriptions. (Note: Stephanie Dalley proposes that these sources may have originally referred to Sargon II of the Assyria rather than Sargon of Akkad.)

Sargon's successors consolidated his vast realm and continued expanding the borders of the Akkadian Empire. Sargon's grandson and the fourth king of Akkad, Naram-Sin, brought the empire to its greatest extent and assumed a new title to illustrate his great power, King of the Four Corners, which referenced the entire world. He was also the first king in Mesopotamia to be deified in his lifetime, being addressed as "the god of Akkad".

Although at least seven kings would rule Akkad after him, the Akkadian Empire quickly collapsed after Naram-Sin's reign and prominent central authority under a single king would not be restored in Mesopotamia until the rise of the Neo-Sumerian Empire. It's likely that the region reverted to local governance under kings of city-states in the time between the two empires. A major cause of this collapse was the invasion of Mesopotamia by a people referred to as the Gutians, who would be defeated and driven away by the founder of the Neo-Sumerian Empire, Ur-Nammu.

== List of rulers ==
The following list should not be considered complete:

#	Depiction	King	Approx. date of reign	Succession	Notes
Akkadian period (c. 2335 – c. 2154 BC)
Sargonic dynasty (c. 2335 – c. 2193 BC)
"Then the reign of Uruk was abolished and the kingship was taken to Akkad." — Sumerian King List (SKL)
1st		Sargon 𒈗𒁺; Šarru-ukīn	r. c. 2335 – c. 2279 BC (MC) r. c. 2270 – c. 2215 BC (SC) (54, 55, or 56 years)	Possibly son of La'ibum	Introduced the title, "King of the Universe"; Embarked on campaigns to subjugate the entire Fertile Crescent and founded what is oftentimes regarded as the first empire in history by invading, conquering, and/or destroying several Mesopotamian cities including: Uruk, Umma, Ur, Lagash, Adab, Nippur, Kish, Kazallu, Der, Simurrum, Uru'a, Parahshum, Awan, Susa, Mari, Tuttul, and Ebla
2nd		Rimush 𒌷𒈬𒍑; Ri-mu-uš	r. c. 2279 – c. 2270 BC (MC) r. c. 2214 – c. 2206 BC (SC) (7, 9, or 15 years)	Son of Sargon	Held the title, "King of the Universe"; Faced widespread revolts, reconquered, and/or embarked on victorious campaigns against the cities of: Ur, Umma, Adab, Lagash, Der, Kazallu, Barakhshe, and Elam from rebellious governors; Possibly assassinated by his courtiers
3rd		Manishtushu 𒈠𒀭𒅖𒌅𒋢; Ma-an-ish-tu-su	r. c. 2270 – c. 2255 BC (MC) r. c. 2205 – c. 2191 BC (SC) (7 or 15 years)	Brother of Rimush and son of Sargon	Faced little to no rebellions and could as such embark on campaigns to lands distant from Akkad; Primarily campaigned to the south, winning victories along the Tigris and in the Persian Gulf
4th		Naram-Sin 𒀭𒈾𒊏𒄠𒀭𒂗𒍪; Na-ra-am Sîn	r. c. 2255 – c. 2218 BC (MC) r. c. 2191 – c. 2154 BC (SC) (36 or 56 years)	Son of Manishtushu	Under Naram-Suen, the Akkadian empire reached its maximum power and faced rebellions from: Uruk, Ur, Lagash, Umma, Adab, Shuruppak, Isin, Nippur, Kish, Kutha, Sippar, Kazallu, Eresh, Dilbat, and Borsippa; The first Mesopotamian ruler to self-deify, calling himself the, "God of Akkad" and imposing an imperial cult; Introduced the title, "King of the Four Corners of the World"
5th		Shar-Kali-Sharri 𒊬𒂵𒉌 𒈗𒌷; Šar-ka-li-šar-ri	r. c. 2218 – c. 2193 BC (MC) r. c. 2154 – c. 2129 BC (SC) (24 or 25 years)	Son of Naram-Sin	During Sharkalisharri's reign, the Akkadian empire collapsed as a result of the Guti invasion and widespread drought; Possibly the last Akkadian king to actually control more than the city of Akkad itself
"157 are the years of the dynasty of Sargon. Then who was king? Who was the king?" — SKL
Akkadian interregnum (c. 2193 – c. 2189 BC)
#	Depiction	King	Approx. date of reign	Succession	Notes
6th		Igigi 𒄿𒄀𒄀; I-gi-gi	r. c. 2193 – c. 2192 BC (MC) r. c. 2129 – c. 2128 BC (SC) (≤1 year)	Unclear succession	Uncertain succession, anarchy following the Guti invasion; Seized power in the anarchy following the death of Sharkalisharri, ruling for about a year; Said on the SKL to have held the title of, "King" of not just Akkad; but, to have held the "Kingship" over all of Sumer
7th		Imi 𒄿𒈪; I-mi	r. c. 2192 – c. 2191 BC (MC) r. c. 2128 – c. 2127 BC (SC) (≤1 year)	Unclear succession	Historicity uncertain; Known from the SKL; very little otherwise; Said on the SKL to have held the title of, "King" of not just Akkad; but, to have held the "Kingship" over all of Sumer
8th		Nanum 𒈾𒉡𒌝; Na-nu-um	r. c. 2191 – c. 2190 BC (MC) r. c. 2127 – c. 2126 BC (SC) (≤1 year)	Unclear succession	Historicity uncertain; Known from the SKL; very little otherwise; Said on the SKL to have held the title of, "King" of not just Akkad; but, to have held the "Kingship" over all of Sumer
9th		Ilulu 𒅋𒇽; Ilu-lu	r. c. 2190 – c. 2189 BC (MC) r. c. 2126 – c. 2125 BC (SC) (≤1 year)	Unclear succession	Same person as Elulmesh of the Gutians (?); The final of the four short-lived rivals vying for the throne in the aftermath of Sharkalisharri's death; Said on the SKL to have held the title of, "King" of not just Akkad; but, to have held the "Kingship" over all of Sumer
"4 of them ruled for only 3 years" — SKL
The final kings to rule Akkad, Dudu and Shu-turul are assumed to have been related to the original ruling dynasty and as such are often regarded as members of the Sargonic dynasty.
Final kings of Akkad (c. 2189 – c. 2154 BC)
#	Depiction	King	Approx. date of reign	Succession	Notes
10th		Dudu 𒁺𒁺; Du-du	r. c. 2189 – c. 2168 BC (MC) r. c. 2125 – c. 2104 BC (SC) (21 years)	Possibly a son of Sharkalisharri	Campaigned against former Akkadian subjects in the south, such as Girsu, Umma, and Elam
11th		Shu-turul 𒋗𒉣𒇬𒍌; Šu-ṭur-ul	r. c. 2168 – c. 2154 BC (MC) r. c. 2104 – c. 2083 BC (SC) (15 or 18 years)	Son of Dudu	The last king of Akkad, ruled over a greatly reduced territory that included Akkad itself, Kish, Tutub, and Eshnunna
"11 kings; they ruled for 181 years. Then Akkad was defeated and the kingship was taken to Uruk." — SKL

== King of Sumer and Akkad ==
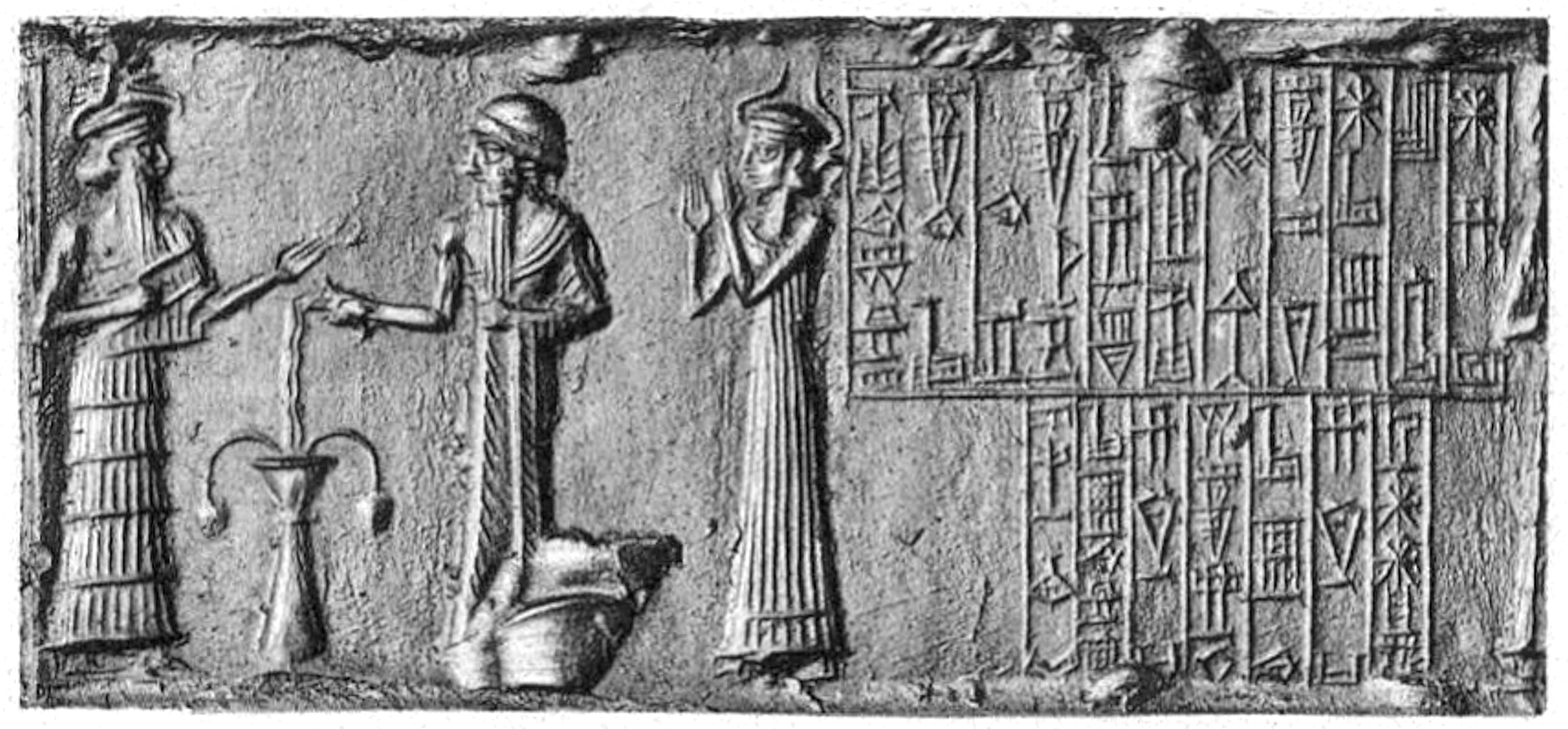
Cylindrical seal of Shulgi of Ur (r. c. 2094–2047 BC). The inscription titles him as "Shulgi, strong hero, King of Ur, King of Sumer and Akkad".

Although Akkad and what remained of its empire was destroyed, its power and prominence led to rulers of later Mesopotamian empires wishing to claim its prestige and legacy for themselves. Ur-Nammu, who founded the Neo-Sumerian Empire in the aftermath of the Gutian rule of Mesopotamia assumed the title "King of Sumer and Akkad". Although the title was meant to justify his rule over both southern (Sumer) and northern (Akkad) Mesopotamia, it also clearly connected Ur-Nammu to the old Akkadian kings, who may have been against linking Sumer and Akkad in such a fashion even though they had ruled both regions.

Ur-Nammu's title would endure for more than 1,500 years. It was assumed by Hammurabi, founder of the Old Babylonian Empire, and used by Babylonian kings up until the 8th century BC. It was also prominently used in the Middle and Neo-Assyrian Empires and in the Neo-Babylonian Empire. For Assyrian kings, "King of Sumer and Akkad" was used as a marker of their control of Babylon (which was in the South, e.g. Sumer) and only those Assyrian kings who actually controlled Babylon used the title in their inscriptions.

The final king to assume the title of "King of Sumer and Akkad" was Cyrus the Great of the Achaemenid Empire, who reigned from 559 to 530 BC. In the Cyrus Cylinder, written in Akkadian cuneiform script following Cyrus's conquest of Babylon, he assumed several traditional Mesopotamian royal titles, most of which were not used by his successors.
