= Ur-nigin =

Mesopotamian governor

Ur-nigin 𒌨𒆸
- Governor of Uruk
- Reign: c. 2200 BCE
- Successor: Ur-gigir
- Dynasty: Fourth Dynasty of Uruk

Location of Uruk

Ur-nigin, also Ur-nigina (𒌨𒆸, ur-niŋin) or Ur-nigar (𒌨𒉌𒃻, ur-ni-gar) was a Governor (ensi) of Uruk who lived in the 22nd century BC.

According to the Sumerian King List, Ur-Nigin destroyed the Akkadian Empire, which had probably already been weakened by the Gutians, and established a short-lived Fourth Dynasty of Uruk.

The Sumerian King List, describing the confusion of the decline of the Akkadian Empire after the death of Shar-kali-shari, mentions the rule of several kings, among them Ur-Nigin:

"Who was king? Who was not king? Irgigi the king; Nanum, the king; Imi the king; Ilulu, the king—the four of them were kings but reigned only three years. Dudu reigned 21 years; Shu-Turul, the son of Dudu, reigned 15 years. ... Agade was defeated and its kingship carried off to Uruk. In Uruk, Ur-ningin reigned 7 years, Ur-gigir, son of Ur-ningin, reigned 6 years; Kuda reigned 6 years; Puzur-ili reigned 5 years, Ur-Utu reigned 6 years. Uruk was smitten with weapons and its kingship carried off by the Gutian hordes."

— Sumerian King List.

Ur-Nigin is also mentioned in several votive inscriptions by his son Ur-gigir. One of them reads:

Ur-gigir, governor-general of the god Dumuzi, son of Ur-nigar, the mighty man, king of Uruk, and Ama-lagar his mother, for the goddess Ninšešegara his lady, the Ešešegara temple, her beloved temple in Patibira he built for her.

— Inscription of Ur-gigir.

The Fourth Dynasty of Uruk was finally destroyed by the Gutian Dynasty.

== See also ==
- History of Mesopotamia
- List of Mesopotamian dynasties

Regnal titles
Preceded by Akkadian Empire	King of Uruk ca. 22nd century BCE	Succeeded by Ur-gigir
