= Dagni =

Dagni Дагни Дагьни
- Selo
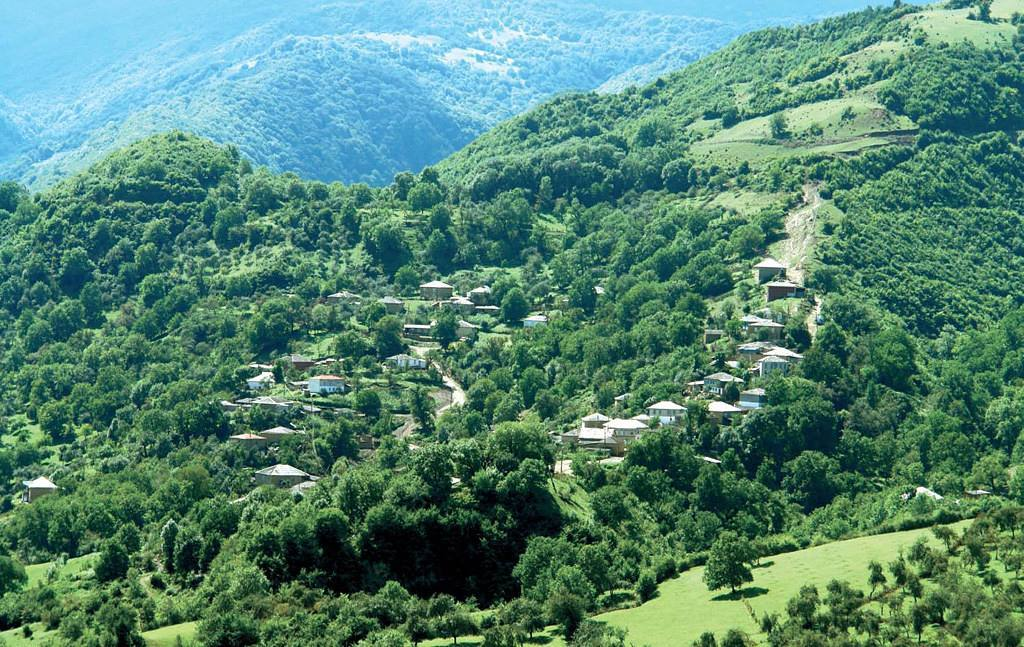
- Photograph of Dagni

- Location within Republic of Dagestan Location within Russia
- Coordinates: 41°55′N 47°54′E
- Country: Russia
- Region: Republic of Dagestan
- District: Tabasaransky District
- Time zone: UTC+3:00

Dagni (Russian: Дагни; Tabassaran: Дагьни) is a rural locality (a selo) in Guriksky Selsoviet, Tabasaransky District, Republic of Dagestan, Russia. Population: 315 (2010 census); 374 (2002 census); 257 (1989 Soviet census). There are 3 streets.

== Geography ==
Dagni is located 10 km southwest of Khuchni (the district's administrative centre) by road. Gyugryag is the nearest rural locality.
