= Ilulu =

King of the Akkadian Empire

Ilulu 𒅋𒇽
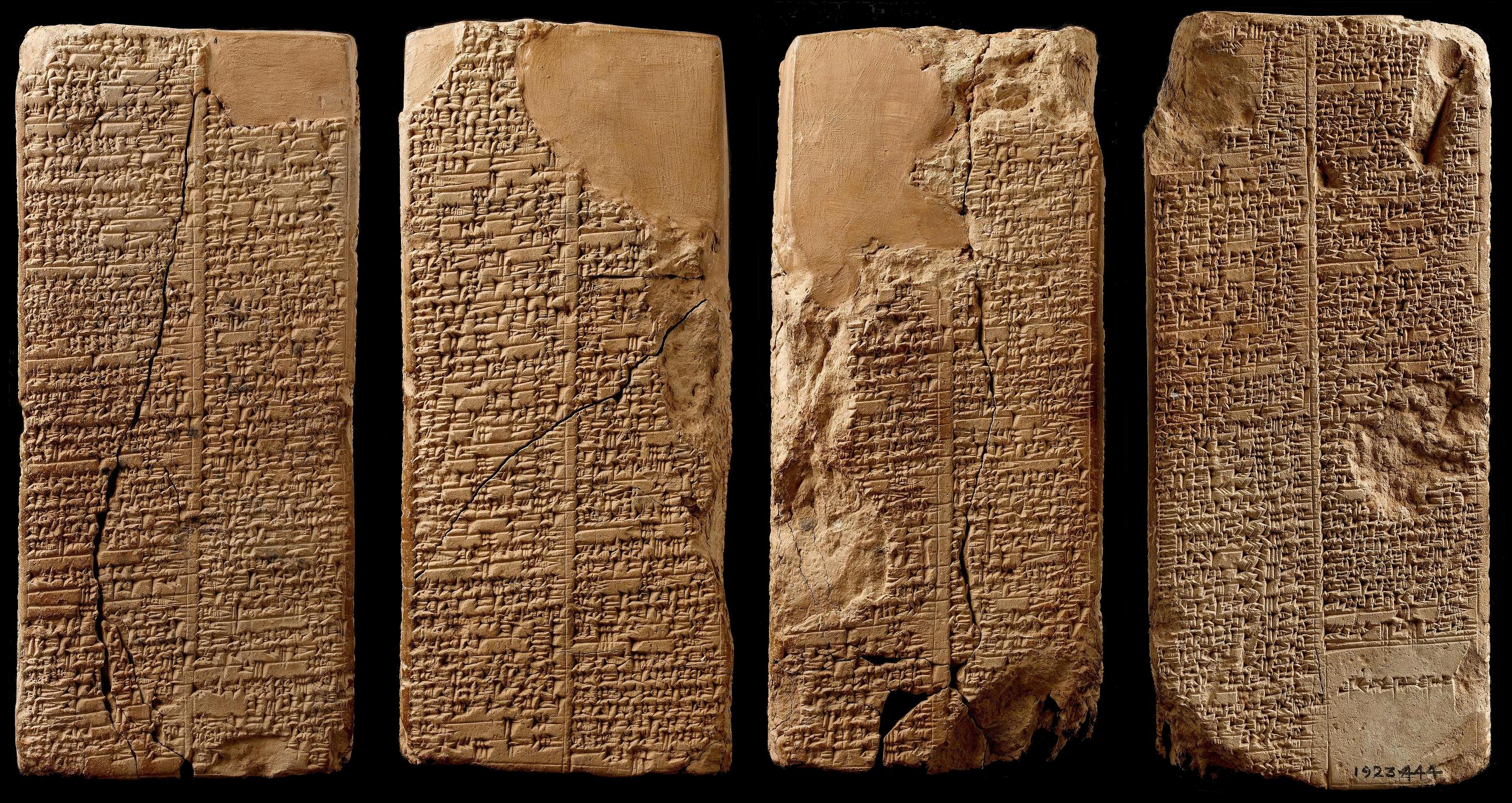

King of Akkad
- Reign: c. 2190 – c. 2189 BC
- Predecessor: Possibly Nanum
- Successor: Possibly Dudu
- Died: c. 2189 BC

Ilulu or Elulu (died c. 2189 BC), according to the Sumerian King List, was one of four rivals (the others being Igigi, Imi, and Nanum) vying to be king of Akkad during a three-year period following the death of Shar-Kali-Sharri. This chaotic period came to an end when Dudu consolidated his power over the realm.

While there is virtually no surviving evidence dating from this short timespan, thought to correspond with the first Gutian inroads into Akkadian territory, it has been suggested that this Ilulu is to be identified as the same as the Gutian king Elulmesh, also known from the kinglist.

== See also ==
- History of Mesopotamia
- List of Mesopotamian dynasties
