= Ur-gigir =

Sumerian king, 22nd-century BC

Ur-gigir 𒌨𒄑𒇀
- Governor of Uruk
- Reign: c. 2200 BCE
- Predecessor: Ur-nigin
- Successor: Kuda
- Dynasty: Fourth Dynasty of Uruk

Location of Uruk

Ur-gigir (𒌨𒄑𒇀, ur-{gesh}gigir) was the son of Ur-nigin and a Governor (ensi) of Uruk who lived in the 22nd century BC.

According to the Sumerian King List, Ur-gigir's father Ur-nigin destroyed the Akkadian Empire, which had probably already been weakened by the Gutians, and established a short-lived Fifth Dynasty of Uruk.

The Sumerian King List, describing the confusion of the decline of the Akkadian Empire after the death of Shar-kali-shari, mentions the rule of several kings, among them Ur-gigir:

"Who was king? Who was not king? Irgigi the king; Nanum, the king; Imi the king; Ilulu, the king—the four of them were kings but reigned only three years. Dudu reigned 21 years; Shu-Turul, the son of Dudu, reigned 15 years. ... Agade was defeated and its kingship carried off to Uruk. In Uruk, Ur-ningin reigned 7 years, Ur-gigir, son of Ur-ningin, reigned 6 years; Kuda reigned 6 years; Puzur-ili reigned 5 years, Ur-Utu reigned 6 years. Uruk was smitten with weapons and its kingship carried off by the Gutian hordes."

— Sumerian King List.

Ur-gigir appears in several of his own votive inscriptions, where he mentions his father Ur-nigin. One of them reads:

Ur-gigir, governor-general of the god Dumuzi, son of Ur-nigar, the mighty man, king of Uruk, and Ama-lagar his mother, for the goddess Ninšešegara his lady, the Ešešegara temple, her beloved temple in Patibira he built for her.

— Inscription of Ur-gigir.

The Fourth Dynasty of Uruk was finally destroyed by the Gutian Dynasty.

== See also ==
- History of Sumer
- Sumerian king list
- List of Mesopotamian dynasties

Regnal titles
Preceded by Ur-nigin	King of Uruk ca. 22nd century BCE	Succeeded by Kuda
