= Shar-Kali-Sharri =

Akkadian ruler (2217–2193 BC)

Shar-Kali-Sharri 𒀭𒊬𒂵𒉌 𒈗𒌷
- King of Sumer
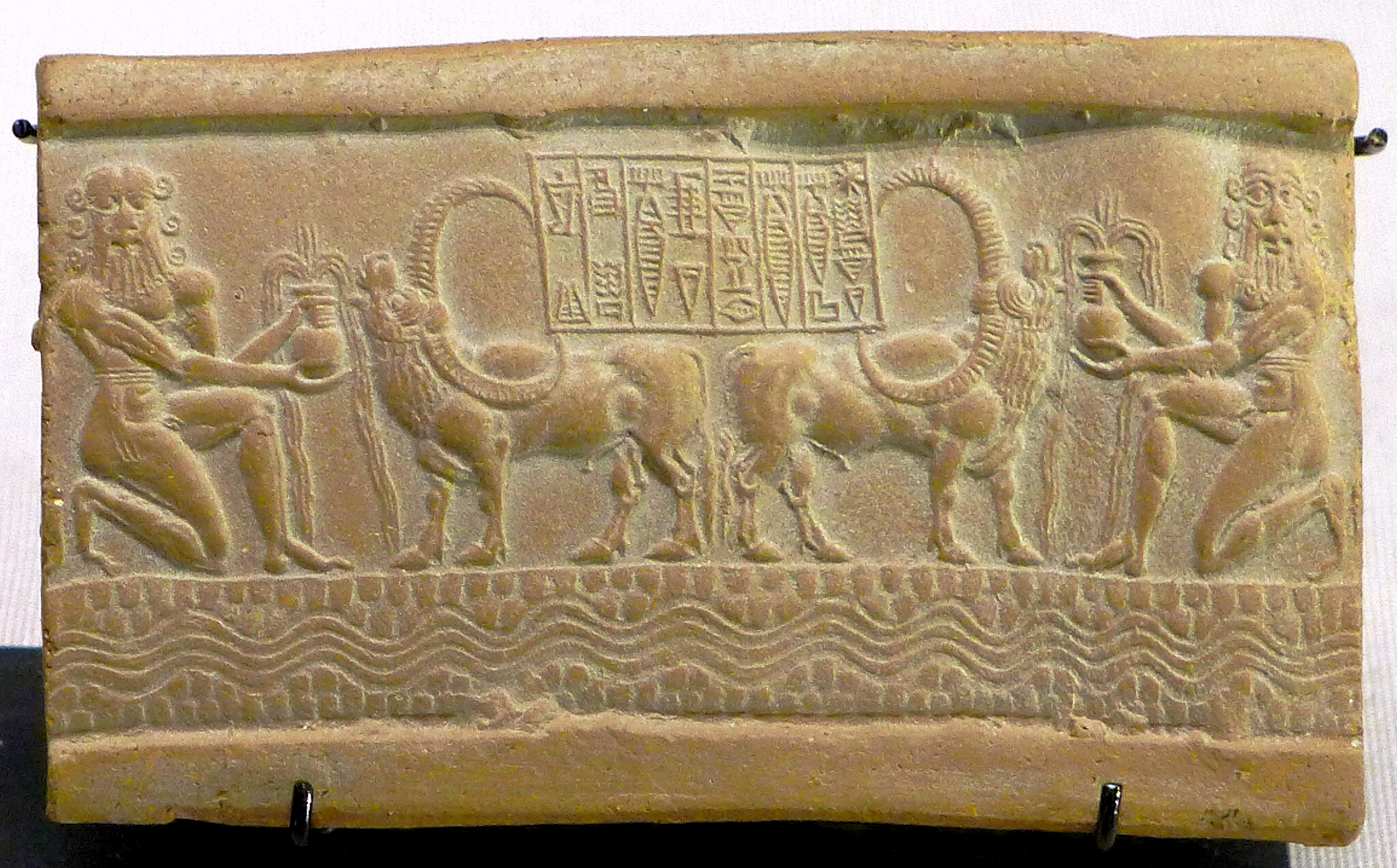
- Impression of a cylinder seal of the time of Akkadian King Sharkalisharri, with central inscription: 𒀭𒊬𒂵𒉌 𒈗𒌷 𒈗 𒀀𒂵𒉈𒆠 𒅁𒉌𒈗 𒁾𒊬 𒀵𒋢^{D}šar-ka3-li2-šar₃-ri lugal a-ga-de^{ki} ib-ni-šarrum dub-sar arad_{2}-zu "Divine Sharkalisharri, the mighty king of Agade, Ibni-Sharrum, the Scribe his servant". Circa 2217-2193 BC. Louvre Museum.

King of Akkad
- Reign: c. 2218 – c. 2193 BC
- Predecessor: Naram-Sin
- Successor: Possibly Igigi
- Died: c. 2193 BC
- Spouse: Tuta-sar-libbis
- Dynasty: Dynasty of Akkad
- Father: Naram-Sin

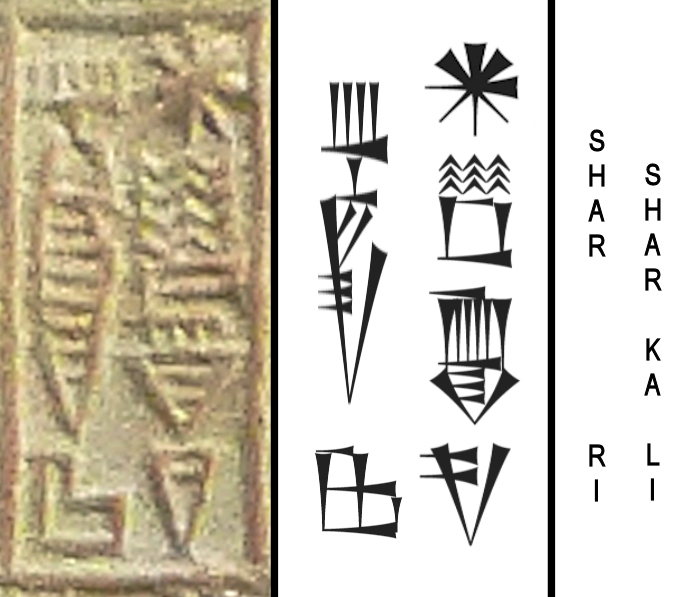
Akkadian language cuneiform for Sharkalisharri. The star symbol "𒀭", the "Dingir", is a silent honorific for "Divine".

Shar-Kali-Sharri (𒀭𒊬𒂵𒉌 𒈗𒌷, ^{D}Shar-ka-li-Sharri; died c. 2193 BC) reigned c. 2218–2193 BC (middle chronology) as the ruler of Akkad. In the early days of cuneiform scholarship the name was transcribed as "Shar-Gani-sharri". In the 1870s, Assyriologists thought Shar-Kali-Sharri was identical with the Sargon of Akkad, first ruler of Akkad, but this identification was recognized as mistaken in the 1910s. His name was sometimes written with the leading Dingir sign demarking deification and sometimes without it. Clearly at some point he was deified and two of his designations marked his divine status, "heroic god of Akkade", and "god of the land of Warium". He was the son and successor of Naram-Sin who deified himself during his lifetime.

== Biography ==
Map of the Akkadian Empire under Shar-Kali-Sharri

Shar-Kali-Sharri succeeded his father Naram-Sin around 2218 BC. According to the Sumerian King List, his reign lasted 25 years, which is closely matched by the year name from his rule. He completed the establishment of direct Akkadian rule, a process initiated by his predecessor. It is known, from the seal impressions of three of her majordomos (example - "Sar-kali-sarri, king of the subjects of the god Enlil. Tuta-sar-libbis, the queen: Iskun-Dagan, scr[ibe] and her major[d]omo, (is) [her] servant"), that the wife and queen of Shar-Kali-Shari was Tuta-sar-libbis.

Naram-Sin maintained control over the various city-states by the simple expedient of appointing some of his many sons as key provincial governors, and his daughters as high priestesses. Shar-Kali-Shari would have inherited this system on his ascension but is not known if he had any offspring or, for the most part, the nature of his provincial governors. It has been suggested that he was governor of Nippur before assuming the crown. This is supported by the fact that text show that he was crowned in Nippur, a process that included his sister Tudanapšum who had been named high priestess of Enlil at Nippur.

It was traditional for rulers in Mesopotamia to make an occasional "royal progress" visiting the major cultic sites. One such progress is known from the reign of his father Naram-Sin, fourth ruler of the Akkadian Empire. He was accompanied by three of his children, Bin-kali-šarrē, Tudanapšum, and crown prince Shar-Kali-Shari. It is known that Shar-Kali-Sharri made a royal journey to Sumer early in his reign which lasted at least six months. Cities known to have been included in the royal progress were Umma, Zabala, Isin, Girsu, and Nippur with many royal gifts dispensed and much feasting. In a show of military strength at least five sagina (generals) accompanied Shar-Kali-Shari.

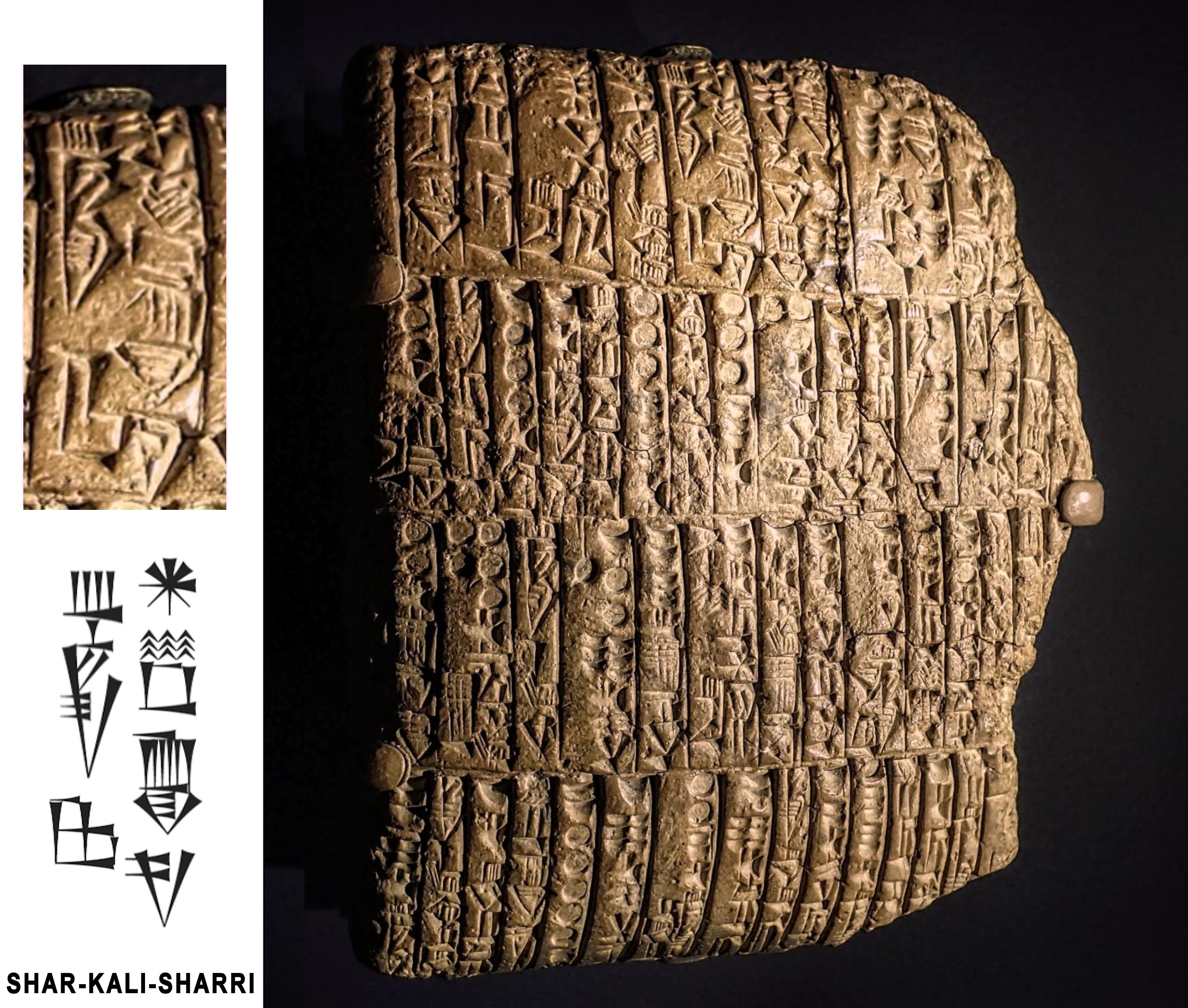
Cuneiform tablet in the name of Shar-Kali-Sharri

It is known that the governor of Adab under Shar-Kali-Shar was Lugal-gis based on three clay sealings reading "[S]ar-kali-sam, god, hero of Agade: Lugal-gis, scribe and go[vernor] of Ad[ab, (is) his] servant." (noting that the Dingir followed the rulers name here). His successor as ensi of Adab under Shar-Kali-Shali was Ur-tur, known from tablets found there. Many Adab tablets dated to his reign remain unpublished in the Istanbul Museum. The governor of another city-state, Lagash is known. Lugal-ushumgal, was a governor (ensi) under Naram-Sin and that continued under Shar-Kali-Shari. Several inscriptions of Lugal-ushumgal are known, particularly seal impressions, which refer to him as governor of Lagash and at the time a vassal (𒀵, arad, "servant" or "slave") of Naram-Sin, as well as his successor Shar-kali-sharri. One of these seals proclaims:

𒊬𒂵𒉌 𒈗𒌷 𒁕𒈝 𒈗 𒀀𒂵𒉈𒆠 𒈗𒃲𒁔 𒑐𒋼𒋛 𒉢𒁓𒆷𒆠 𒀵𒋢
Shar-kali-sharri da-num lugal a-ga-de^{ki} lugal-ušumgal ensi lagash^{ki} arad_{2}-su

"Shar-kali-sharri, the mighty king of Agade, Lugalushumgal, ensi of Lagash, is thy servant."

— Seal of Lugalushumgal as vassal of Shar-Kali-Sharri.

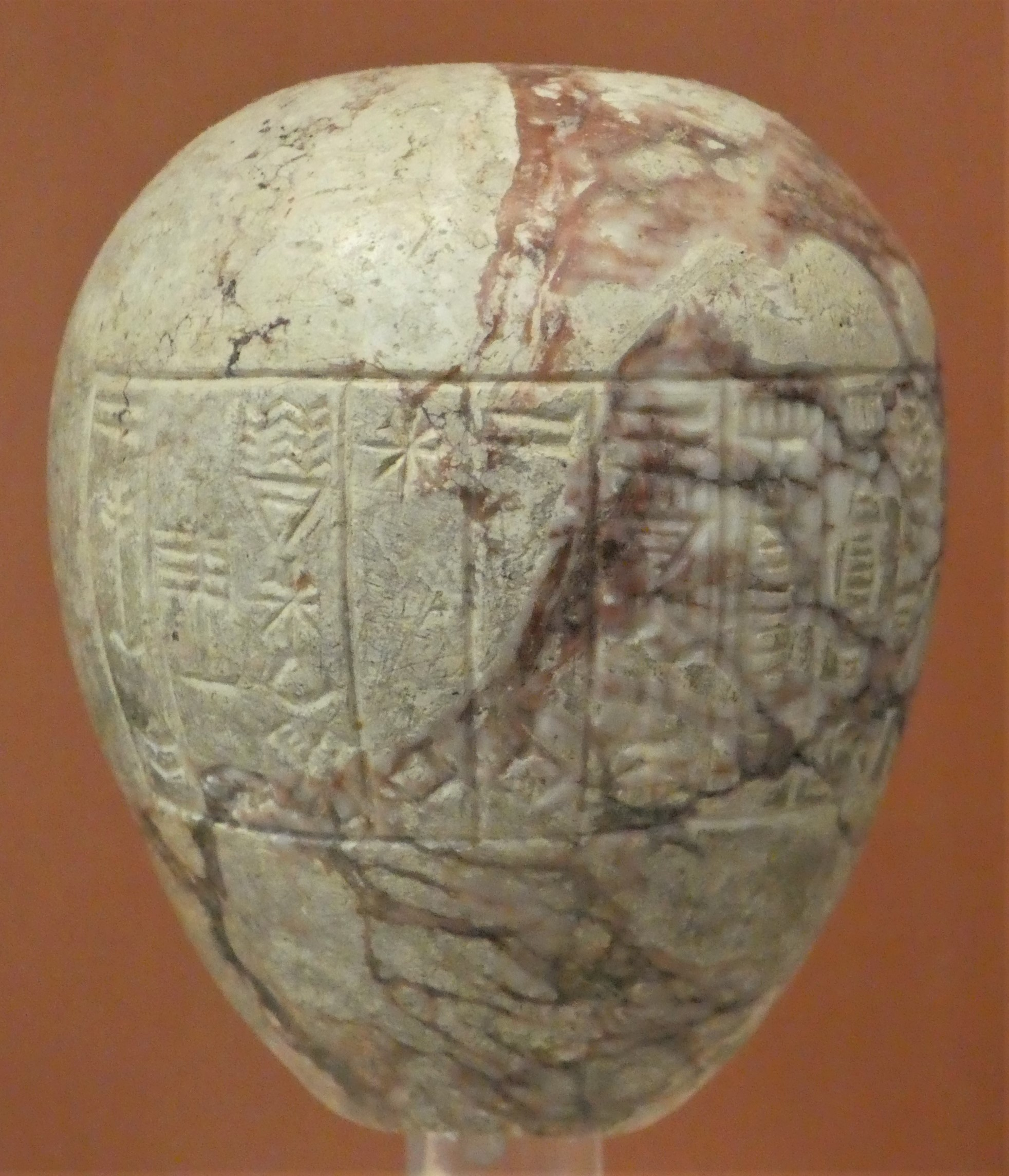
Pink marble ceremonial macehead in the name of Shar-Kali-Sharri (Akkadian: 𒊬𒂵𒉌 𒈗𒌷), found at Sippar. Inscription - "Sar-kali-sarri, king of Agade, for the god Samas at Sippar, dedicated (this mace)." (BM 91146)

Lugal-ushumgal was Governor of Lagash, a vassal of Naram-Sin and later of Shar-Kali-Sharri. His successor as governor Puzer-Mama declared himself ruler of Lagash, possibly on the death of Shar-Kali-Shari, and began the 2nd Dynasty of Lagash

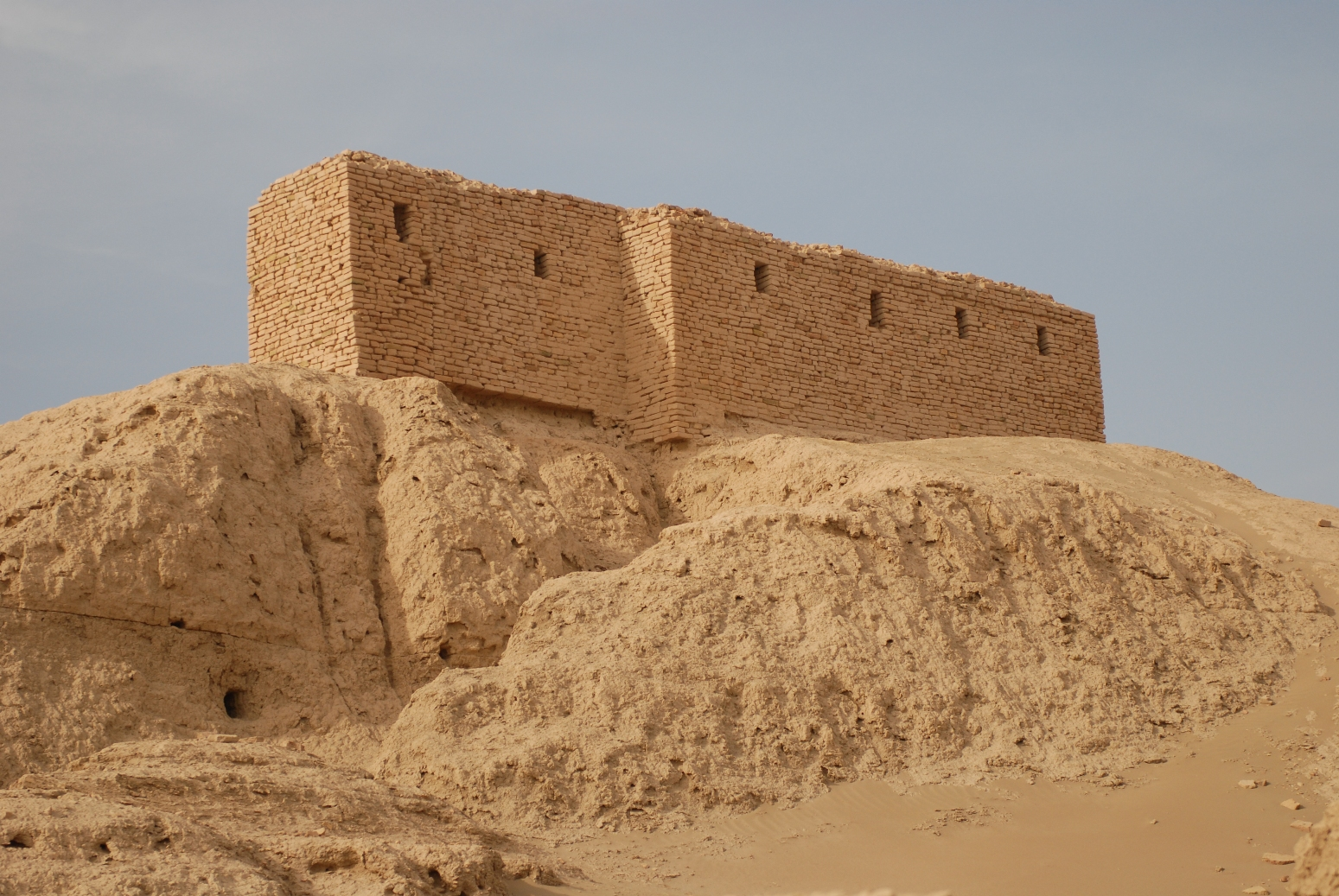
Modern photograph of the ruins of the Ekur temple at Nippur

One of the primary duties of the ruler of Mesopotamia was the maintenance of the Ekur temple of the chief god Enlil. Work on the temple, initiated by Naram-Sin, was completed by Shar-Kali-Shari. So important was this process that it was featured in seven of his year names, even naming the general appointed to lead the task, Puzur-Eshtar. Inscribed bricks of Shar-Kali-Shari were found during the excavation of Nippur:

"The god Enlil instructed (him). Sar-kali-sarri, the mighty, king of Agade, builder of Ekur, temple of the god Enlil at Nippur. As for the one who removes this inscription, may the gods Enlil, Samas, and Astar tear out his foundations and destroy his progeny."

In a tablet inscription (HS 195) he also marked, after visiting the source of the Tigris and Euphrates rivers, the giving of a cult object to Enlil at Nippur.

"The god Enlil decreed (it to him) Sar-kali-sarri, mighty king, cup bearer of the god Enlil, king of Agade, king of the subjects of the god Enlil. (The god Enlil)... as fa as ... from ... gave to him in its entirety. After he reached the sources of the Tigris and Euphrates rivers, he personally dedicated (this object) to the god Enlil in Nippur."

Shar-Kali-Shari also built new temples to Annunitum and to Ilaba (the tutelary deity of the Akkadian Empire) at Babylon, as reflected in a year name, with a further one to Ilaba at Zabala.

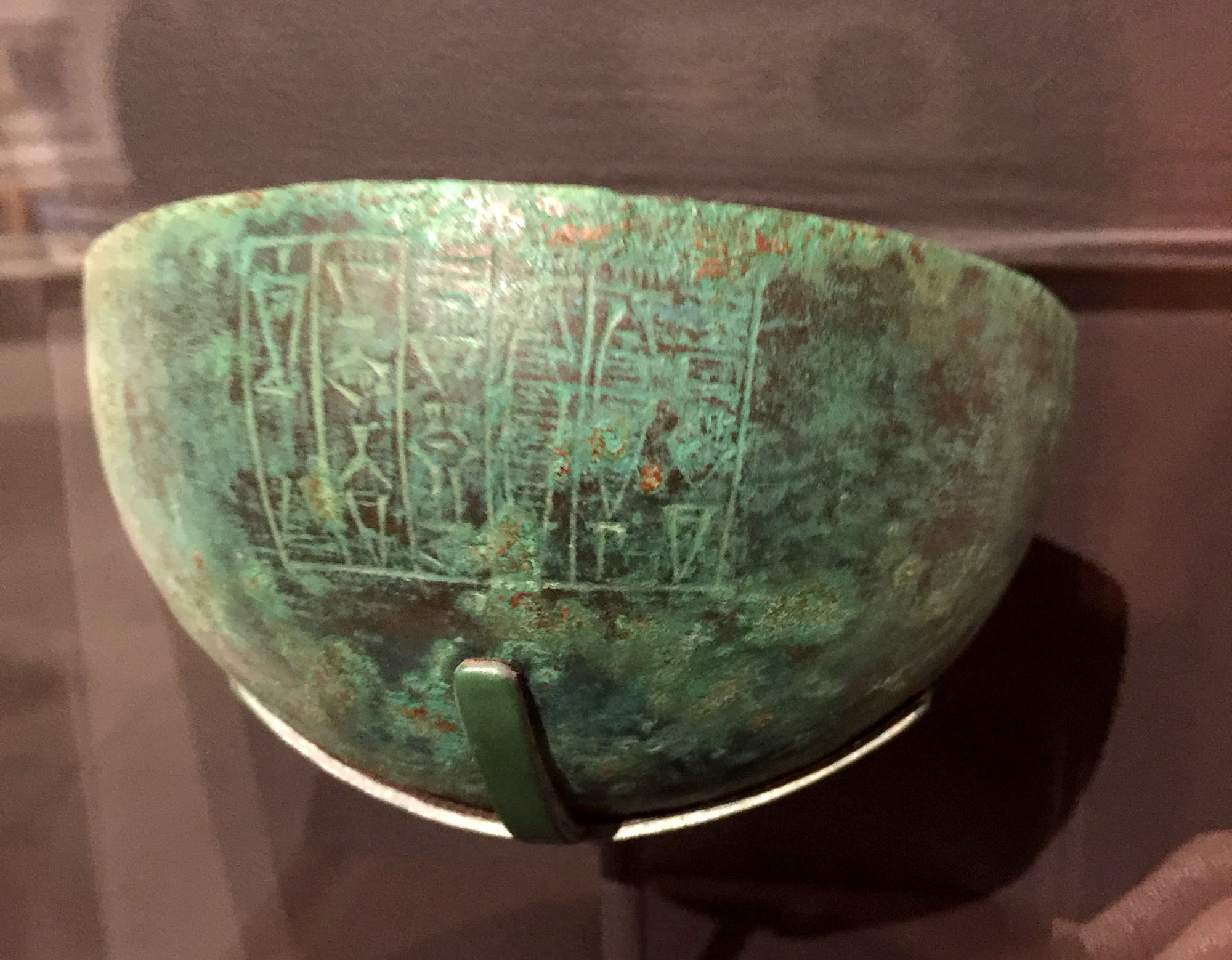
To Shar-kali-sharri, king of Agade, Shaki-beli his servant

Based on his year names the reign of Shar-Kali-Shari was fairly peaceful with the usual scuffles with nomadic groups like the MAR.TU and the Gutians as well as the traditional butting of heads with the Elamites. The economic texts from that period also would indicate a reasonable degree of prosperity. Clearly the Gutians were growing in influence during his reign as at some point they made Adab their capital, though whether as a vassals of Akkad or not is unknown. That said, there was a historical tradition that the Akkadian Empire began to unravel during his rule. One much later Neo-Babylonian copy of an inscription (BM 38302) of Shar-Kali-Shari (which also marks the building of the temple of Ilaba in Zabala) indicated that he face a widespread revolt at one point which he overcame. This reflects the Great Revolt faced by his father Naram-Sin though it cannot be discounted that passage of millennia had blurred the history of one ruler with the other.

"Sar-kali-sam, the mighty, king of Agade, builder of the ... of the temple of the goddess Astar at Zabala. [W]hen the four quarters together revolted against him ... [fr]om beyond the Lower Sea as far as the Upper [S]ea, he smote the people and all the Mountain Lands for the god Enlil and brought their kings i[n] fette[rs] before the god Enlil. Sar-kali-sam, the mighty, by the ... authority of the god Enlil, sh[owed] mercy to no one in those battles. He reached ... the source of the Tigris River and ... the source of the Euphrates River and cut down cedar wood in the Amanus (Mountains) in order to ... the temple of the goddess Astar. As for the one who removes this inscription, may the gods Enlil, Samas, and Astar tear out his foundations and destroy his progeny. Colophon - According to the text of a stele of marhusa stone. That which was written (on) the stone, Nergal-sumi-ibni of the Issakku family wrote out quickly."

According to the Sumerian King List and later literary compositions, after Shar-Kali-Sharri's death in c. 2193 BC, the region fell into anarchy, with no king able to achieve dominance for long. The king list states:

"Then who was king? Who was not the king? Igigi, Imi, Nanum, Ilulu: four of them ruled for only 3 years."

Akkad then resumed some resemblance of order for a time with the 21-year reign of Dudu followed by the 15-year reign of Shu-turul.

== Year names of Shar-Kali-Sharri ==
Lists of year names can be found for many rulers from the time of the Akkadian Empire, including Shar-Kali-Sharri. They shed light on the length of his reign and the main events:

1. Year the King of Agade sat (on his throne)
2. Year in which Shar-Kali-Sharri went down to Sumer ...
3. Year after Shar-Kali-Sharri went down to Sumer (and) [the crown] upon (his) head ...
4. Year in which Shar-Kali-Sharri appointed Puzur-Eshtar the shagina (general), to build the temple of Enlil
5. Year after the year Shar-Kali-Sharri appointed Puzur-Eshtar, the shagina, to build the temple of Enlil
6. In the year in which Shar-Kali-Sharri laid the foundations of the temple of Enlil in Nippur
7. Year the foundations of the temple of Enlil (in Nippur) were laid
8. Year following the year in which the foundations of the temple of Enlil in Nippur were laid
9. Year the king Shar-Kali-Sharri brought to the temple of Enlil …
10. In the year in which Shar-Kali-Sharri a vase of libation in gold (for the temple of Enlil and) cut down cedar timber for the temple of Enlil
11. In the year in which Shar-Kali-Sharri laid the foundations of the temples of the goddess Annunitum and of the Ilaba in Babylon and captured Sharlag(ab) the king of Gutium
12. In the year in which Shar-Kali-Sharri was victorious over MAR.TU in the Djebel Biszri
13. In the year in which Shar-Kali-Sharri brought the battle against Elam and Zahara in front of Akshak and … and was victorious
14. Year in which the yoke was imposed on Gutium
15. In the year in which Shar-Kali-Sharri …
16. In the year in which Shar-Kali-Sharri … Agade
17. In the year in which Enlil … … Shar-Kali-Sharri
18. In the year in which Enlil … Shar-Kali-Sharri …
19. Year Shar-Kali-Sharri the king of Agade...
20. In the year in which Shar-Kali-Sharri ...

— Regnal year names of Shar-Kali-Sharri

== Inscriptions ==
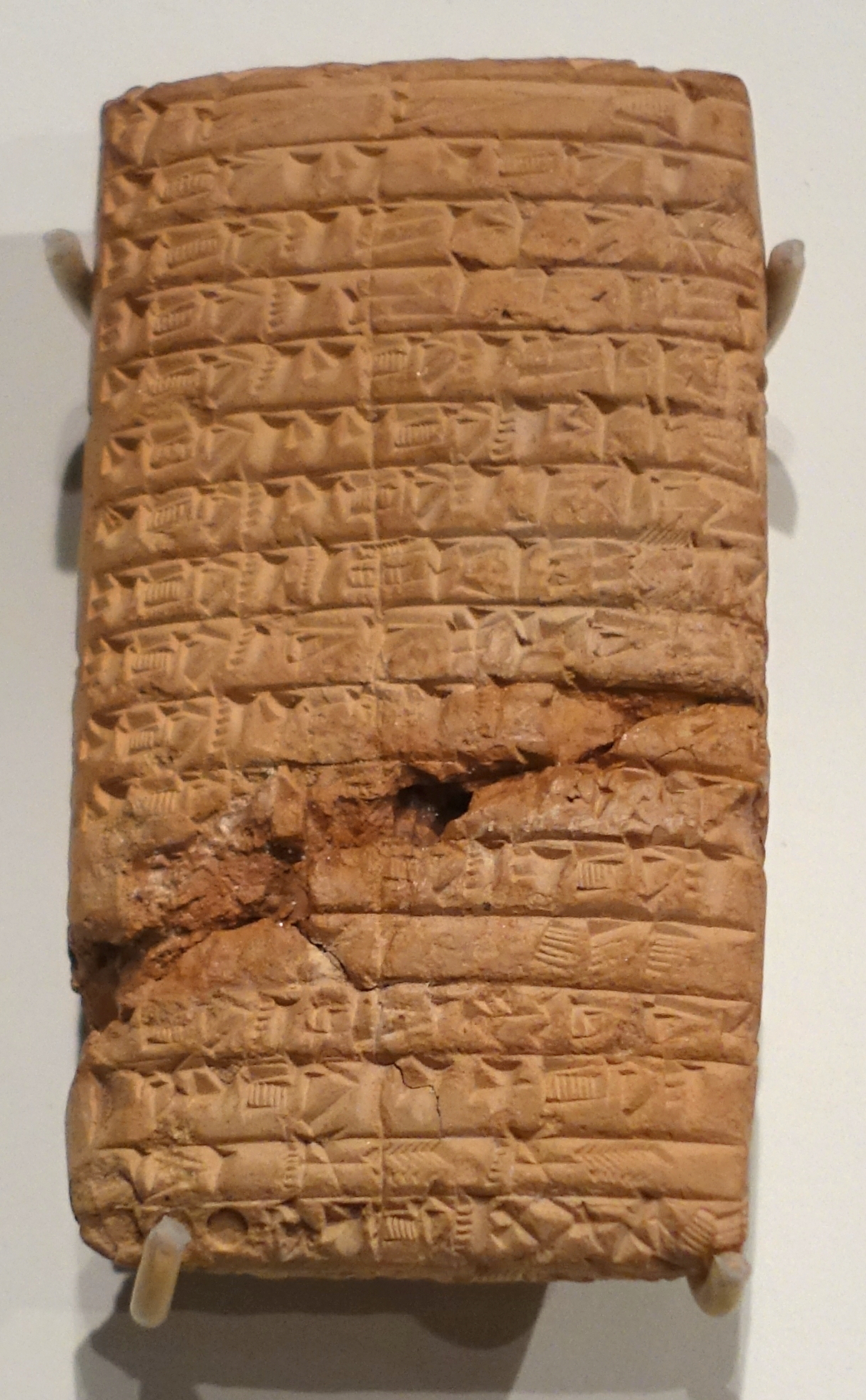
Tablet in Akkadian language recording domestic animals, Bismaya(Adab), reign of Shar-kali-sharri, c. 2100 BC, clay - Oriental Institute Museum, University of Chicago

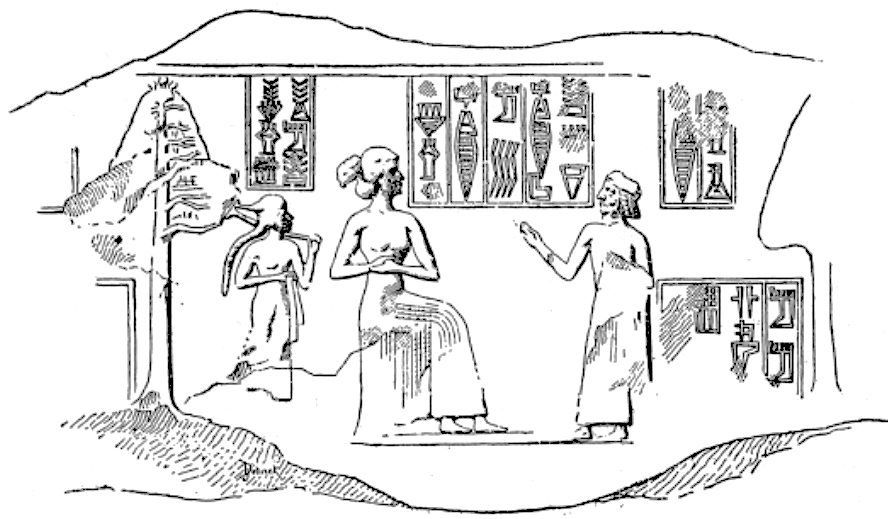
Seal of Shar-Kali-Sharri (previously attributed to Sargon), with seated deity

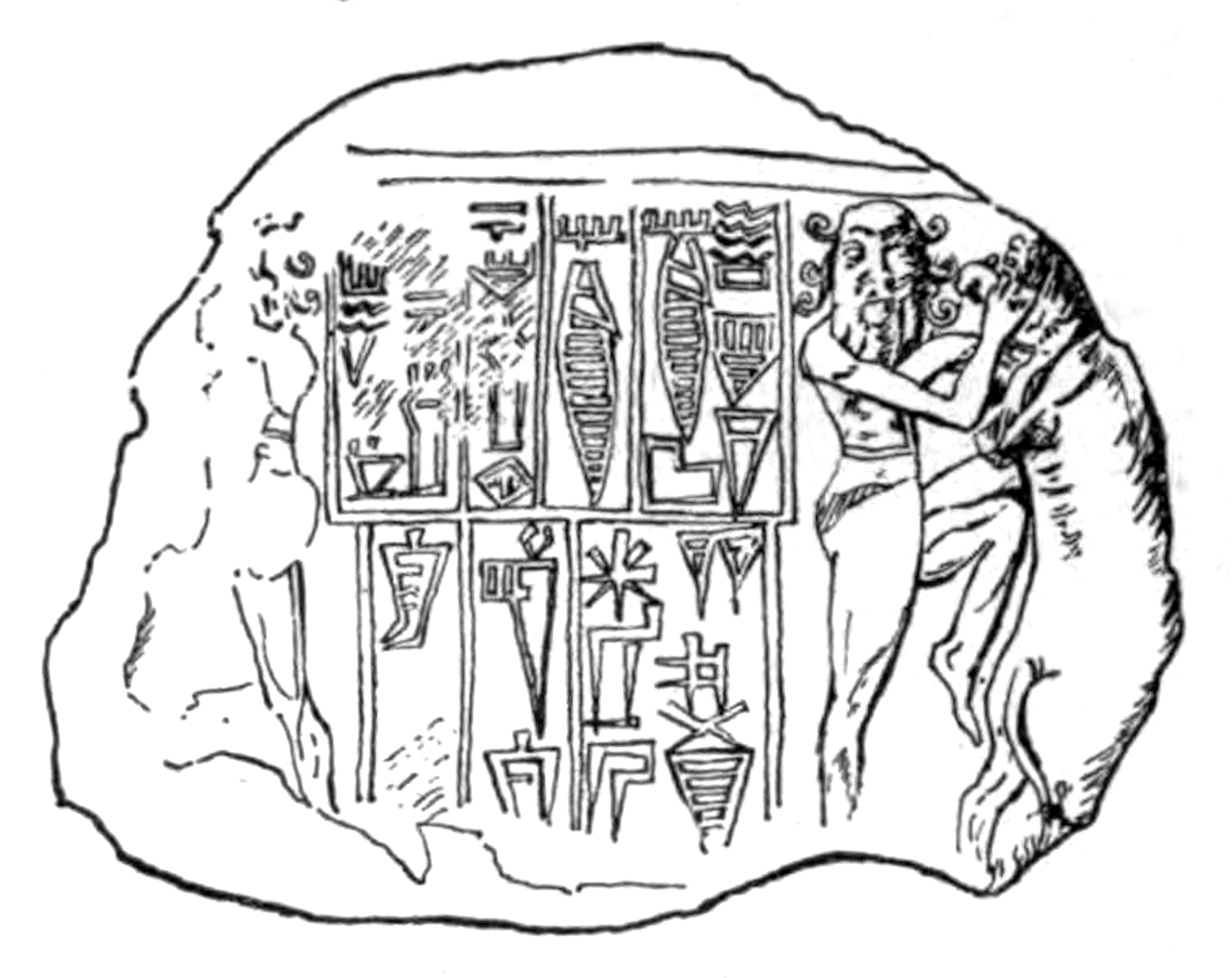
Seal of Shar-Kali-Sharri (previously attributed to Sargon), with Gilgamesh fighting a lion

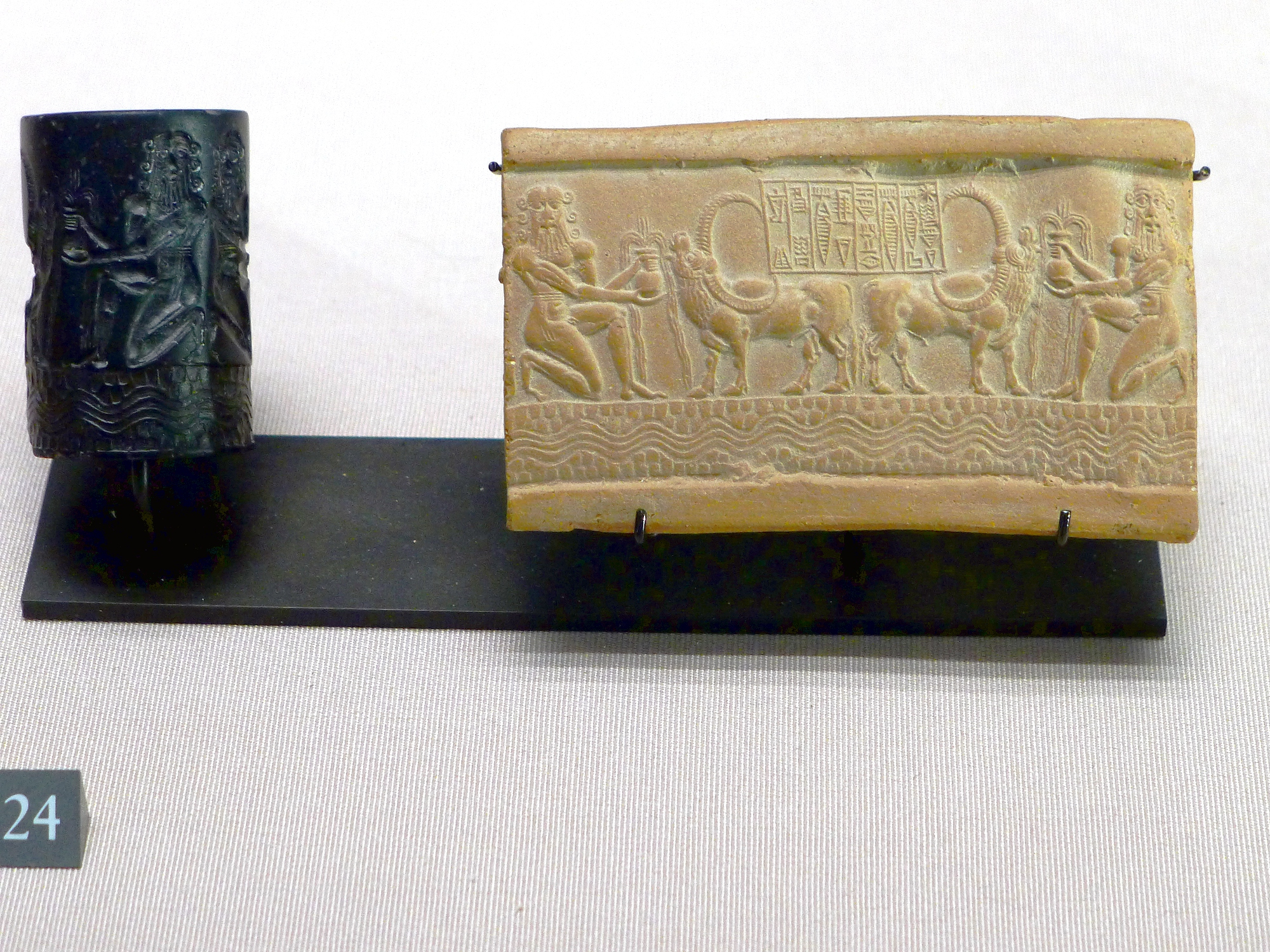
Shar-Kali-Sharri seal (Louvre)

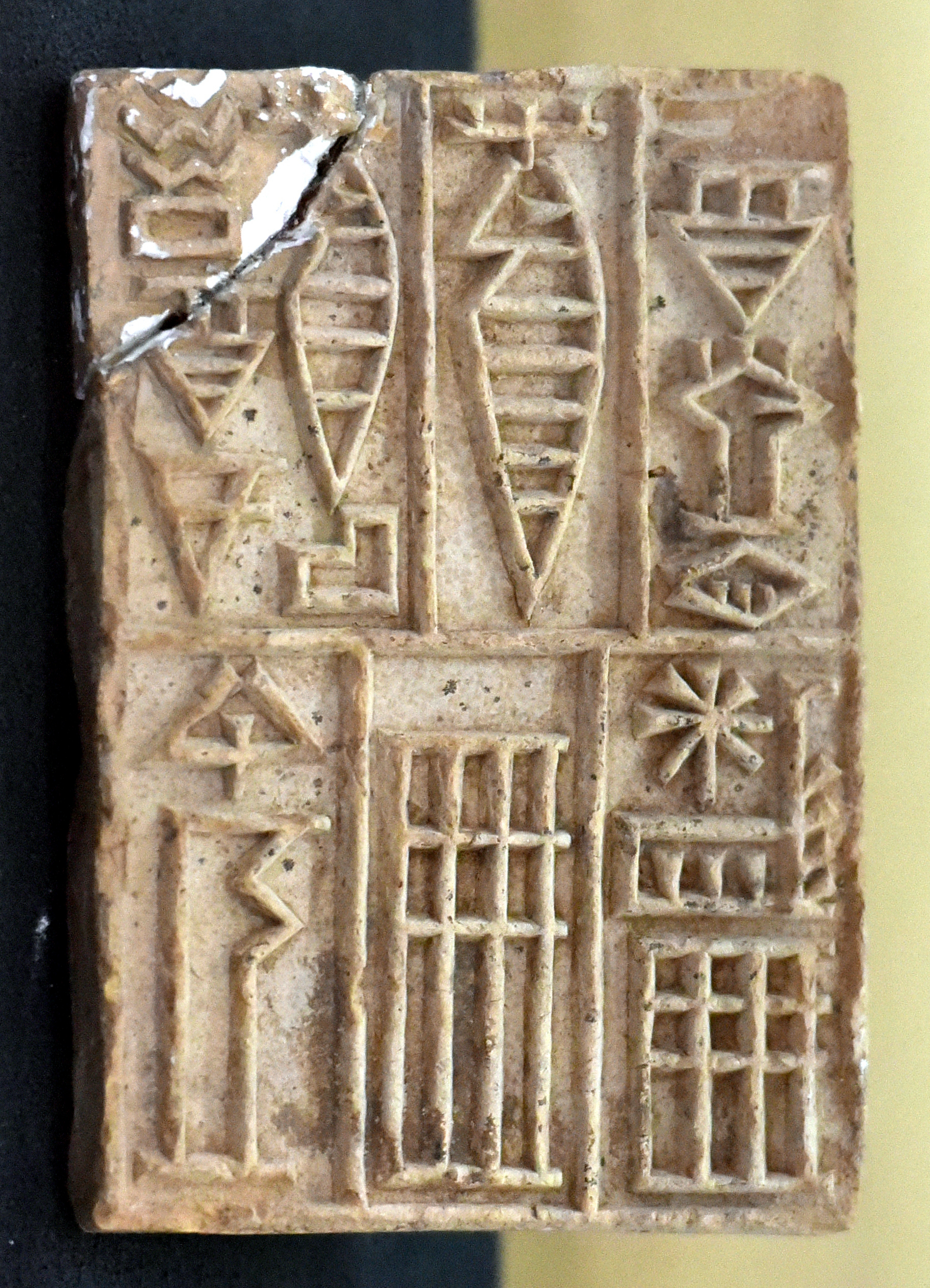
Brick Stamp of Shar-Kali-Sharri, National Museum of Iraq

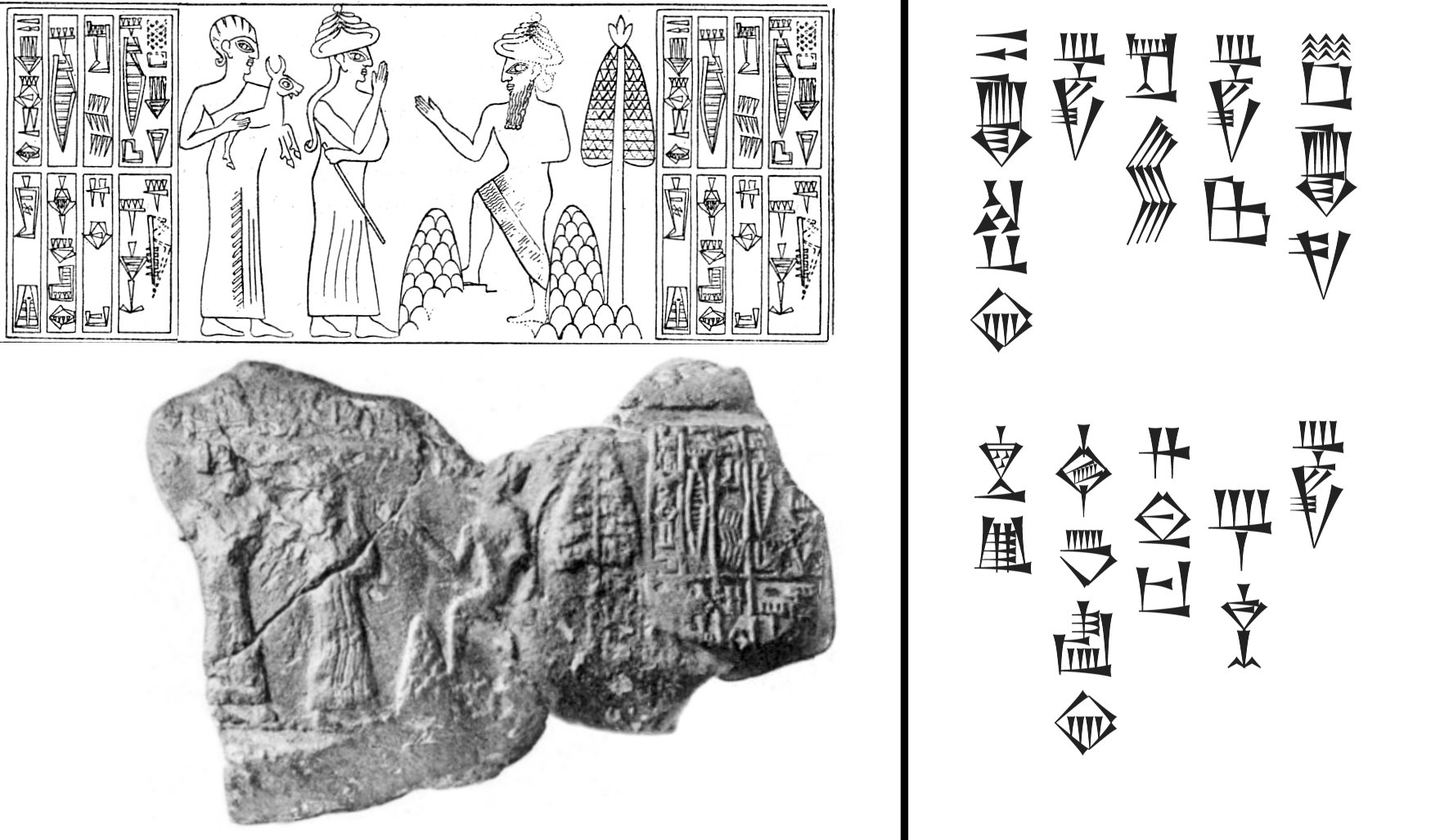
Seal impression of Lugal-ushumgal as servant of Shar-Kali-Sharri: "Sharkalisharri, the mighty king of Agade, Lugalushumgal, ensi of Lagash, is thy servant."

== See also ==
- List of Mesopotamian dynasties
- History of Sumer
- List of kings of Akkad

Regnal titles
Preceded by Naram-sin	King of Akkad; King of Kish, Uruk, Lagash, and Umma; Overlord of Elam c. 2218 – c. 2193 BC	Succeeded by Possibly Igigi
