= Tasia Scolinos =

American lawyer

Tasia Marie Scolinos (born May 8, 1972), a United States lawyer and a political appointee under the administration of George W. Bush.

== Personal ==
Scolinos is a native of Arcadia, California.

== Education ==
Scolinos graduated from Claremont McKenna College and the Georgetown Law School.

Scolinos practiced law in California from 2000 to 2001.

== Career ==
=== 2001-2002 ===
From 2001 to 2002, Scolinos worked as a spokesperson for the Treasury Department in which she supervised all issues in the Department's law enforcement portfolio. Her efforts also were focused on freezing terrorist assets and enforce the Cuba embargo.

In 2002, Scolinos served as a member of the department's transition team until she was appointed when the department was formally established.

=== 2003 ===
In 2003, she became the Deputy Assistant Secretary for Public Affairs and Senior Director of Communications for the U.S. Department of Homeland Security in which she managed the department's communications staff, press office, speechwriting unit, web development and public liaison office.

=== 2005 ===
In 2005, she became the Director of Public Affairs for the U.S. Department of Justice.
