= Dudu of Akkad =

King of the Akkadian Empire

Dudu 𒁺𒁺
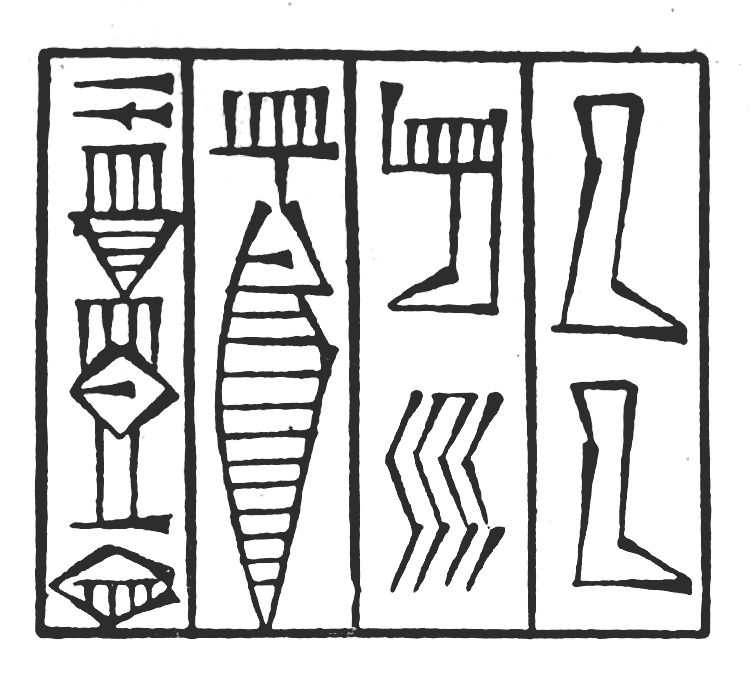
- "Dudu the Great King of Akkad" 𒁺𒁺 𒁕𒈝 𒈗 𒀀𒂵𒉈𒆠 du-du da-num lugal a-ga-de3{ki} on an alabaster vase fragment, Louvre Museum AO 6773

King of Akkad
- Reign: c. 2189 – c. 2168 BC
- Predecessor: Possibly Ilulu
- Successor: Shu-turul
- Died: c. 2168 BC
- Issue: Shu-turul

Dudu (Sumerian: 𒁺𒁺, du-du; died c. 2168 BC) was a 22nd-century BC king of Akkad, who reigned for 21 years, c. 2189–2168 BC, according to the Sumerian king list. Unlike his two predecessors Naram-Sin and Shar-Kali-Sharri, he was not deified.

== Biography ==
He became king after a period of apparent anarchy that had followed the death of Shar-Kali-Sharri. The king list mentions four other figures who had been competing for the throne during a three-year period after Sharkalisharri's death. There are no other surviving records referencing any of these competitors, but a few artifacts with inscriptions confirming Dudu's rule over a reduced Akkadian Empire. Given activity at Umma and Girsu, and at Apiak whose location is unknown but which lay near the Tigris river to the East of Nippur, the Akkadian Empire maintained some level of control to the south at least. The find of a seal at Adab, lying further East that Apiak, of a servant of Dudu supports this view. His inscriptions present him simply as "King of Akkad":

"Dudu the mighty, king of Agade: Amar-šuba the scribe (is) his servant."

— Seal inscription of Amar-šuba found at Bismaya.

He also seems to have campaigned against former Akkadian subjects to the south, including Girsu, Umma (where the governor of Lagash appointed by Shar-Kali-Sharri, Puzer-Mama, had declared independence at the end of that rule) and possibly Elam. One inscription relates directly to his destruction of Girsu:

"To {d}inanna Ištar, Dudu, king of Agade, when Girsu he smote, from the booty of Girsu he dedicated it."

— Nippur fragment of Dudu.

An alabaster vase in the Louvre Museum, since the year 2000, has the following inscription:

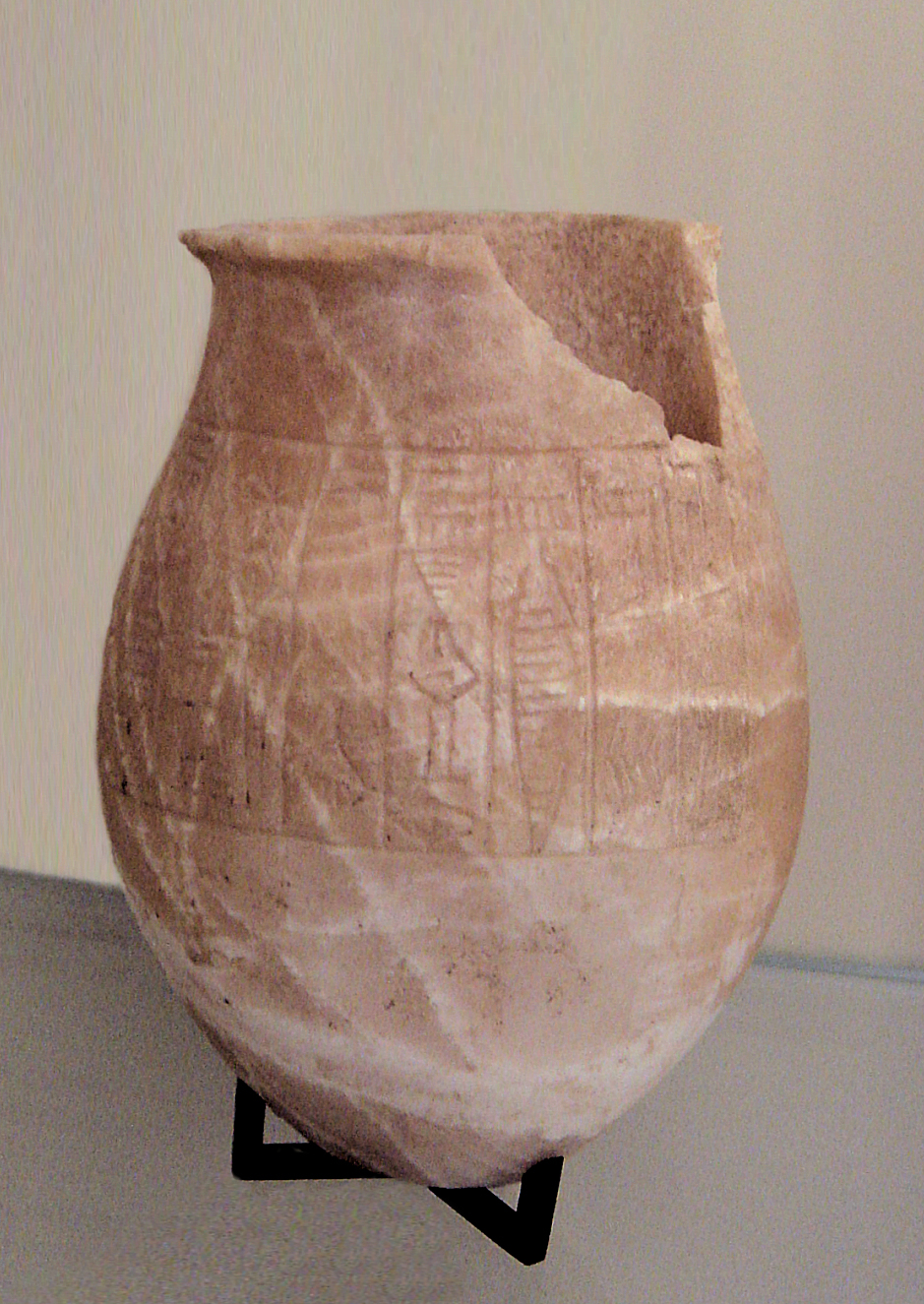
Alabaster vase of Dudu of Akkad, Louvre Museum AO 31549.

𒁺𒁺 𒁕𒈝 𒈗 𒀀𒂵𒉈𒆠 𒀀𒈾 𒀭𒊊𒀕𒃲 𒀀𒉈𒀝𒆠 𒀀𒈬𒊒 du-du da-num lugal a-ga-de3{ki} a-na {d}ne3-iri11-gal a-pi5-ak{ki} a mu-ru

"Dudu, the Great king of Akkad, for Nergal of Apiak has dedicated this"

— Vase of Dudu, King of Akkad, circa 2170 BC. Louvre Museum, AO 31549

Dudu was succeeded by his son Shu-turul per the king list, who became the last known king of Akkad. It has been suggested that a known high official in the Late Akkadian period, Išarum, was another son of Dudu. In inscriptions he calls himself "Išarum, son of Dudu" and calls on the tutelary gods of the Akkadian Empire, Istar and Ilaba.

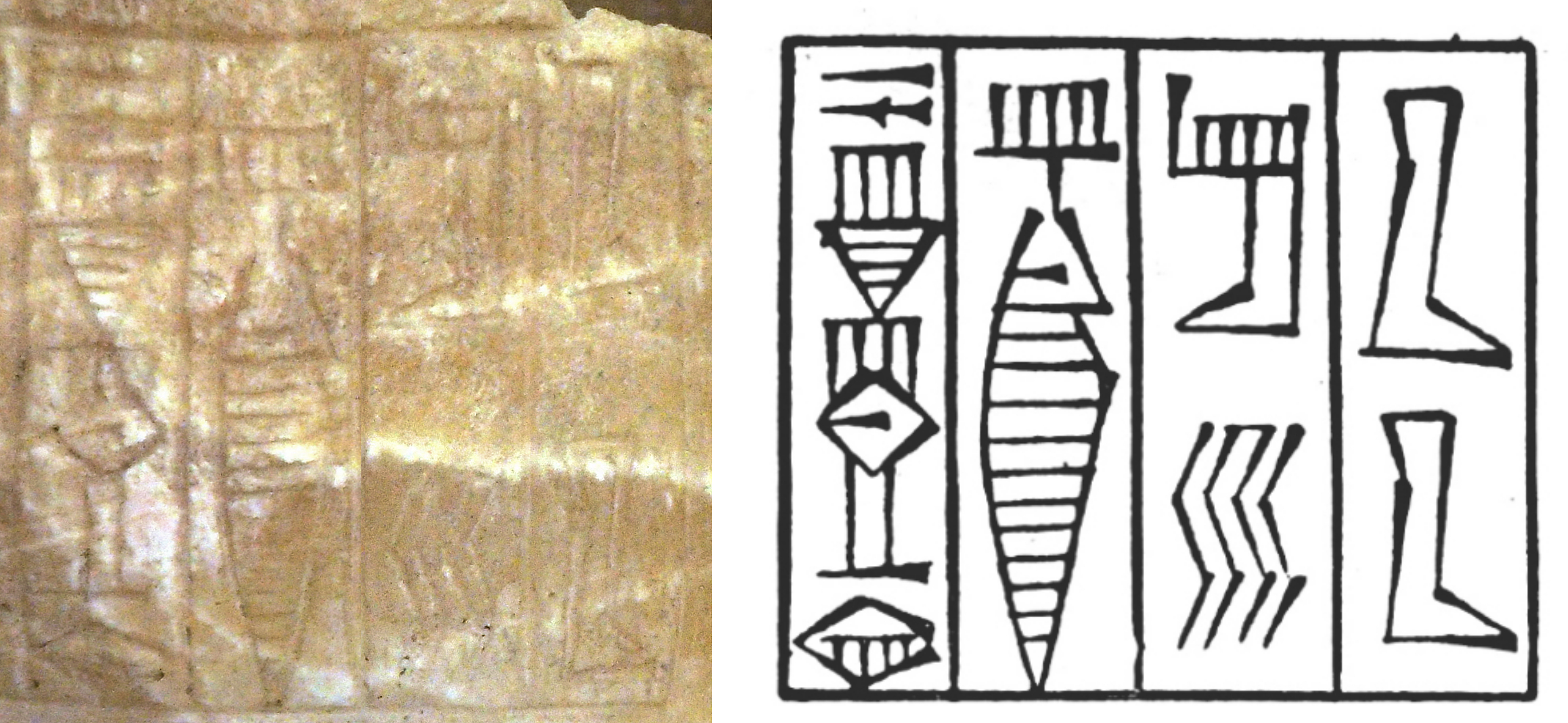
"Dudu, Great King of Akkad" (𒁺𒁺 𒁕𒈝 𒈗 𒀀𒂵𒉈𒆠, Du-du da-num lugal a-ga-de3(ki)) on the Dudu alabaster vase.

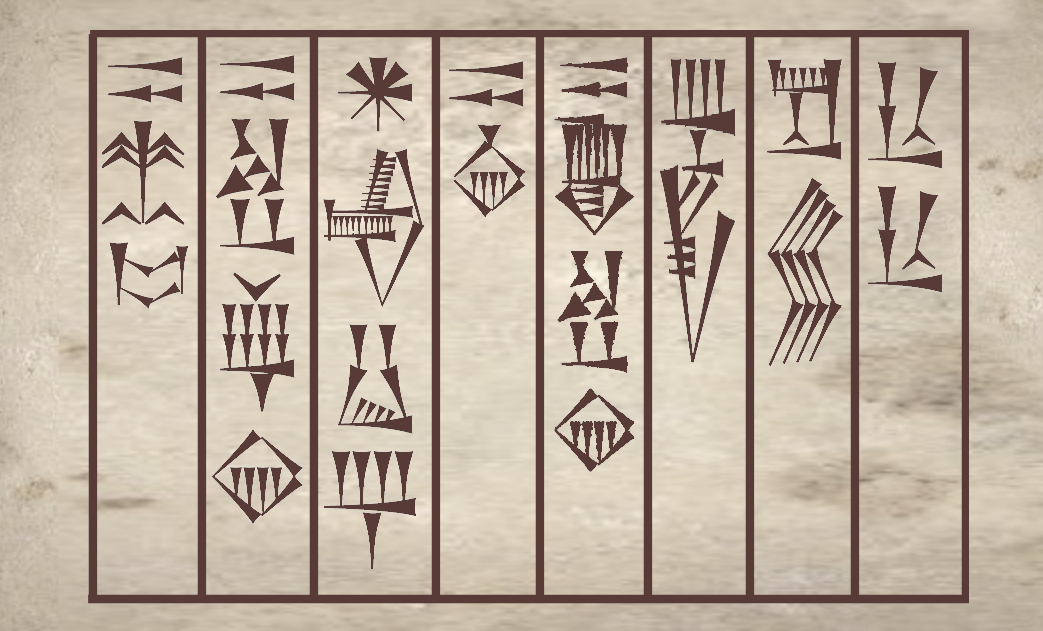
King Dudu of Agade, complete alabaster vase inscription (transcription in standard Sumero-Akkadian cuneiform): "Dudu, the Great king of Akkad, for Nergal of Apiak has dedicated this".

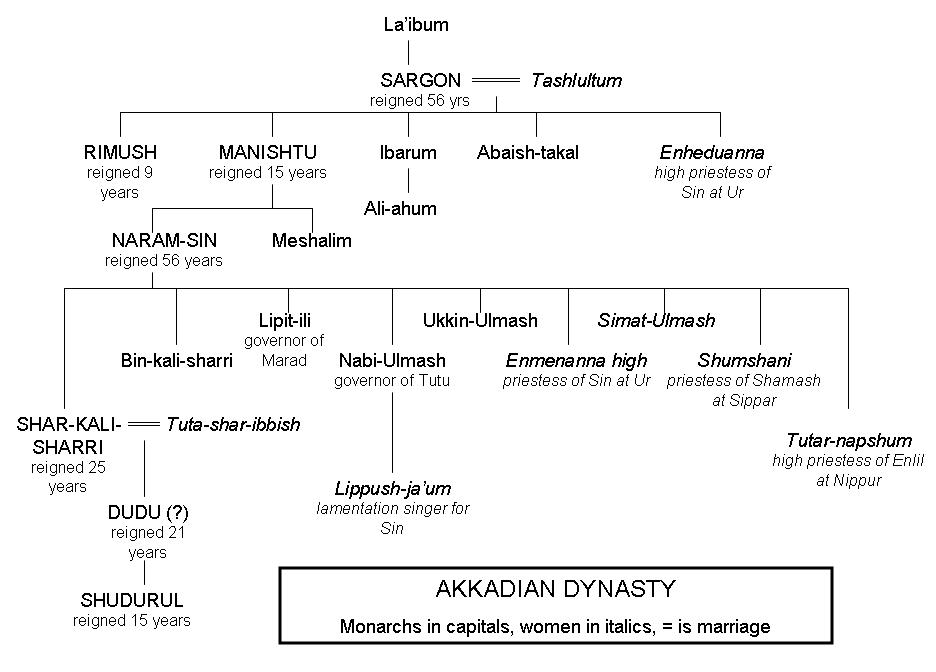
Dudu in the Akkadian family tree

== See also ==
- List of Mesopotamian dynasties
- List of kings of Akkad

== Sources ==
Regnal titles
Preceded by Possibly Ilulu	King of Akkad; King of Kish, Uruk, Lagash, and Umma; Overlord of Elam c. 2189 – c. 2168 BC	Succeeded by Shu-turul
