= Timeline of ancient Assyria =

Ancient Assyria

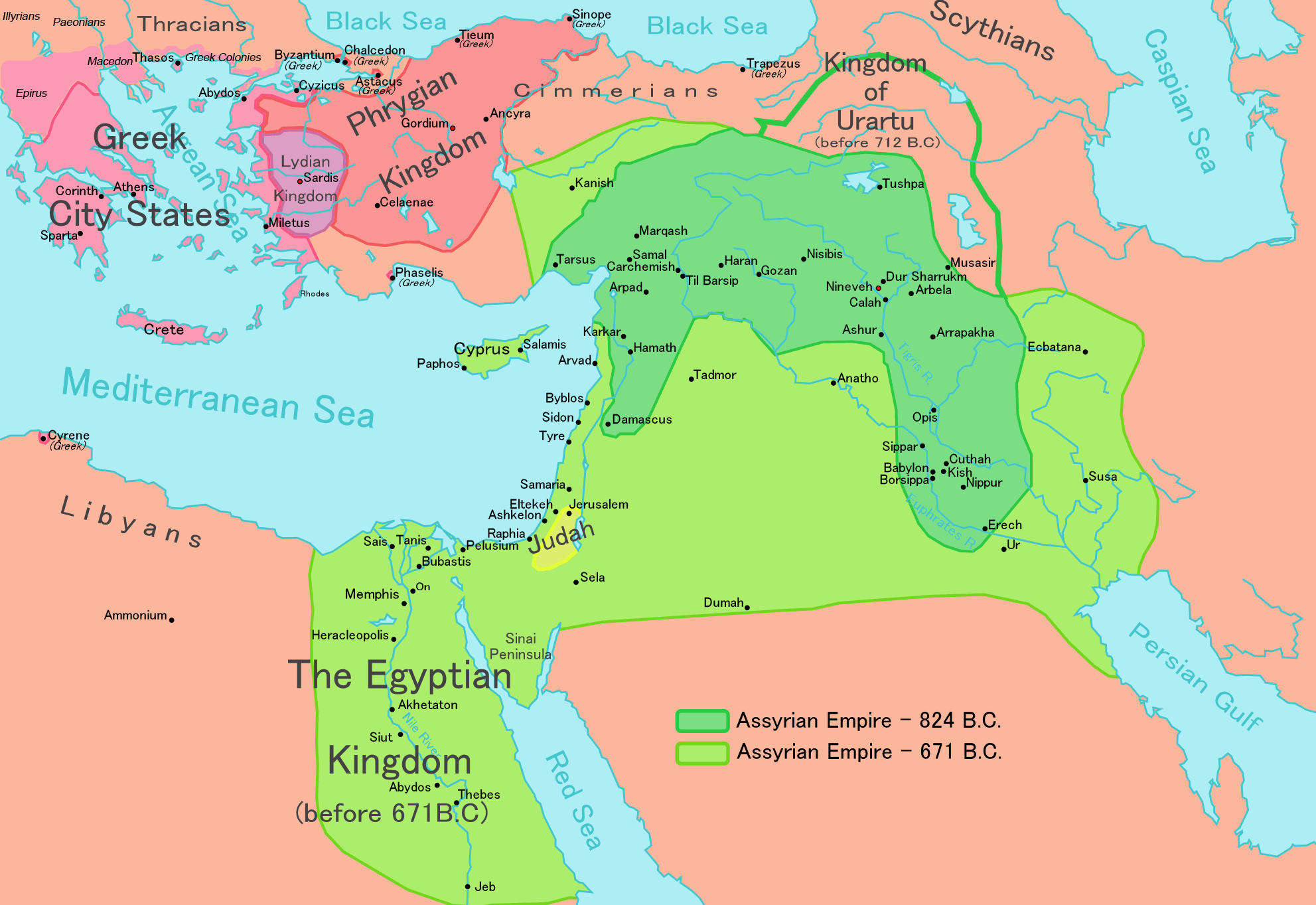
Map of the Neo-Assyrian Empire at its height in the 7th century BC

The timeline of ancient Assyria can be broken down into three main eras: the Old Assyrian period, Middle Assyrian Empire, and Neo-Assyrian Empire. Modern scholars typically also recognize an Early period preceding the Old Assyrian period and a post-imperial period succeeding the Neo-Assyrian period.

== Old Assyrian period, 2025–1364 BC ==
Puzur-Ashur I (c. 2025 BC) is thought to have been the first independent ruler of Assur following the city's independence from the collapsing Third Dynasty of Ur, founding a royal dynasty which was to survive for eight generations (or 216 years) until Erishum II was overthrown by Shamshi-Adad I. Puzur-Ashur I's descendants left inscriptions mentioning him regarding the building of temples to gods such as Ashur, Adad and Ishtar in Assyria. The length of Puzur-Ashur I's reign is unknown. Hildegard Levy, writing in the Cambridge Ancient History, sees Puzur-Ashur I as part of a longer dynasty started by Sulili, suspected by other scholars to perhaps have been a legendary figure. Inscriptions link Puzur-Ashur I to his immediate successors, who, according to the Assyrian King List, are related to the following kings down to Erishum II.

Shalim-ahum, son and successor of Puzur-Ashur I, is the earliest independent ruler to be attested in a contemporary inscription. Carved in curious archaic character mirror-writing in old Assyrian on an alabaster block found during the German excavations at Assur under Walter Andrae, this sole exemplar of his contemporary inscriptions records that the god Ashur “requested of him” the construction of a temple and that he had “beer vats and storage area” built in the “temple area.” He ruled during a period when nascent Assyrian merchant colonies were expanding into Anatolia to trade textiles and tin from Assur for silver, Shalim-ahum and his successors bore the title išši’ak aššur, vice regent of Assur, as well as ensí.

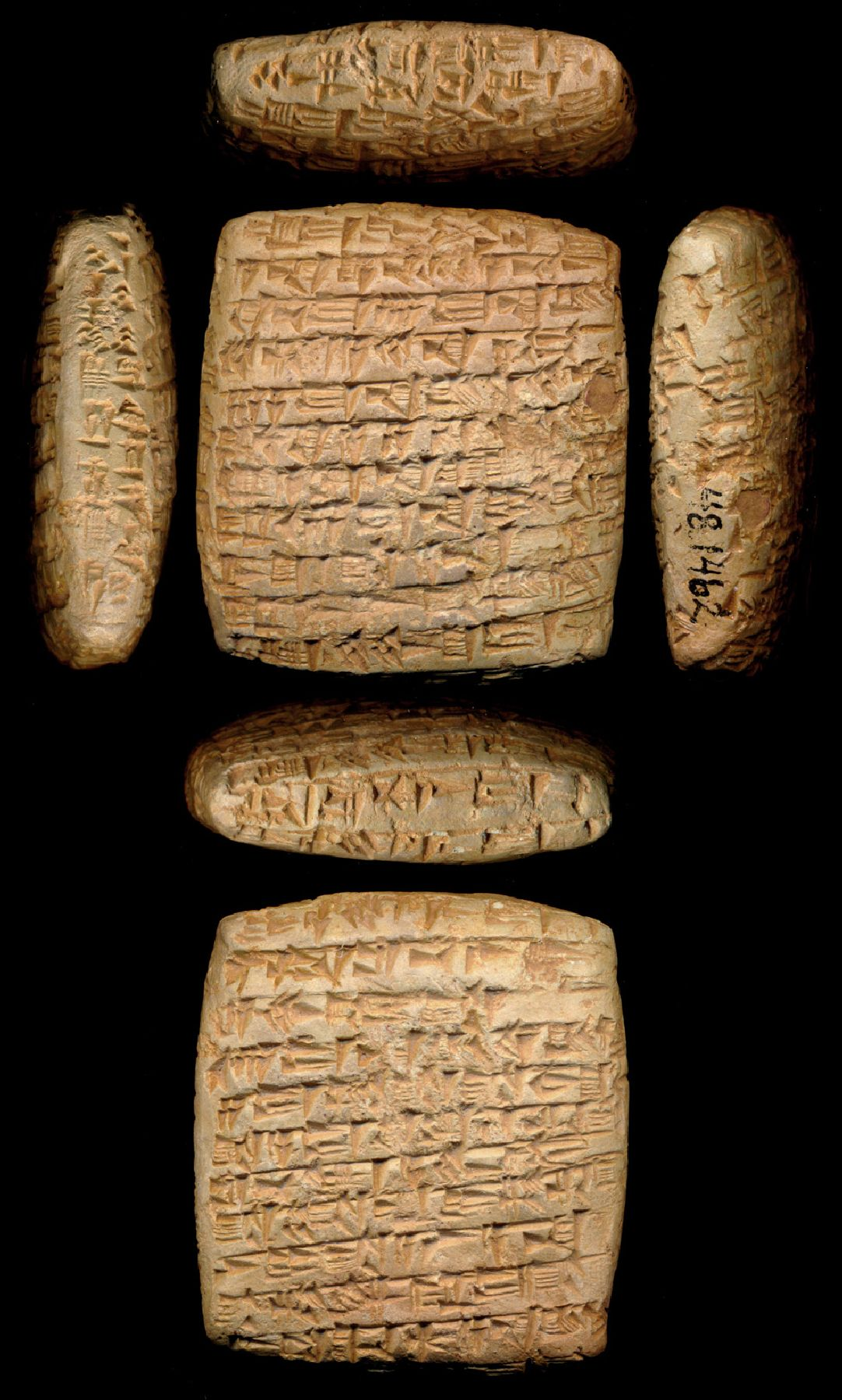
Around 20,000 clay tablets were found at the site of Karum Kanesh. Such a large find indicates that the city had an extensive commercial quarter, where foreign Assyrian merchants lived and operated. Sent from Itur-ili in Assyria to Ennam-Ashur in Karum Kanesh, this letter concerns the important trade in precious metals. Itur-ili, the senior partner, offers wise words of advice to Ennam-Ashur: "This is important; no dishonest man must cheat you! So do not succumb to drink!" c. 1850 BC - c. 1700 BC (Old Assyrian)

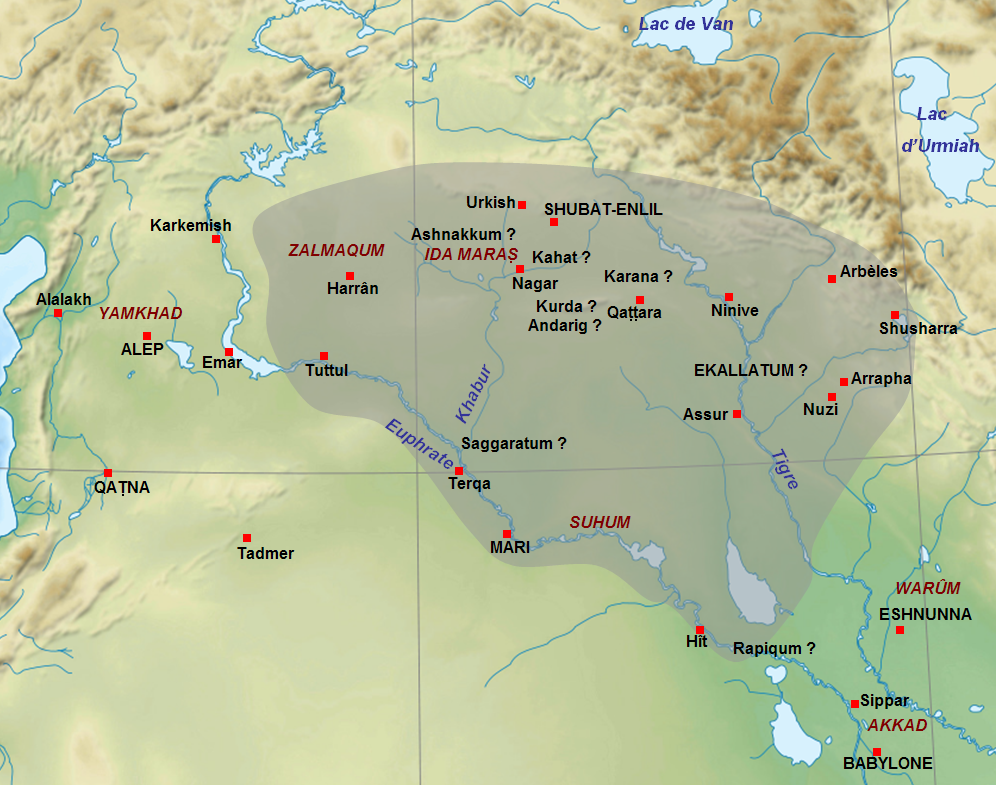
Map showing the approximate extent of the Upper Mesopotamian Empire at the death of Shamshi-Adad I c. 1721 BC.

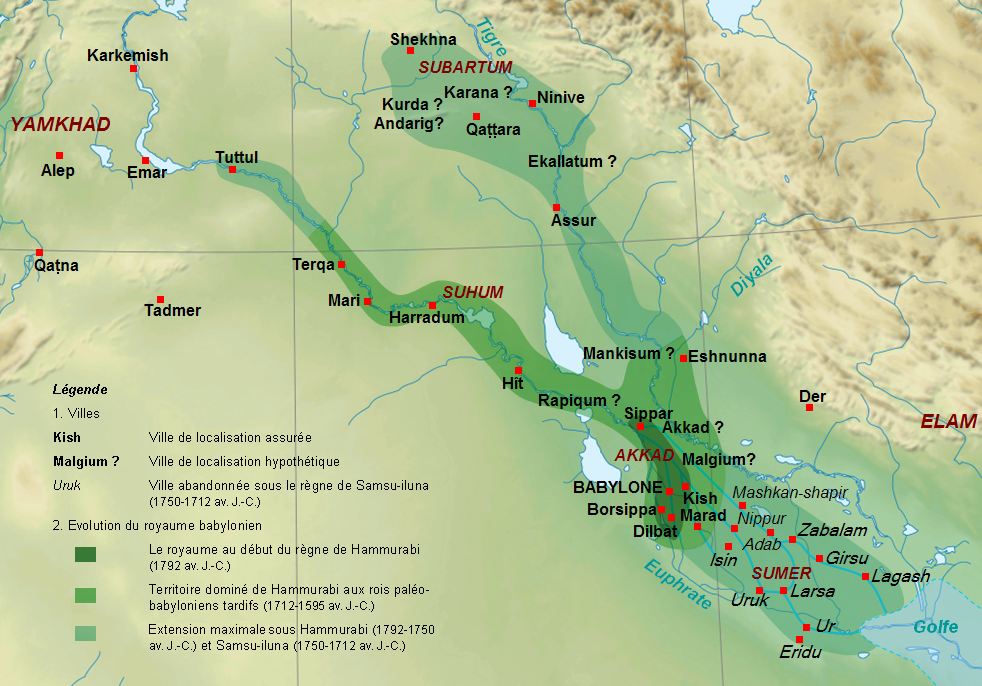
Map of the Ancient Near East showing the city-state Assur within the territory of the First Babylonian Dynasty during the reign of King Hammurabi's son and successor, Samsu-iluna (light green) c. 1654 BC.

Ilu-shuma, inscribed DINGIR-šum-ma (Note: Khorsabad copy of the Assyrian King List i 24, 26.) (c. 2008 BC – c. 1975 BC), son and successor of Shalim-ahum, and is known from his inscription (extant in several copies) where he claims to have "washed the copper" and "established liberty" for the Akkadians in the Sumerian city-states Ur, Nippur, and Der. This has been taken by some scholars to imply that he made military campaigns into Southern Mesopotamia to relieve his fellow Mesopotamians from Amorite and Elamite invasions. His construction activities included building the old temple of Ishtar, a city wall, subdivision of the city into house plots and diversion of the flow of two springs to the city gates, “Aushum” and “Wertum”.

Erishum I (c. 1974 BC – c. 1935 BC), son and successor of Ilu-shuma, vigorously expanded Assyrian colonies in Asia Minor during his long reign. It was during his reign that karums were established along trade routes into Anatolia in the cities of Kanesh, Amkuwa, Hattusa, and eighteen other locations yet to be identified, some designated warbatums, satellites of and subordinate to the karums. The colonies traded tin, textiles, lapis lazuli, iron, antimony, copper, bronze, wool, and grain.

Ikunum (c. 1934 BC – c. 1921 BC), son and successor of Ilu-shuma, built a major temple for the god Ningal. He further strengthened the fortifications of the city of Assur and maintained Assyria's colonies in Asia Minor.

Sargon I or Šarru-kīn I (c. 1920 BC – c. 1881 BC), son and successor of Ikunum, reigned as king of the Old Assyrian Empire for an unusually long 39 years. Sargon I might have been named after his predecessor Sargon of Akkad. The name “Sargon” means “the king is legitimate” in Akkadian. Sargon I is known for his work refortifying Assur. Very little is known about this king.

Puzur-Ashur II (c. 1881 BC – c. 1873 BC), son and successor of Sargon I, was king of the Old Assyrian Empire for eight years. Due to his father's long reign he came to the throne at a late age since one of his sons, named Ili-bani, was a witness in a contract (and so already a grown man) eleven years before Puzur-Ashur II became ruler.

Naram-Sin or Narām–Suen, (c. 1872 BC – c. 1818 BC), son and successor of Puzur-Ashur II, was named for the illustrious Naram-Sin of Akkad and, like his grandfather, Sargon I, took the divine determinative in his name. Assyria was wealthy as the hub of the trading network at the height of the Old Assyrian Empire's activity. Naram-Sin came under attack from Shamshi-Adad, in an attempt to usurp the Assyrian throne, however the would be usurper was defeated, and The Assyrian King List records that Shamshi-Adad I, “went away to Babylonia in the time of Narām-Sîn.” Shamshi-Adad I was not to return until taking the Assyrian city of Ekallatum, pausing three years and then overthrowing Erishum II (c. 1817 BC – c. 1809 BC), son and successor of Naram-Sin.

Shamshi-Adad I (c. 1808 BC – c. 1776 BC), conquered Assur, took over the long-abandoned town of Shekhna in north-eastern Syria, converted it into the capital city of his Upper Mesopotamian Empire and renamed it Shubat-Enlil. Shamshi-Adad I placed his sons in key geographical locations and gave them responsibility to look over those areas. While he remained in Šubat-Enlil, his eldest son, Ishme-Dagan I was put on the throne of Ekallatum.

A main target for expansion was the city Mari, which controlled the caravan route between Anatolia and Mesopotamia. The king of Mari, Iakhdunlim, was assassinated by his own servants, possibly on Shamshi-Adad I's orders. Shamshi-Adad I seized the opportunity and occupied Mari c. 1741 BC. Shamshi-Adad I put his second son, Yasmah-Adad on the throne in Mari, and then returned to Shubat-Enlil. With the annexation of Mari, Shamshi-Adad was in control of a large empire, controlling central Mesopotamia, the north eastern Levant and swathes of eastern Asia Minor.

While Ishme-Dagan I probably was a competent ruler, his brother Yasmah-Adad appears to have been a man of weak character; something the disappointed father was not above mentioning. Shamshi-Adad I clearly kept a firm control on the actions of his sons, as shown in his many letters to them. At one point he arranged a political marriage between Yasmah-Adad to Beltum, the princess of his ally in Qatna. Yasmah-Adad already had a leading wife and put Beltum in a secondary position of power. Shamshi-Adad I did not approve and forced his son to keep Beltum in the palace in a leading position.

Dadusha, a king of the neighbouring state Eshnunna, made an alliance with Shamshi-Adad I in order to conquer the area between the two Zab rivers c. 1727 BC. This military campaign of joint forces was commemorated on a victory stele which states that Dadusha gives the lands to Shmshi-Adad I. Shamshi-Adad I later turned against Dadusha by attacking cities including Shaduppum and Nerebtum.

Ishme-Dagan I (c. 1775 BC – c. 1750 BC), son and successor of Shamshi-Adad I, main challenge was in keeping his enemies in check; to his east were the foothills of the Zagros Mountains, inhabited by warlike pastoral peoples such as the Turukku, Kassites and Lullubi, and to the south was the fellow Mesopotamian kingdom of Eshnunna. Although politically astute and a capable soldier, Ishme-Dagan I became embroiled in a struggle for dominance of the Near East with Hammurabi, an Amorite who had turned the hitherto minor town of Babylon into a major city-state and begun a war of conquest, creating the Babylonian Empire. It was from this period that the southern half of Mesopotamia came to be known as Babylonia.

Mut-Ashkur (c. 1749 BC – c. 1740 BC), son and successor of Ishme-Dagan I, was arranged by his father to marry the daughter of the Hurrian king Zaziya. Hammurabi of the newly created Amorite state of Babylon (c. 1696 BC — c. 1654 BC), after first conquering Mari, Larsa, Eshnunna and defeating Elam, eventually prevailed over Mut-Ashkur. With Hammurabi, the various kārum colonies in Anatolia ceased trade activity–probably because the goods of Assyria were now being traded with the Babylonians. The Assyrian monarchy survived; however, the three Amorite kings succeeding Ishme-Dagan I (including Mut-Ashkur) were largely vassals and dependent on the Babylonians during the reign of Hammurabi.

Rimush, inscribed ^{m}ri-mu-u[š] on the only variant king list on which he appears, (Note: Assyrian Kinglist fragment VAT 9812 = KAV 14: 5.) (c. 1739 BC – c. 1733 BC), a successor to and probably a descendant of Išme-Dagān I, would appear to be named for the second king of the Akkadian Empire Rimush of Akkad (c. 2214 BC – c. 2206 BC). This perhaps reflects the extent to which Shamshi-Adad and his successors identified with the prestigious Dynasty of Akkad, although the earlier Rimush was apparently assassinated by his own courtiers, “with their seals”, according to a liver-omen of the monumental Bārûtu series, a somewhat ignominious end. The events resulting in the demise of the dynasty are witnessed in only one inscription, that of Puzur-Sin, who boasted of overthrowing the son of Asinum, descendant of Shamshi-Adad I, whose name has not been preserved. This may have been Rimush, or if Asinum followed him, perhaps his grandson. The result was apparently turmoil as a rapid succession of seven usurpers took power, each reigning briefly before being overthrown.

Asinum (c. 1732 BC), possibly successor or descendant to either Rimush or Mut-Ashkur, was an Amorite king driven out by the Assyrian vice-regent Puzur-Sin; not included in the standard King List; however, attested in Puzur-Sin's inscription. Asinum is believed to have been a descendant of Shamshi-Adad, who had founded the brief, foreign Amorite dynasty apparently greatly resented by the native Assyrians judging by an alabaster slab inscription left by Puzur-Sin. Puzur-Sin is believed to have been an otherwise unattested Assyrian monarch. Puzur-Sin deposed Asinum to allow for the Assyrian king Ashur-dugul to seize the throne. A period of civil war followed this event which ended Babylonian and Amorite influence in Assyria c. 1665 BC.

Ashur-dugul, inscribed ^{m}aš-šur-du-gul, “Look to (the god) Ashur!”, (c. 1731 BC – c. 1725 BC), apparently, “son of a nobody”, seized the throne from the three unpopular Amorite vassals. The Assyrian King List says of Ashur-dugul that he was a “son of a nobody, without right to the throne” meaning that he was not of royal descent and consequently unqualified to govern according to the patrilineal principle of legitimacy relied upon by later monarchs. During Ashur-dugul's reign six other kings, “sons of nobodies also ruled at the time”. This may suggest a fragmentation in the small Assyrian kingdom, with rival claims to the throne. Ashur-dugul was unable to retain control for long, and was soon deposed by a rival claimant, Ashur-apla-idi, who was in turn followed by Nasir-Sin, Sin-namir, Ipqi-Ishtar and Adad-salulu.

The short-lived Babylonian Empire quickly began to unravel upon the death of Hammurabi, and Babylonia quickly lost control over Assyria during the reign of Hammurabi's successor Samsu-iluna (1750–1712 BC). A period of civil war ensued after Asinum (a grandson of Shamshi-Adad I and the last Amorite ruler of Assyria) was deposed in approximately 1732 BC by a powerful native Assyrian vice regent named Puzur-Sin, who regarded Asinum as both a foreigner and a former lackey of Babylon, after which Ashur-dugul seized the throne.

After a period of civil war lasting six years, a king named Adasi (1720-1701 BC) came to the fore in 1720 BC and stabilised Assyria, inflicting further defeats on the Babylonians and their Amorite rulers, as did his successor Bel-bani (1700-1691 BC).

Adasi (c. 1724 BC – c. 1706 BC), “son of a nobody”, was the last of the six kings who ruled during the reign of Ashur-dugul. He managed to quell the civil unrest and stabilize the situation in Assyria. During his reign, he completely drove the Babylonians and Amorites from the Assyrian sphere of influence in the northern half of Mesopotamia. Babylonian-Amorite power began to quickly wane in Mesopotamia as a whole; the Sealand Dynasty of the south of Mesopotamia driving out both the Amorites and Babylonians, leaving the Amorites controlling only a weak and small rump state in and around the city of Babylon itself. The Adaside dynasty of Assyria was named after Adasi.

Bel-bani (c. 1705 BC-c. 1696 BC) succeeded Adasi and continued to campaign successfully against the Babylonians and Amorites, after which Assyria entered a quiet and peaceful period for the next two centuries.

Little is currently known of many of the kings that followed such as; Libaya (1690–1674 BC), Sharma-Adad I (1673–1662 BC), Iptar-Sin (1661–1650 BC), Bazaya (1649–1622 BC) (a contemporary of Peshgaldaramesh of the Sealand Dynasty), Lullaya (1621–1618 BC) (who usurped the throne from Bazaya), Shu-Ninua (1615–1602 BC) and Sharma-Adad II (1601–1599 BC). However, Assyria seems to have been a relatively strong and stable nation, existing undisturbed by its neighbours such as the Hattians, Hittites, Hurrians, Amorites, Babylonians, Elamites or Mitannians during this period.

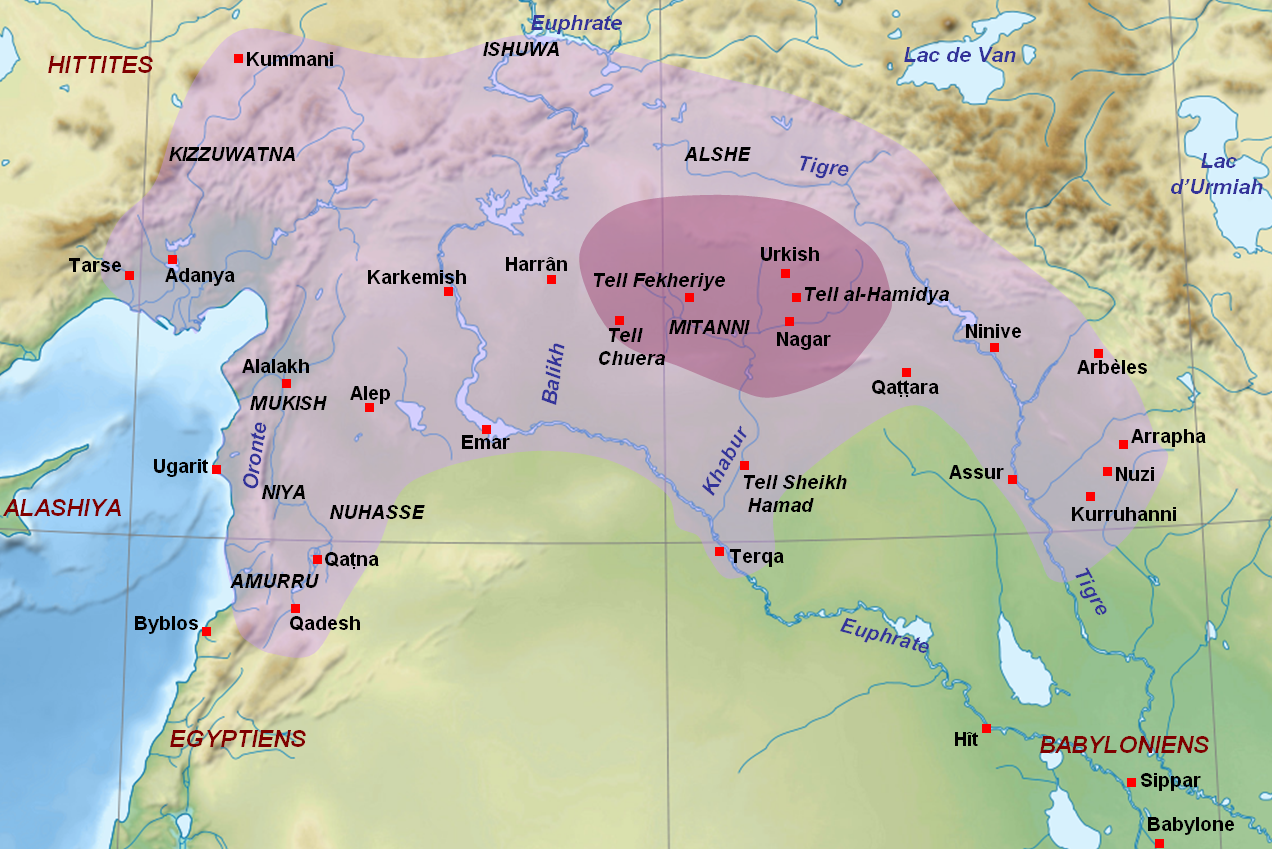
Map of the Ancient Near East showing the city-state Assur within the territory of the Mitanni at their maximum extent. The Mitanni heartland (dark purple) and the approximate maximal extension of the Mitanni dominion (light purple) c. 1430 BC.

Puzur-Ashur III (1521–1498 BC) proved to be a strong and energetic ruler. He undertook much rebuilding work in Assur, the city was refortified and the southern quarters incorporated into the main city defences. Temples to the moon god Sin (Nanna) and the sun god Shamash were erected during his reign. He signed a treaty with Burna-Buriash I the Kassite king of Babylon, defining the borders of the two nations in the late 16th century BC. He was succeeded by Enlil-nasir I (1497–1483 BC) who appears to have had a peaceful and uneventful reign, as does his successor Nur-ili (1482–1471 BC).

The son of Nur-ili, Ashur-shaduni (1470 BC) was deposed by his uncle Ashur-rabi I (1470–1451 BC) in his first year of rule. Little is known about his nineteen-year reign, but it appears to have been largely uneventful.

Ashur-nadin-ahhe I (1450–1431 BC) was courted by the Egyptians, who were rivals of Mitanni, and attempting to gain a foothold in the Near East. Amenhotep II sent the Assyrian king a tribute of gold to seal an alliance against the Hurri-Mitannian empire. It is likely that this alliance prompted Saushtatar, the emperor of Mitanni, to invade Assyria, and sack the city of Ashur, after which Assyria became a sometime vassal state, with Ashur-nadin-ahhe I being forced to pay tribute to Saushtatar. He was deposed by his own brother Enlil-nasir II (1430–1425 BC) in 1430 BC, possibly with the aid of Mitanni, who received tribute from the new king. Ashur-nirari II (1424–1418 BC) had an uneventful reign, and appears to have also paid tribute to the Mitanni Empire.

== Middle Assyrian Empire, 1363–912 BC ==
Ashur-uballit I (1365–1330 BC) succeeded the throne of Assyria in 1365 BC, and proved to be a fierce, ambitious and powerful ruler. Assyrian pressure from the southeast and Hittite pressure from the north-west, enabled Ashur-uballit I to break the power of Mitanni. He met and decisively defeated Shuttarna II, the Mitannian king in battle, making Assyria once more an imperial power at the expense of not only Mitanni itself, but also Kassite Babylonia, the Hurrians and the Hittites; and a time came when the Kassite king in Babylon was glad to marry Muballiṭat-Šērūa, the daughter of Ashur-uballit, whose letters to Akhenaten of Egypt form part of the Amarna letters.

This marriage led to disastrous results for Babylonia, as the Kassite faction at court murdered the half Assyrian Babylonian king and placed a pretender on the throne. Assur-uballit I promptly invaded Babylonia to avenge his son-in-law, entering Babylon, deposing the king and installing Kurigalzu II of the royal line as king there.

In 1274 BC Shalmaneser I (1274–1244 BC) ascended the throne. He proved to be a great warrior king. During his reign he conquered the Hurrian kingdom of Urartu that would have encompassed most of Eastern Anatolia and the Caucasus Mountains in the 9th century BC, and the fierce Gutians of the Zagros. He then attacked the Mitannian-Hurrians, defeating both King Shattuara and his Hittite and Aramaean allies, finally completely destroying the Hurri-Mitannian kingdom in the process. Like his father, Shalmaneser was a great builder and he further expanded the city of Kalhu at the juncture of the Tigris and Zab Rivers.

Ashur-uballit I attacked and defeated Mattiwaza, the king of Mitanni, despite attempts by the Hittite king Šuppiluliuma I, now fearful of growing Assyrian power, to help Mitanni. The lands of the Hurrians and Mitanni were duly appropriated by Assyria, making it a large and powerful empire.

By the reign of Eriba-Adad I (1392–1366 BC) Mitannian influence over Assyria was on the wane. Eriba-Adad I became involved in a dynastic battle between Tushratta and his brother Artatama II and after this his son Shuttarna III, who called himself king of the Hurri while seeking support from the Assyrians. A pro-Assyria faction appeared at the royal court of Mitanni. Eriba-Adad I had thus finally broken Mitannian influence over Assyria, and in turn had now made Assyria an influence over Mitannian affairs.

Enlil-nirari (1329–1308 BC) succeeded Ashur-uballit I. He described himself as "Great-King" (Sharru rabû) in letters to the Hittite kings. He was immediately attacked by Kurigalzu II of Babylon who had been installed by his father, but succeeded in defeating him, repelling Babylonian attempts to invade Assyria, counterattacking and appropriating Babylonian territory in the process, thus further expanding Assyria.

The successor of Enlil-nirari, Arik-den-ili (c. 1307–1296 BC), consolidated Assyrian power, and successfully campaigned in the Zagros Mountains to the east, subjugating the Lullubi and Gutians. In Syria, he defeated Semitic tribes of the so-called Ahlamu group, who were possibly predecessors of the Arameans or an Aramean tribe.

He was followed by Adad-nirari I (1295–1275 BC) who made Kalhu (Biblical Calah or Nimrud) his capital, and continued expansion to the northwest, mainly at the expense of the Hittites and Hurrians, conquering Hittite territories such as Carchemish and beyond. He then moved into northeastern Asia Minor, conquering Shupria. Adad-nirari I made further gains to the south, annexing Babylonian territory and forcing the Kassite rulers of Babylon into accepting a new frontier agreement in Assyria's favour.

Adad-nirari's inscriptions are more detailed than any of his predecessors. He declares that the gods of Mesopotamia called him to war, a statement used by most subsequent Assyrian kings. He referred to himself again as Sharru Rabi (meaning 'The Great King' in the Akkadian language) and conducted extensive building projects in Ashur and the provinces.

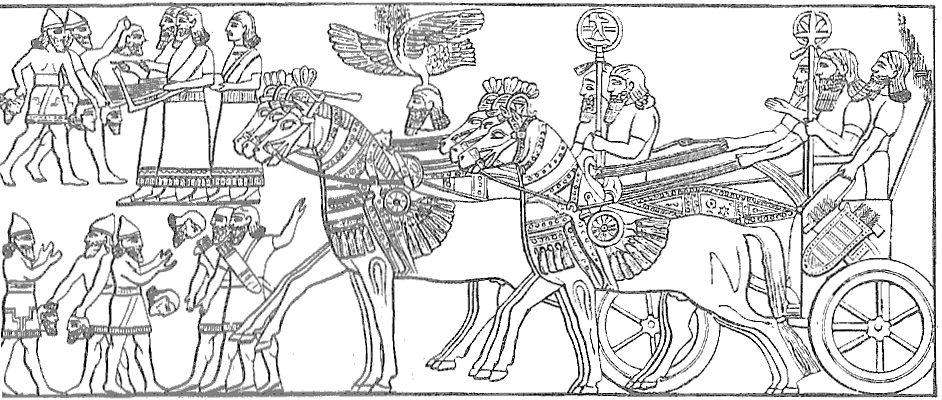
Assyrian troops return after victory.

Shalmaneser's son and successor, Tukulti-Ninurta I (1244–1207 BC), won a major victory against the Hittites and their king Tudhaliya IV at the Battle of Nihriya and took thousands of prisoners. He then conquered Babylonia, taking Kashtiliash IV as a captive and ruled there himself as king for seven years, taking on the old title "King of Sumer and Akkad" first used by Sargon of Akkad. Tukulti-Ninurta I thus became the first Akkadian speaking native Mesopotamian to rule the state of Babylonia, its founders having been foreign Amorites, succeeded by equally foreign Kassites. Tukulti-Ninurta petitioned the god Shamash before beginning his counter offensive. Kashtiliash IV was captured, single-handed by Tukulti-Ninurta according to his account, who "trod with my feet upon his lordly neck as though it were a footstool" and deported him ignominiously in chains to Assyria.

The victorious Assyrian demolished the walls of Babylon, massacred many of the inhabitants, pillaged and plundered his way across the city to the Esagila temple, where he made off with the statue of Marduk. He then proclaimed himself "king of Karduniash, king of Sumer and Akkad, king of Sippar and Babylon, king of Tilmun and Meluhha." Middle Assyrian texts recovered at ancient Dūr-Katlimmu, include a letter from Tukulti-Ninurta to his sukkal rabi'u, or 'grand vizier', Ashur-iddin advising him of the approach of his general Shulman-mushabshu escorting the captive Kashtiliash, his wife, and his retinue which incorporated a large number of women, on his way to exile after his defeat. In the process he defeated the Elamites, who had themselves coveted Babylon. He also wrote an epic poem documenting his wars against Babylon and Elam. After a Babylonian revolt, he raided and plundered the temples in Babylon, regarded as an act of sacrilege. As relations with the priesthood in Ashur began deteriorating, Tukulti-Ninurta built a new capital city; Kar-Tukulti-Ninurta.

He stretched the Assyrian Empire further south than before, conquering Dilmun, a pre-Arab civilisation of the Arabian Peninsula that encompassed modern Bahrain, Kuwait, Qatar and the coastal regions of the Eastern Province of Saudi Arabia.

However, Tukulti-Ninurta's sons rebelled and besieged the ageing king in his capital. He was murdered and then succeeded by Ashur-nadin-apli (1206–1203 BC) who left the running of his empire to Assyrian regional governors such as Adad-bēl-gabbe. Another unstable period for Assyria followed, it was riven by periods of internal strife and the new king only made token and unsuccessful attempts to recapture Babylon, whose Kassite kings had taken advantage of the upheavals in Assyria and freed themselves from Assyrian rule. However, Assyria itself was not threatened by foreign powers during the reigns of Ashur-nirari III (1202–1197 BC), Enlil-kudurri-usur (1196–1193 BC) and Ninurta-apal-Ekur (1192–1180 BC), although Ninurta-apal-Ekur usurped the throne from Enlil-kudurri-usur.

Another very brief period of internal upheaval followed the death of Ashur-Dan I when his son and successor Ninurta-tukulti-Ashur (1133 BC) was deposed in his first year of rule by his brother Mutakkil-Nusku and forced to flee to Babylonia. Mutakkil-Nusku himself died in the same year (1133 BC).

A third brother, Ashur-resh-ishi I (1133–1116 BC) took the throne. This was to lead to a renewed period of Assyrian expansion and empire. As the Hittite empire collapsed from the onslaught of the Indo-European Phrygians (called Mushki in Assyrian annals), Babylon and Assyria began to vie for Aramaean regions (in modern Syria), formerly under firm Hittite control. When their forces encountered one another in this region, the Assyrian king Ashur-resh-ishi I met and defeated Nebuchadnezzar I of Babylon on a number of occasions. Assyria then invaded and annexed Hittite-controlled lands in Asia Minor, Aram (Syria), and Gutians and Kassite regions in the Zagros, marking an upsurge in imperian expansion.

Tiglath-Pileser I (1115–1077 BC), vies with Shamshi-Adad I and Ashur-uballit I among historians as being regarded as the founder of the first Assyrian empire. The son of Ashur-resh-ishi I, he ascended to the throne upon his father's death, and became one of the greatest of Assyrian conquerors during his 38-year reign.

His first campaign in 1112 BC was against the Phrygians who had attempted to occupy certain Assyrian districts in the Upper Euphrates region of Asia Minor; after defeating and driving out the Phrygians he then overran the Luwian kingdoms of Commagene, Cilicia and Cappadocia in western Asia Minor, and drove the Neo-Hittites from the Assyrian province of Subartu, northeast of Malatya.

=== Bronze Age collapse ===
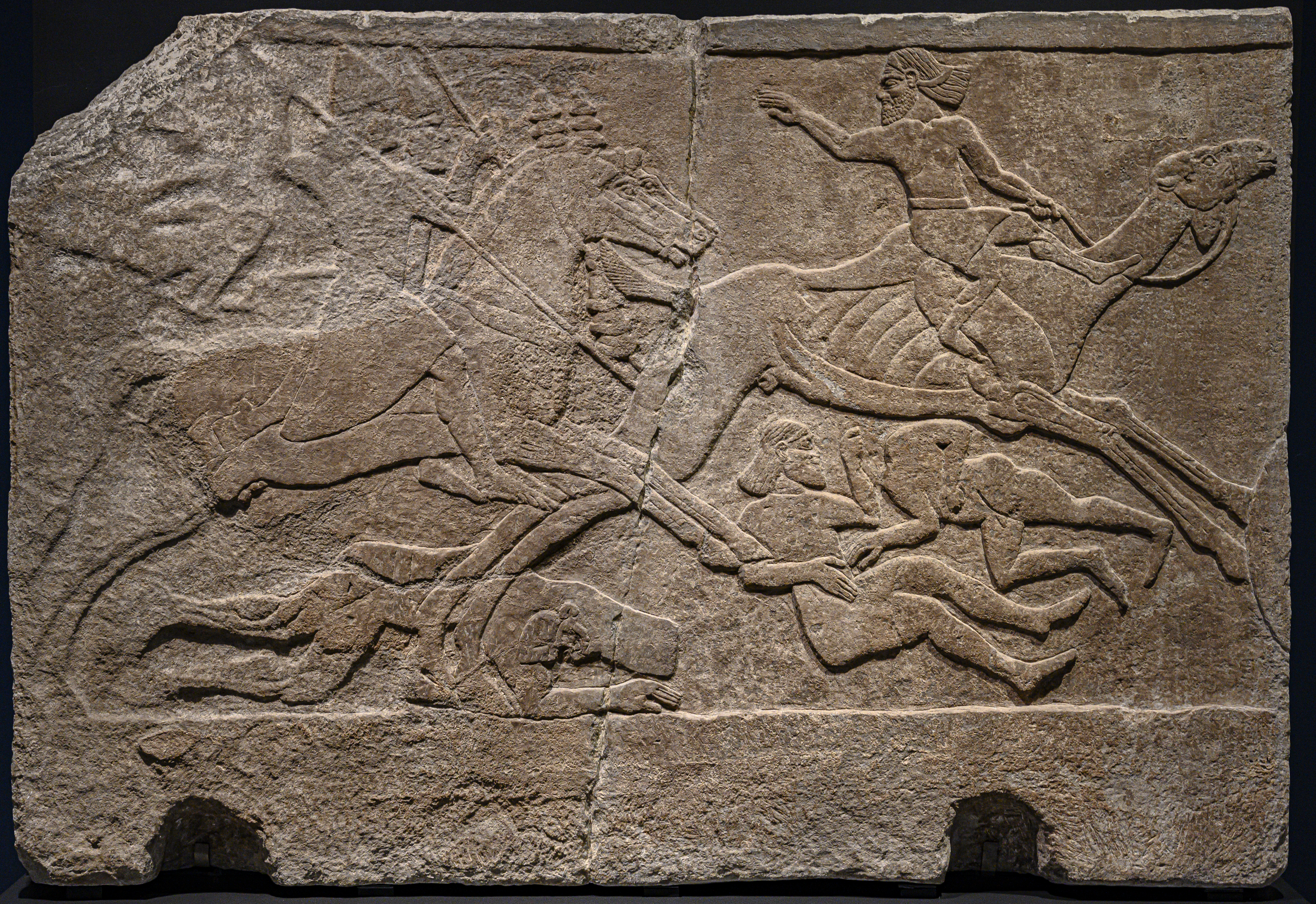
Assyrian relief depicting battle with camel riders, from Kalhu (Nimrud) Central Palace, Tiglath Pileser III, 728 BCE, British Museum

In a subsequent campaign, the Assyrian forces penetrated Urartu, into the mountains south of Lake Van and then turned westward to receive the submission of Malatia. In his fifth year, Tiglath-Pileser again attacked Commagene, Cilicia and Cappadocia, and placed a record of his victories engraved on copper plates in a fortress he built to secure his Anatolian conquests.

He was succeeded by Asharid-apal-Ekur (1076–1074 BC) who reigned for just two years. His reign marked the elevation of the office of ummânu (royal scribe) in importance.

Ashur-bel-kala (1073–1056 BC) kept the vast empire together, campaigning successfully against Urartu and Phrygia to the north and the Arameans to the west. He maintained friendly relations with Marduk-shapik-zeri of Babylon, however upon the death of that king, he invaded Babylonia and deposed the new ruler Kadašman-Buriaš, appointing Adad-apla-iddina as his vassal in Babylon. He built some of the earliest examples of both zoological gardens and botanical gardens in Ashur, collecting all manner of animals and plants from his empire, and receiving a collection of African exotic animals from Egypt. He was also a great hunter, describing his exploits "at the city of Araziqu which is before the land of Hatti and at the foot of Mount Lebanon." These locations show that well into his reign Assyria still controlled a vast empire.

Ashur-Dan I (1179–1133 BC) stabilised the internal unrest in Assyria during his unusually long reign, quelling instability. During the twilight years of the Kassite dynasty in Babylonia, he records that he seized northern Babylonia, including the cities of Zaban, Irriya and Ugar-sallu during the reigns of Marduk-apla-iddina I and Zababa-shuma-iddin, plundering them and "taking their vast booty to Assyria." However, the conquest of northern Babylonia brought Assyria into direct conflict with Elam which had taken the remainder of Babylonia. The powerful Elamites, under king Shutruk-Nahhunte, fresh from sacking Babylon, entered into a protracted war with Assyria, they briefly took the Assyrian city of Arrapḫa, which Ashur-Dan I then retook, eventually defeating the Elamites and forcing a treaty upon them in the process.

Eriba-Adad II ruled for only two years, and in that time continued to campaign against the Arameans and neo-Hittites before he was deposed by his elderly uncle Shamshi-Adad IV (1053–1050 BC) who appears to have had an uneventful reign. Ashurnasirpal I (1049–1031 BC) succeeded him, and during his reign he continued to campaign endlessly against the Arameans to the west. Assyria was also afflicted by famine during this period. Shalmaneser II (1030–1019 BC) appears to have lost territory in the Levant to the Arameans, who also appear to have also occupied Nairi in southeast Asia Minor, hitherto an Assyrian colony.

Ashur-nirari IV took the throne in 1018 BC, and captured the Babylonian city of Atlila from Simbar-Shipak and continued Assyrian campaigns against the Arameans. He was eventually deposed by his uncle Ashur-rabi II in 1013 BC.

During the reign of Ashur-rabi II (1013–972 BC) Aramaean tribes took the cities of Pitru and Mutkinu (which had been taken and colonized by Tiglath Pileser I.) This event showed how far Assyria could assert itself militarily when the need arose. The Assyrian king attacked the Arameans, forced his way to the far off Mediterranean and constructed a stele in the area of Mount Atalur.

Ashur-resh-ishi II (971–968 BC) in all likelihood a fairly elderly man due to the length of his father's reign, had a largely uneventful period of rule, concerning himself with defending Assyria's borders and conducting various rebuilding projects within Assyria.

Tiglath-Pileser II (967–936 BC) succeeded him, and reigned for 28 years. He maintained the policies of his recent predecessors, but appears to have had an uneventful reign.

His successor, Tukulti-Ninurta II (891–884 BC) consolidated Assyria's gains and expanded into the Zagros Mountains in modern Iran, subjugating the newly arrived Persians, Parthians and Medes as well as pushing into central Asia Minor.

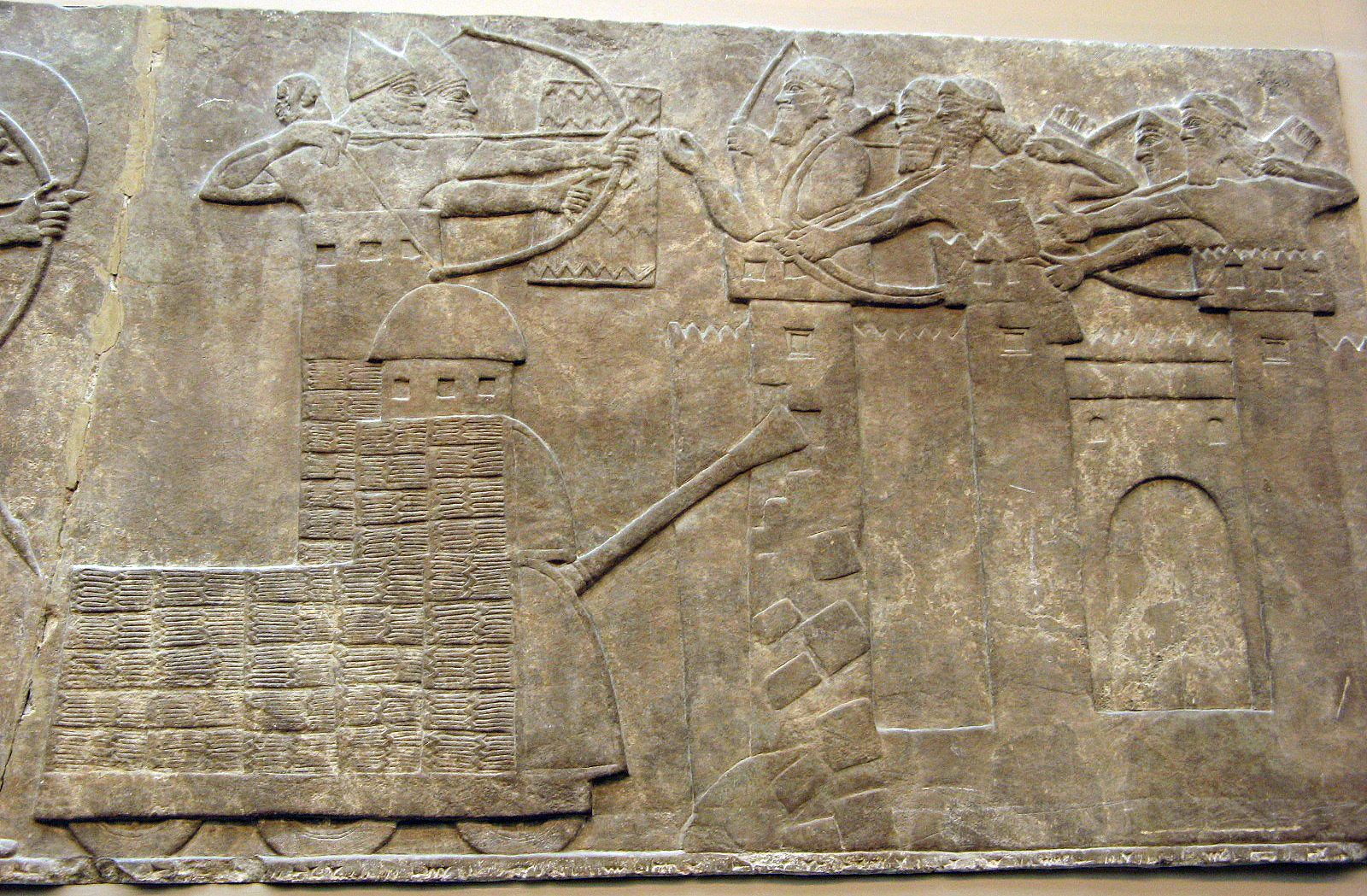
Assyrian attack on a town with archers and a wheeled battering ram, 865–860 BC

Ashurnasirpal II (883–859 BC) was a fierce and ruthless ruler who advanced without opposition through Aram and Canaan (modern Syria, Lebanon, Jordan and Israel) and Asia Minor as far as the Mediterranean and conquered and exacted tribute from Aramea, Phrygia and Phoenicia among others. Ashurnasirpal II also repressed revolts among the Medes and Persians in the Zagros Mountains, and moved his capital to the city of Kalhu (Calah/Nimrud). The palaces, temples and other buildings raised by him bear witness to a considerable development of wealth, science, architecture and art. He also built a number of new heavily fortified towns, such as Imgur-Enlil (Balawat), Tushhan, Kar-Ashurnasirpal and Nibarti-Ashur. Ashurnasirpal II also had a keen interest in botany and zoology; collecting all manner of plants, seeds and animals to be displayed in Assyria.

Tiglath-Pileser III (745–727 BC), a usurper whose original name was Pulu, initiated a renewed period of Assyrian expansion; Urartu, Persia, Media, Mannea, Babylonia, Arabia, Phoenicia, Israel, Judah, Samaria, Nabatea, Chaldea, Cyprus, Moab, Edom and the Neo-Hittites were subjugated, Tiglath-Pileser III was declared king in Babylon and the Assyrian empire was now stretched from the Caucasus Mountains to Arabia and from the Caspian Sea to Cyprus.

Ashur-Dan II (935–912 BC) oversaw a marked economic and organisational upturn in the fortunes of Assyria, laying the platform for it to once again forge an empire. He is recorded as having made successful punitive raids outside the borders of Assyria to clear Aramean and other tribal peoples from the regions surrounding Assyria in all directions. He concentrated on rebuilding Assyria within its natural borders, from Tur Abdin to Arrapḫa (Kirkuk), he built government offices in all provinces, and created a major economic boost by providing ploughs throughout the land, which yielded record grain production.

== Neo-Assyrian Empire, 911–609 BC ==
Shalmaneser III (858–823 BC) had his authority challenged by a large alliance of a dozen nations, some of which were vassals, including; Babylonia, Egypt, Elam, Persia, Israel, Hamath, Phoenicia, the Arabs, Arameans, Suteans and Neo-Hittites among others, fighting them to a standstill at the Battle of Qarqar. The failure of this alliance prevented pharaoh Osorkon II from regaining an Egyptian foothold in the Near East.

Subsequent to this, Shalmaneser III attacked and reduced Babylonia to vassalage, including subjugating the Chaldean, Aramean and Sutean tribes settled within it. He then defeated Aramea, Israel, Moab, Edom, Urartu, Phoenicia, the Neo-Hittite states and the desert dwelling Arabs of the Arabian Peninsula, forcing all of these to pay tribute to Assyria.

It is in Assyrian accounts of the late 850's BC, recorded during the reign of Shalmaneser III, that the Arabs and Chaldeans first enter the pages of written history.

His armies penetrated to The Caucasus, Lake Van, and the Taurus Mountains; the Hittites around Carchemish were compelled to pay tribute, and the kingdoms of Hamath and Aram Damascus were subdued. In 831 BC, he received the submission of the Georgian kingdom of Tabal. He consolidated Assyrian control over the regions conquered by his predecessors and, by the end of his 27-year reign, Assyria was master of Mesopotamia, The Levant, western Iran, Israel, Jordan and much of Asia Minor. Due to old age, in the last six years of his reign, he passed command of his armies to the "Turtanu" (General) Dayyan-Assur.

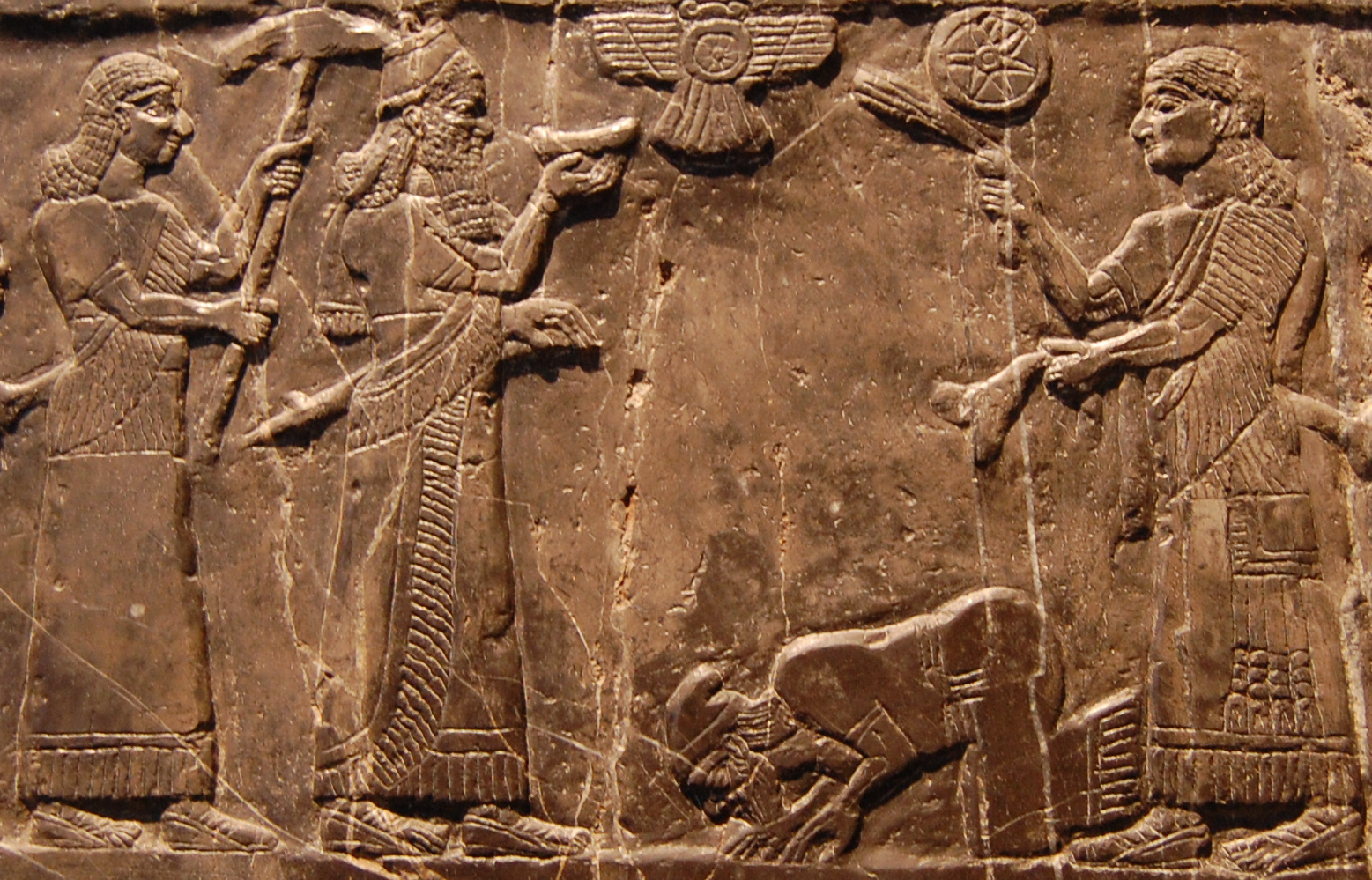
Jehu, king of Israel, bows before Shalmaneser III of Assyria, 825 BC

However, his successor, Shamshi-Adad V (822–811 BC) (also known as Shamshi-Ramman II), inherited an empire beset by civil war in Assyria itself. The first years of his reign saw a serious struggle for the succession of the aged Shalmaneser III. The revolt, which had broken out by 826 BC, was led by Shamshi-Adad's brother Assur-danin-pal. The rebellious brother, according to Shamshi-Adad's own inscriptions, succeeded in bringing to his side 27 important cities, including Nineveh and Babylon. The rebellion lasted until 820 BC, preventing Assyria expanding its empire further until it was quelled.

Later in his reign, Shamshi-Adad V successfully campaigned against both Babylonia and Elam, and forced a treaty in Assyria's favour on the Babylonian king Marduk-zakir-shumi I. In 814 BCE, he won the battle of Dur-Papsukkal against the new Babylonian king Murduk-balassu-iqbi, and went on to subjugate the immigrant tribes of Chaldeans, Arameans, and Suteans who had recently settled in parts of Babylonia.

He was succeeded by Adad-nirari III (810–782 BC), who was merely a boy. The Empire was thus ruled by his mother, the famed queen Semiramis (Shammuramat), until 806 BC. Semiramis held the empire together, and appears to have campaigned successfully in subjugating the Persians, Parthians and Medes during her regency, leading to the later Iranian and also Greek myths and legends surrounding her.

In 806 BC, Adad-nirari III took the reins of power from Semiramis. He invaded the Levant and subjugated the Arameans, Phoenicians, Philistines, Israelites, Neo-Hittites, Moabites and Edomites. He entered Damascus and forced tribute upon its Aramean king Ben-Hadad III. He next turned eastward to Iran, and subjugated the Persians, Medes and the pre Iranian Manneans, penetrating as far north east as the Caspian Sea. He then turned south, forcing Babylonia to pay tribute. His next targets were the migrant Aramean, Chaldean and Sutu tribes, who had settled in the far south eastern corner of Mesopotamia, whom he conquered and reduced to vassalage. Then the Arabs in the deserts of the Arabian Peninsula to the south of Mesopotamia were invaded, vanquished and forced to pay tribute also.

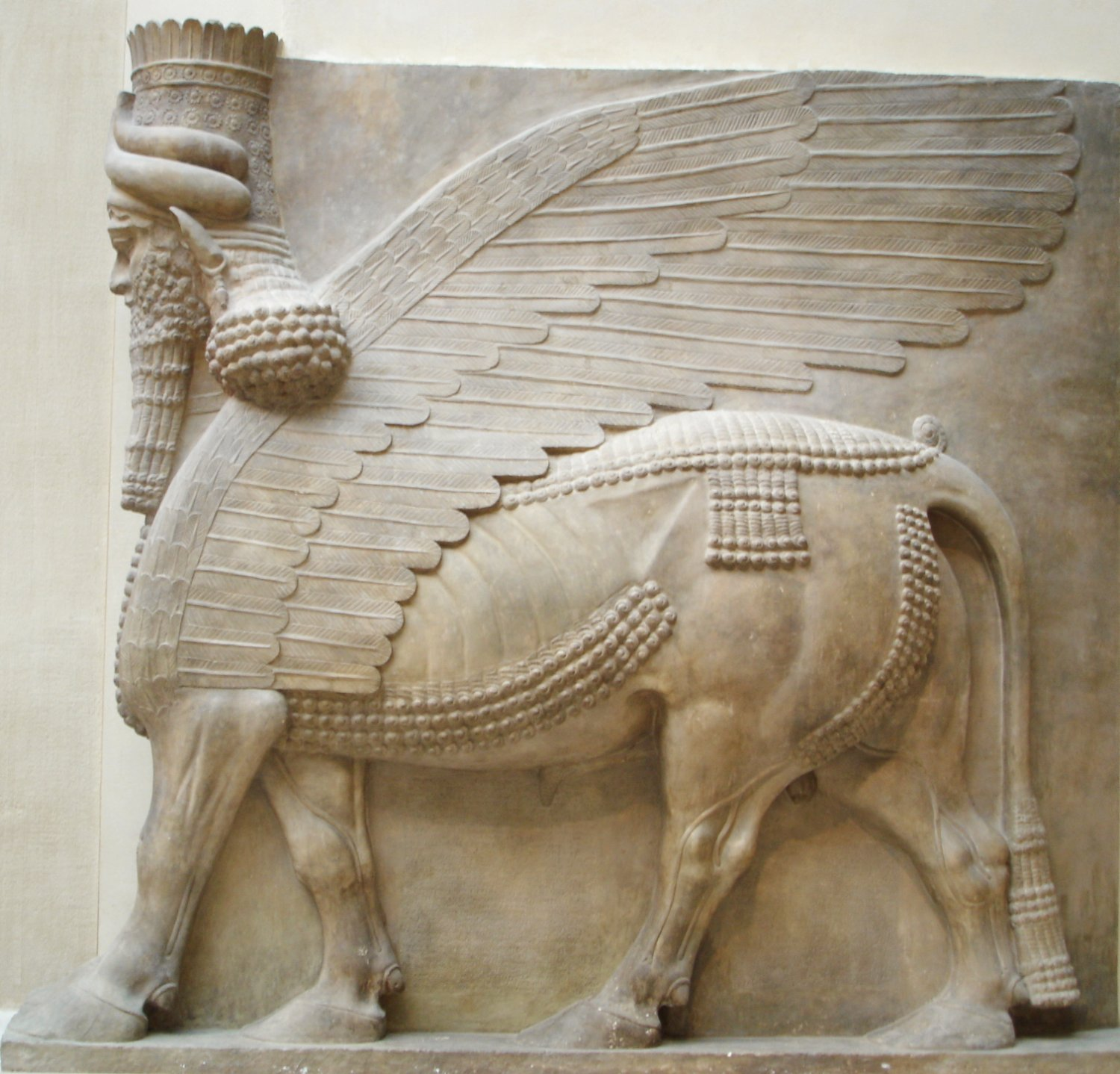
A lamassu from the palace of Sargon II at Dur-Sharrukin.

It is from this general period that the Cilician Indo-Anatolian term Surai (Syria) first appears in historical record in what is now called the Çineköy inscription, not in reference to the region of Aramea now encompassing modern Syria in the Levant, but specifically and only to Assyria itself.

Adad-nirari III died prematurely in 782 BC, which led to a temporary period of stagnation within the empire. Assyria continued its military dominance, however Shalmaneser IV (782 - 773 BC) himself seems to have wielded little personal authority, and a victory over Argishti I, king of Urartu at Til Barsip is accredited to an Assyrian General (Turtanu) named Shamshi-ilu, who does not even bother to mention his king. Shamshi-ilu also scored victories over the Arameans, Phrygians, Persians and Neo-Hittites, and again, takes personal credit at the expense of his king.

Ashur-dan III ascended the throne in 772 BC. He proved to be a largely ineffectual ruler who was beset by internal rebellions in the cities of Ashur, Arrapḫa and Guzana; and his personal authority was checked by powerful generals, such as Shamshi-ilu. He failed to make any further gains in Babylonia, Canaan and Aram. His reign was also marred by Plague and an ominous solar eclipse and, as with his predecessor, military victories were credited to Shamshi-ilu.

Ashur-nirari V became king in 754 BC, the early part of his reign seems to have been one of permanent internal revolution, and he appears to have barely left his palace in Nineveh. However, later in his reign he led a number of successful campaigns in Asia Minor and the Levant. He was deposed by Tiglath-Pileser III in 745 BC bringing a resurgence to Assyrian expansion.

Shalmaneser V (726–723 BC) consolidated Assyrian power during his short reign, and repressed Egyptian attempts to gain a foothold in the near east, defeating and driving out Pharaoh Shoshenq V from the region. He is mentioned in Biblical sources as having conquered Israel and being responsible for deporting the Ten Lost Tribes of Israel to Assyria. He and his successor also brought the Samaritans, people originating from Babylon, Cuthah, Ava, Sepharvaim and Hamath, and settled them in the towns of Samaria to replace the Israelites.

Tiglath-Pileser III had reorganised the Assyrian army into a professional fighting force, he also incorporated conquered peoples into the imperial army to serve as light infantry, thus expanding the size of the army. He greatly improved the civil administration of his empire, reducing the influence of hitherto powerful nobles, regional governors and viceroys, and deporting troublesome peoples to other parts of his vast empire, setting the template for all future ancient empires. Tiglath-Pileser III also introduced Mesopotamian Eastern Aramaic as the Lingua Franca of Assyria and its vast empire, whose Akkadian infused descendant dialects still survive among the modern Assyrian Christian people to this day.

Beginning with the campaigns of Adad-nirari II (911–892 BC), Assyria once more became a great power, growing to be the greatest empire the world had yet seen. The new king firmly subjugated the areas that were previously only under nominal Assyrian vassalage, conquering and deporting troublesome Aramean, Neo-Hittite and Hurrian populations in the north to far-off places. Adad-nirari II then twice attacked and defeated Shamash-mudammiq of Babylonia, annexing a large area of land north of the Diyala River and the towns of Hīt and Zanqu in mid Mesopotamia. Later in his reign, he made further gains against King Nabu-shuma-ukin I of Babylonia. He then conquered Kadmuh and Nisibin from the Arameans, and secured the Khabur region.

In 716 BCE Sargon II crossed the Sinai and amassed an army on Egypt's border. Osorkon IV personally met the Assyrian king at the "Brook of Egypt" (most likely el-Arish) and was forced pay tribute to Sargon II to avoid being invaded. Mannea, Cilicia Cappadocia and Commagene were conquered, Urartu was ravaged, and Babylonia, Chaldea, Aram, Phoenicia, Israel, Arabia, Cyprus and the famed Midas (king of Phrygia) were forced to pay tribute. His stele has been found as far west as Larnaca in Cyprus. Sargon II conquered Gurgum, Milid, the Georgian state of Tabal, and all of the Neo-Hittite kingdoms of the Taurus Mountains. Egypt, now under a Nubian dynasty, once again attempted to gain ground in the region by supporting Israel's rebellion against the empire, however Sargon II once again crushed the uprising, and Piye was routed and driven back over the Sinai. Sargon II was killed in 705 BC while on a punitive raid against the Cimmerians, and was succeeded by Sennacherib.

Sargon II (722–705 BC) maintained the empire, driving the Cimmerians and Scythians from Ancient Iran, where they had invaded and attacked the Persians and Medes, who were vassals of Assyria. Deioces, king of the Medes and Persians was then forced to pay tribute after launching a failed rebellion against Assyria. When in 720 BCE a revolt occurred in Canaan against Sargon II, king Hanno sought the help of Pharaoh Osorkon IV of the 22nd Dynasty of Egypt. The Egyptian king sent a general named Raia as well as troops in order to support the neighboring ally. However, the coalition was defeated in battle at Raphia: Raia fled back to Egypt, Raphia and Gaza were looted and Hanno was burnt alive by the Assyrians.

Sennacherib (705–681 BC), a ruthless ruler, defeated the Greeks who were attempting to gain a foothold in Cilicia, and then defeated and drove the Nubian ruled Egyptians from the Near East where the new Nubian Pharaoh Taharqa had once again fomented revolt against Assyria among the Israelites, Judeans and Canaanites.

Sennacherib was forced to contend with a major revolt within his empire, which included a large alliance of subject peoples, including Babylonians, Persians, Medes, Chaldeans, Elamites, Parthians, Manneans and Arameans. The prime movers in this rebellion were Mushezib-Marduk of Babylonia, Achaemenes of Persia, Khumban-umena III of Elam, and Deioces of Media. The Battle of Halule was fought in 691 BC between Sennacherib and his enemies, in which this vast alliance failed to overthrow Sennacherib. The Assyrian king was then able to subjugate these nations individually, Babylon was sacked and largely destroyed by Sennacherib. He sacked Israel, subjugated the Samaritans and laid siege to Judah, forcing tribute upon it. He installed his own son Ashur-nadin-shumi as king in Babylonia. He maintained Assyrian domination over the Medes, Manneans and Persians to the east, Asia Minor and the southern Caucasus to the north and north west, and the Levant, Phoenicia and Aram in the west.

Esarhaddon also completely rebuilt Babylon during his reign, bringing peace to Mesopotamia as a whole. The Babylonians, Egyptians, Elamites, Cimmerians, Scythians, Persians, Medes, Manneans, Arameans, Chaldeans, Israelites, Phoenicians and Urartians were vanquished and regarded as vassals and Assyria's empire was kept secure.

Sennacherib's palace and garden at Nineveh have been proposed by some scholars as the true location of the Hanging Gardens of Babylon. During the reign of Sennacherib, the major city of Nineveh (extant since approximately 3000 BC) which at the end of the Bronze Age had a population of 35,000, was transformed into the capital of Assyria, growing at its height to be the largest city in the world at the time, with a population of up to 150,000 people.

Sennacherib was murdered by his sons (according to the Bible the sons were named Adrammelech, and Sharezer) in a palace revolt, apparently in revenge for the destruction of Babylon, a city sacred to all Mesopotamians, including the Assyrians.

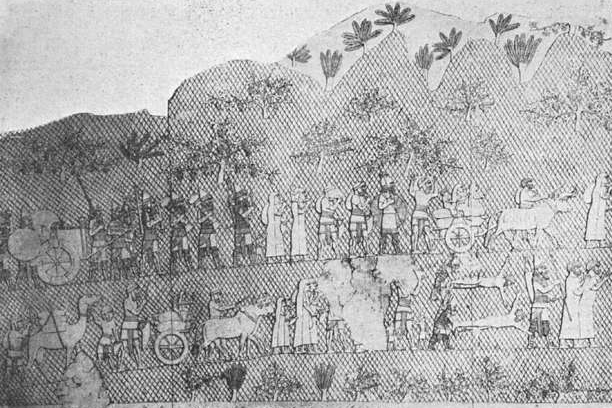
Judean captives being led away into slavery by the Assyrians after the siege of Lachish in 701 BC

To the west, the kings of Judah, Edom, Moab, Israel, Sidon, Ekron, Byblos, Arvad, Samarra, Ammon, Amalek, and the ten Greek kings of Cyprus, are listed as Assyrian subjects. Esarhaddon expanded the empire as far south as Arabia, Meluhha, Magan and Dilmun (modern Saudi Arabia, Bahrain the United Arab Emirates and Qatar).

The conquest by Esarhaddon effectively marked the end of the short-lived Kushite Empire. He imposed a so-called Vassal Treaty upon his Persian, Parthian and Median subjects, forcing Teispes of Persia and Deioces of Media to submit both to himself, and in advance to his chosen successor, Ashurbanipal. Esarhaddon died whilst preparing to leave for Egypt to once more eject the Nubians, who were attempting to encroach on the southern part of the country. This task was successfully completed by his successor, Ashurbanipal.

Ashurbanipal began his rule by once more defeating and chasing out the Nubian/Cushite king Taharqa, who had attempted to invade the southern part of Assyrian-controlled Egypt. Memphis was sacked. Ashurbanipal then puts down a series of rebellions by the native Egyptians themselves, installing Necho I as a vassal Pharaoh, who himself succeeded in heralding the 26th Dynasty of Egypt and kicking Assyrians eventually afterwards. However, in 664 BC, the new Nubian-Kushite king Tantamani once more attempted to invade Egypt. However he was savagely crushed, Thebes was sacked, and he fled to Nubia, bringing to an end, once and for all, Nubian-Kushite designs on Egypt.

Ashurbanipal built vast libraries and initiated a surge in the building of temples and palaces. After the crushing of the Babylonian revolt, Ashurbanipal appeared master of all he surveyed. To the east, Elam was devastated and prostrate before Assyria, the Manneans and the Iranian Persians and Medes were vassals. To the south, Babylonia was occupied, the Chaldeans, Arabs, Sutu and Nabateans subjugated, the Nubian empire destroyed, and Egypt paid tribute. To the north, the Scythians and Cimmerians had been vanquished and driven from Assyrian territory, Urartu (Armenia), Phrygia, Corduene and the Neo-Hittites were in vassalage, and Lydia pleading for Assyrian protection. To the west, Aramea (Syria), the Phoenicians, Israel, Judah, Samarra and Cyprus were subjugated, and the Hellenised inhabitants of Caria, Cilicia, Cappadocia and Commagene paid tribute to Assyria.

In 652 BC, just one year after his victory over Phraortes, his own brother Shamash-shum-ukin, the Assyrian king of Babylon who had spent seventeen years peacefully subject to his sibling, became infused with Babylonian nationalism, declaring that Babylon and not Nineveh should be the seat of empire. Shamash-shum-ukin raised a powerful coalition of vassal peoples resentful of being subject to Assyria, including- Babylonians, Chaldeans, Persians, Medes, Arameans, Suteans, Arabs, Elamites, Scythians, Cimmerians, Phoenicians, Israelites and even some disaffected Assyrians. War raged between the two brothers for five years, until in 648 BC, Babylon was sacked, and Shamash-shum-ukin was slain. Ashurbanipal then wrought savage revenge, Elam was utterly destroyed, the Aramean, Chaldean, Sutean tribes were brutally punished, Arabia was sacked and ravaged by the Assyrian army, and its rebellious sheikhs put to death. Cyrus I of Persia (grandfather of Cyrus the Great) was forced into submission, as a part of this defeated alliance.

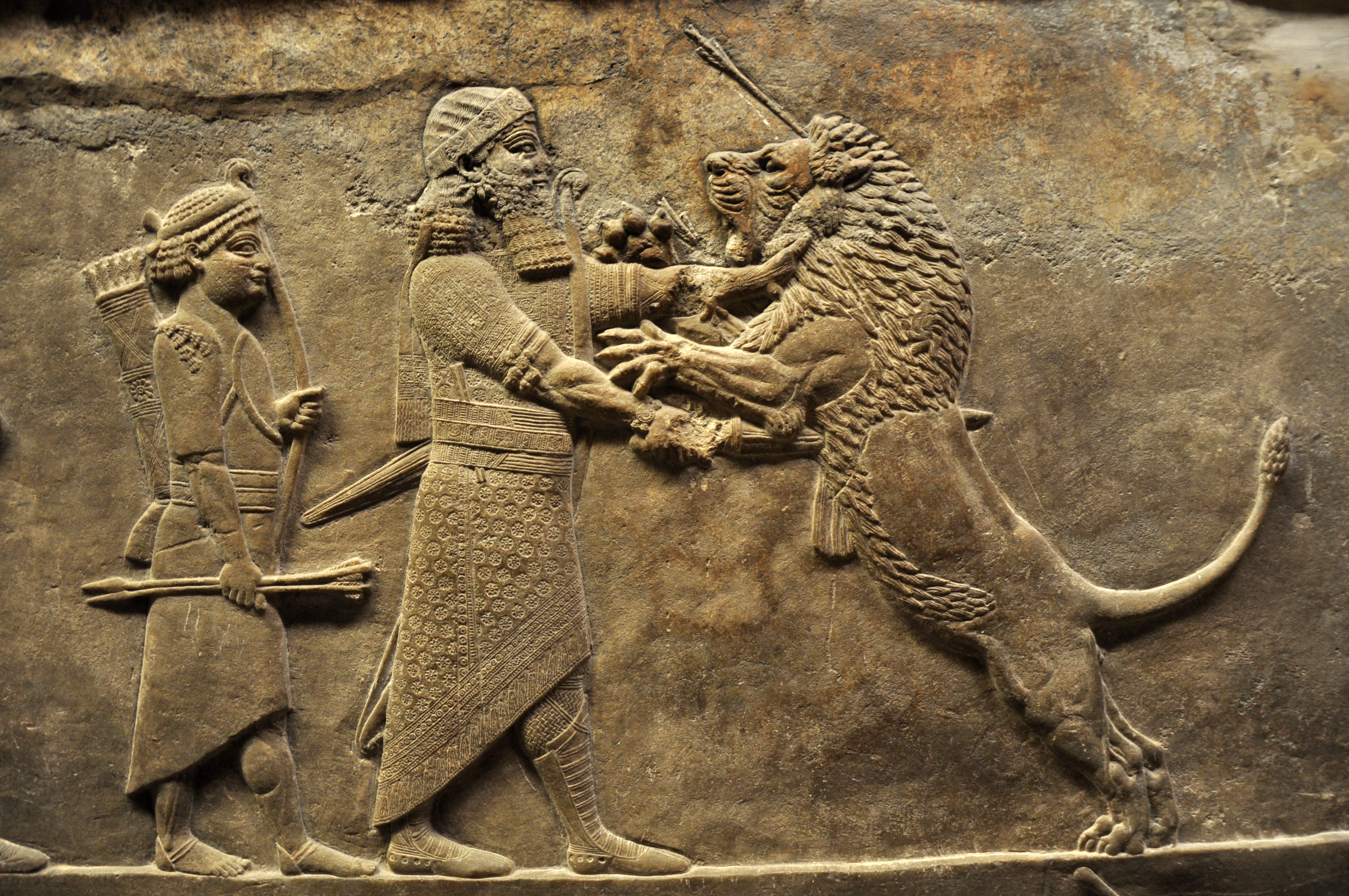
Relief showing a lion hunt, from the north palace of Nineveh, 645–635 BC

Esarhaddon (680–669 BC) expanded Assyria still further, campaigning deep into the Caucasus Mountains in the north, defeating king Rusas II and breaking Urartu completely in the process. Esarhaddon campaigned successfully subjugating the Scythian king Išpakaia, and the Cimmerian king Teušpa in Asia Minor, and in Ancient Iran, the Manneans, Gutians, Persians and Phraortes the king of the Medes were subjugated.

Phraortes, the king of the Medes and Persians, also rebelled against Assyria, and attempted to attack Assyria itself in 653 BC, however, he met with defeat at the hands of Ashurbanipal and was killed. His successor, Cyaxares, was in turn subjugated by Ashurbanipal's ally, the Scythian king Madyes, who imposed Scythian hegemony on the Medes. At around this time, Gyges king of Lydia in western Asia Minor, offered his submission to Ashurbanipal.

Mass alliances against Assyria were not a new phenomenon. During the Middle Assyrian Empire (1365–1020 BC), peoples such as the Hittites, Babylonians, Mitannians/Hurrians, Elamites, Phrygians, Kassites, Arameans, Gutians and Canaanites had formed various coalitions at different times in vain attempts to break Assyrian power. During the Neo-Assyrian Empire, in the reigns of Shalmaneser III in the 9th century BC, Sargon II in the 8th century BC, and Sennacherib and Ashurbanipal in the earlier part of the 7th century BC, combined attempts to break Assyrian dominance by alliances including at different times; Babylonians, Egyptians, Greeks, Persians, Elamites, Nubians, Medes, Chaldeans, Phoenicians, Canaanites, Lydians, Arameans, Suteans, Israelites, Judeans, Scythians, Cimmerians, Manneans, Urartians, Cilicians, Neo-Hittites and Arabs had all failed, Assyria being strong, well led and united, at the height of its power, and able to deal with any threat.

=== Downfall, 626–609 BC ===
By 627 BC, Nabopolassar, (a previously unknown Malka of the Chaldean tribes who had settled the far southeast of Mesopotamia circa 900 BC) took the lead of those who sought for independence. Sin-shar-ishkun amassed a large army to eject Nabopolassar from Babylon; however, yet another massive revolt broke out in Assyria proper, forcing the bulk of his army to turn back, where they promptly joined the rebels in Nineveh. Similarly, Nabopolassar was unable to gain control over all of Babylonia, and could not make any inroads into Assyria despite its weakened state, being repelled at every attempt. The next four years saw bitter fighting in the heart of Babylonia itself, as the Assyrians tried to wrest back control.

Meanwhile, the Median king Cyaxares the Great, a hitherto vassal of Assyria, had taken advantage of the upheavals in Assyria to free the Iranian peoples from Assyrian vassalage and unite the Iranian Medes, Persians and Parthians, together with the remnants of the pre-Iranian Elamites, Gutians, Kassites and Manneans, into a powerful Median-dominated force.

Ashur-etil-ilani came to the throne in 631 BC. He died in 627 BC, succeeded by his brother Sin-shar-ishkun (627–612 BC) in uncertain circumstances. Sinsharishkun was soon faced with the revolt of Sin-shumu-lishir, an Assyrian eunuch official who seized power in parts of Babylonia. Sin-shumu-lishir was defeated after three months of civil war, but remaining tensions led to wholescale revolution in Babylonia, and during the reign of Sin-shar-ishkun many Assyrian colonies to the west, east and north similarly took advantage and ceased to pay tribute to Assyria, most significantly the Medes, Persians, Scythians, Cimmerians, Babylonians, Chaldeans and Arameans.

In 615 BC, Cyaxares attacked the Assyrian Empire and his forces defeated the Assyrians at Arrapḫa. The next year, the Medes decisively defeated the Assyrians at the devastating battle of Assur. This assault greatly affected the Assyrian morale.

Ashur-uballit II (612- 609 BC) took the throne amid the street by street fighting in Nineveh and refused a request to bow in vassalage to Nabopolassar, Cyaxares and their allies. He managed to break out of Nineveh and successfully fight his way to the northern Assyrian city of Harran, and founded it as a new capital. Ashur-uballit II somehow managed to keep control of a now greatly reduced Assyria for three years or so, repelling attacks by his enemies. However, Harran too was eventually besieged and taken by the Medes, Babylonians and Scythians in 609 BC.

Certainly by 609 BC at the very latest, Assyria had been destroyed as an independent political entity, although it was to launch major rebellions against the Achaemenid Empire in 546 BC and 520 BC, and remained a geo-political region, ethnic entity and colonised province until the late 7th century AD, with small Assyrian states emerging in the region between the 2nd century BC and 4th century AD. The fate of Ashur-uballit II remains unknown; his Limmu Lists end after the fall of Harran.
