= List of Mesopotamian dynasties =

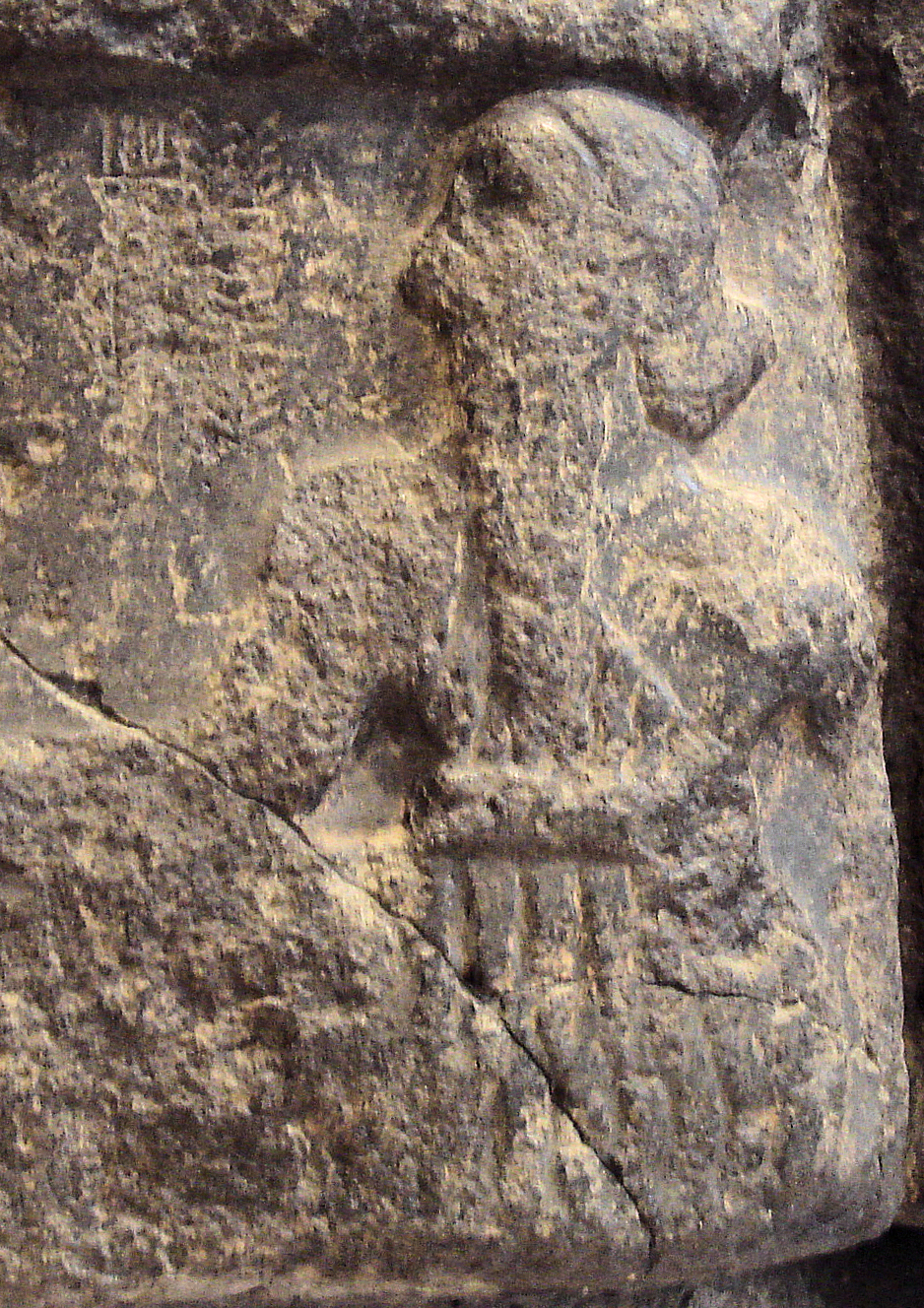
Sargon of Akkad

The history of Mesopotamia extends from the Lower Paleolithic period until the establishment of the Caliphate in the late 7th century AD, after which the region came to be known as Iraq. This list covers dynasties and monarchs of Mesopotamia up until the fall of the Neo-Babylonian Empire in 539 BC, after which native Mesopotamian monarchs never again ruled the region.

The earliest records of writing are known from the Uruk period (or "Protoliterate period") in the 4th millennium BC, with documentation of actual historical events, and the ancient history of the region, being known from the middle of the third millennium BC onwards, alongside cuneiform records written by early kings. This period, known as the Early Dynastic Period, is typically subdivided into three: 2900–2750 BC (ED I), 2750–2600 BC (ED II) and 2600–2350 BC (ED III), and was followed by Akkadian (~2350–2100 BC) and Neo-Sumerian (2112–2004 BC) periods, after which Mesopotamia was most often divided between Assyria in the north and Babylonia in the south. In 609 BC, after about a century of the kings of the Neo-Assyrian Empire ruling both Assyria and Babylonia, the Neo-Babylonian Empire destroyed Assyria and became the sole power in Mesopotamia. The conquest of Babylon by the Achaemenid Empire in 539 BC initiated centuries of Iranian rule (under the Achaemenid, Parthian and Sasanian empires), which was only briefly interrupted by the Hellenistic Argeads and Seleucids (331–141 BC) and the Roman Empire (AD 116–117).

This list follows the middle chronology, the most widely used chronology of Mesopotamian history.

== Early dynastic period (c. 2900–2350 BC) ==
Before the rise of the Akkadian Empire in the 24th century BC, Mesopotamia was fragmented into a number of city states. Whereas some surviving Mesopotamian documents, such as the Sumerian King List, describe this period as one where there was only one legitimate king at any one given time, and kingship was transferred from city to city sequentially, the historical reality was that there were often many political leaders at any one given time. The Sumerian King List is generally not regarded as historically reliable given the exaggerated reign lengths (some rulers are described as ruling for hundreds or even thousands of years) and the fact that out of the massive amount of pre-Akkadian rulers listed in the SKL, very few are actually attested in surviving evidence from the Early Dynastic period. It is considered most appropriate by modern scholars to rely solely on actual Early Dynastic sources for reconstructing historical events during the Early Dynastic period. As such, the table below only lists rulers whose existence is attested by other more contemporary sources.

Century	Kish	Uruk	Ur	Lagash	Umma	Adab
c. 2600s BC	Enmebaragesi; Aga of Kish Uhub; Mesilim; Meskiagnun; Elulu	Gilgamesh	A-Imdugud; Ur-Pabilsag; Meskalamdug; Akalamdug; Mesannepada; A'annepada; Meskiagnun; Elulu			
c. 2500s BC				En-hegal; Lugalshaengur; Ur-Nanshe; Akurgal	Pabilgagaltuku; Ush	
c. 2400s BC	Lugal-kinishe-dudu; Lugal-kisalsi	Lugal-kinishe-dudu; Lugal-kisalsi	Lugal-kinishe-dudu; Lugal-kisalsi	Eannatum; Enannatum I Entemena; Enannatum II; Enentarzi	Enakalle; Ur-Lumma; Il; Gishakidu; Edin; Meanedu; Ushurdu	Lugal-Anne-Mundu; Mug-si; E-iginimpa'e
c. 2300s BC	Lugal-zage-si	Enshakushanna; Lugal-zage-si	Lugalanda; Urukagina; Lugal-zage-si	Lugalanda; Urukagina; Lugal-zage-si	Ukush; Lugal-zage-si	Meskigal; Lugal-zage-si

== Akkadian and Neo-Sumerian periods (c. 2334–2004 BC) ==
Akkad			Gutium			Lagash			Uruk / Ur		
Name	Reign	Ref	Name	Reign	Ref	Name	Reign	Ref	Name	Reign	Ref
Sargonic dynasty											
Sargon	c. 2334–2279 BC										
Rimush	c. 2278–2270 BC										
Manishtushu	c. 2269–2255 BC					Second dynasty of Lagash					
Naram-Sin	c. 2254–2218 BC		Gutian dynasty			Lugal-ushumgal	c. 2230–2210 BC				
Shar-Kali-Sharri	c. 2217–2193 BC		Erridupizir	c. 2220–2202 BC		Puzer-Mama	around 2210 BC		Fourth dynasty of Uruk		
Shar-Kali-Sharri	c. 2217–2193 BC		Imta	c. 2202–2199 BC		Ur-Ningirsu I	around 2200 BC		Ur-nigin	around 2200 BC	
Shar-Kali-Sharri	c. 2217–2193 BC		Imta	c. 2202–2199 BC		Pirig-me	around 2200 BC		Ur-gigir	around 2200 BC	
Shar-Kali-Sharri	c. 2217–2193 BC		Inkishush	c. 2199–2195 BC		Pirig-me	around 2200 BC		Ur-gigir	around 2200 BC	
Igigi (non-dynastic)	c. 2193 BC		Sarlagab	c. 2195–2192 BC		Pirig-me	around 2200 BC		Kuda	uncertain	
Imi (non-dynastic)	c. 2192 BC		Shulme	c. 2192–2186 BC		Lu-Baba	uncertain		Puzur-ili	uncertain	
Nanum (non-dynastic)	c. 2191 BC		Shulme	c. 2192–2186 BC		Lu-Baba	uncertain		Puzur-ili	uncertain	
Ilulu (non-dynastic)	c. 2190 BC		Shulme	c. 2192–2186 BC		Lugula	uncertain		Ur-Utu	uncertain	
Dudu	c. 2189–2169 BC		Elulmesh	c. 2186–2180 BC		Lugula	uncertain				
Dudu	c. 2189–2169 BC		Inimabakesh	c. 2180–2175 BC		Lugula	uncertain				
Dudu	c. 2189–2169 BC		Igeshaush	c. 2175–2169 BC		Kaku	uncertain				
Shu-turul	c. 2168–2154 BC		Yarlagab	c. 2169–2154 BC		Kaku	uncertain				
Akkad defeated by the Gutians			Yarlagab	c. 2169–2154 BC		Kaku	uncertain				
Akkad defeated by the Gutians			Ibate	c. 2154–2151 BC		Ur-Baba	c. 2157–2144 BC				
Akkad defeated by the Gutians			Yarla	c. 2151–2148 BC		Ur-Baba	c. 2157–2144 BC				
Akkad defeated by the Gutians			Kurum	c. 2148–2147 BC		Ur-Baba	c. 2157–2144 BC				
Akkad defeated by the Gutians			Apilkin	c. 2147–2144 BC		Ur-Baba	c. 2157–2144 BC				
Akkad defeated by the Gutians			La-erabum	c. 2144–2142 BC		Gudea	c. 2144–2124 BC				
Akkad defeated by the Gutians			Irarum	c. 2142–2140 BC		Gudea	c. 2144–2124 BC				
Akkad defeated by the Gutians			Ibranum	c. 2140–2139 BC		Gudea	c. 2144–2124 BC				
Akkad defeated by the Gutians			Hablum	c. 2139–2137 BC		Gudea	c. 2144–2124 BC				
Akkad defeated by the Gutians			Puzur-Suen	c. 2137–2130 BC		Gudea	c. 2144–2124 BC				
Akkad defeated by the Gutians			Yarlaganda	c. 2130–2123 BC		Gudea	c. 2144–2124 BC				
Akkad defeated by the Gutians			Si'um	c. 2123–2116 BC		Ur-Ningirsu II	c. 2124–2119 BC		Fifth dynasty of Uruk		
Akkad defeated by the Gutians			Tirigan	c. 2116 BC		Ur-gar	c. 2117–2113 BC		Utu-hengal	c. 2119–2113 BC	
Gutians defeated by Utu-Hengal of Uruk						Ur-gar	c. 2117–2113 BC		Third dynasty of Ur		
Gutians defeated by Utu-Hengal of Uruk						Nam-mahani	c. 2113–2110 BC		Ur-Nammu	c. 2112–2095 BC	
Gutians defeated by Utu-Hengal of Uruk						Lagash defeated by Ur-Nammu of Ur			Shulgi	c. 2094–2047 BC	
Gutians defeated by Utu-Hengal of Uruk						Lagash defeated by Ur-Nammu of Ur			Amar-Sin	c. 2046–2038 BC	
Gutians defeated by Utu-Hengal of Uruk						Lagash defeated by Ur-Nammu of Ur			Shu-Sin	c. 2037–2029 BC	
Gutians defeated by Utu-Hengal of Uruk						Lagash defeated by Ur-Nammu of Ur			Ibbi-Sin	c. 2028–2004 BC	

== Isin–Larsa and rise of Babylon (c. 2025–1750 BC) ==
Southern Mesopotamia												Northern Mesopotamia					
Isin			Larsa			Babylon			Uruk			Eshnunna			Assyria		
Name	Reign	Ref	Name	Reign	Ref	Name	Reign	Ref	Name	Reign	Ref	Name	Reign	Ref	Name	Reign	Ref
First dynasty of Isin			Dynasty of Larsa									Dynasty of Eshnunna			Puzur-Ashur dynasty		
Ishbi-Erra	c. 2017–1985 BC		Naplanum	c. 2025–2005 BC								Ituria	uncertain		Puzur-Ashur I (Note: Considered the first king of the Old Assyrian period)	uncertain	
Ishbi-Erra	c. 2017–1985 BC		Emisum	c. 2004–1977 BC								Ilushuilia	uncertain		Shalim-ahum	uncertain	
Shu-Ilishu	c. 1984–1975 BC		Emisum	c. 2004–1977 BC								Nurakhum	uncertain		Ilu-shuma	uncertain	
Iddin-Dagan	c. 1974–1954 BC		Samium	c. 1976–1942 BC								Kirikiri	uncertain		Erishum I	c. 1974–1935 BC	
Ishme-Dagan	c. 1953–1935 BC		Zabaia	c. 1941–1933 BC								Bilalama	uncertain		Erishum I	c. 1974–1935 BC	
Lipit-Eshtar	c. 1934–1924 BC		Gungunum	c. 1932–1906 BC								Azuzum	uncertain		Ikunum	c. 1934–1921 BC	
Ur-Ninurta	c. 1923–1896 BC		Abisare	c. 1905–1895 BC		Amorite dynasty (Dynasty I)						Ipiq-Adad I	uncertain		Sargon I	c. 1920–1881 BC	
Bur-Suen	c. 1895–1874 BC		Sumuel	c. 1894–1866 BC		Sumu-abum	c. 1894–1881 BC					Shiqlanum	uncertain		Sargon I	c. 1920–1881 BC	
Lipit-Enlil	c. 1873–1869 BC		Sumuel	c. 1894–1866 BC		Sumu-abum	c. 1894–1881 BC					Abdi-Erah	uncertain		Puzur-Ashur II	c. 1880–1873 BC	
Erra-imitti	c. 1868–1861 BC		Nur-Adad	c. 1865–1850 BC		Sumu-la-El	c. 1880–1845 BC		Sixth dynasty of Uruk			Belakum	uncertain		Puzur-Ashur II	c. 1880–1873 BC	
Enlil-bani	c. 1860–1837 BC		Sin-Iddinam	c. 1849–1843 BC		Sumu-la-El	c. 1880–1845 BC		Sin-kashid	uncertain		Warassa	uncertain		Naram-Sin	c. 1872–1829 BC	
Zambiya	c. 1836–1834 BC		Sin-Eribam	c. 1842–1841 BC		Sabium	c. 1844–1831 BC		Sin-eribam	uncertain		Ibal-pi-El I	uncertain		Naram-Sin	c. 1872–1829 BC	
Iter-pisha	c. 1833–1831 BC		Sin-Iqisham	c. 1840–1836 BC		Sabium	c. 1844–1831 BC		Sin-gamil	uncertain		Ipiq-Adad II	uncertain		Naram-Sin	c. 1872–1829 BC	
Iter-pisha	c. 1833–1831 BC		Silli-Adad	c. 1835 BC		Sabium	c. 1844–1831 BC		An-am	uncertain		Naram-Sin	uncertain		Naram-Sin	c. 1872–1829 BC	
Ur-du-kuga	c. 1830–1828 BC		Warad-Sin	c. 1834–1823 BC		Sabium	c. 1844–1831 BC		Irdanene	uncertain		Dadusha	uncertain		Naram-Sin	c. 1872–1829 BC	
Suen-magir	c. 1827–1817 BC		Rim-Sin I (Note: Rim-Sin I was the last independent king of Larsa, though the city rebelled against Hammurabi's successor Samsu-iluna in 1737, with Rim-Sîn II briefly ruling there as king.)	c. 1822–1763 BC		Apil-Sin	c. 1830–1813 BC		Rîm-Anum	uncertain		Ibal-pi-el II	c. 1762 BC		Erishum II	c. 1828–1809 BC	
Suen-magir	c. 1827–1817 BC		Rim-Sin I	c. 1822–1763 BC		Apil-Sin	c. 1830–1813 BC		Rîm-Anum	uncertain		Ibal-pi-el II	c. 1762 BC		Shamshi-Adad dynasty		
Damiq-ilishu	c. 1816–1794 BC		Rim-Sin I	c. 1822–1763 BC		Sin-Muballit	c. 1812–1793 BC		Nabi-ilishu	c. 1802 BC		Ibal-pi-el II	c. 1762 BC		Shamshi-Adad I	c. 1808–1776 BC	
Isin defeated by Rim-Sin I of Larsa			Rim-Sin I	c. 1822–1763 BC		Sin-Muballit	c. 1812–1793 BC								Shamshi-Adad I	c. 1808–1776 BC	
Isin defeated by Rim-Sin I of Larsa			Rim-Sin I	c. 1822–1763 BC		Hammurabi	c. 1792–1750 BC		Uruk defeated by Hammurabi of Babylon			Eshnunna defeated by Siwepalarhuhpak of Elam			Ishme-Dagan I	c. 1775–1735 BC	
Larsa defeated by Hammurabi of Babylon						Hammurabi	c. 1792–1750 BC		Uruk defeated by Hammurabi of Babylon			Eshnunna defeated by Siwepalarhuhpak of Elam			Ishme-Dagan I	c. 1775–1735 BC	

== Fragmentation of Babylonia (c. 1749–1475 BC) ==
Southern Mesopotamia (Babylonia)									Northern Mesopotamia		
Babylon			Kassites			Sealand			Assyria		
Name	Reign	Ref	Name	Reign	Ref	Name	Reign	Ref	Name	Reign	Ref
Amorite dynasty (Dynasty I; continued)			Kassite dynasty (Dynasty III)			First Sealand dynasty (Dynasty II)			Shamshi-Adad dynasty (continued)		
Samsu-iluna	c. 1749–1712 BC		Gandash	c. 1729–1704 BC		Ilum-ma-ili	c. 1725–? BC		Mut-Ashkur	uncertain	
Samsu-iluna	c. 1749–1712 BC		Gandash	c. 1729–1704 BC		Ilum-ma-ili	c. 1725–? BC		Rimush	uncertain	
Abi-Eshuh	c. 1711–1684 BC		Agum I	c. 1703–1682 BC		Itti-ili-nibi	uncertain		Asinum	uncertain	
Abi-Eshuh	c. 1711–1684 BC		Agum I	c. 1703–1682 BC		Itti-ili-nibi	uncertain		Seven usurpers		
Abi-Eshuh	c. 1711–1684 BC		Agum I	c. 1703–1682 BC		Itti-ili-nibi	uncertain		Ashur-dugul	uncertain	
Abi-Eshuh	c. 1711–1684 BC		Agum I	c. 1703–1682 BC		Itti-ili-nibi	uncertain		Ashur-apla-idi	uncertain	
Abi-Eshuh	c. 1711–1684 BC		Agum I	c. 1703–1682 BC		Itti-ili-nibi	uncertain		Nasir-Sin	uncertain	
Abi-Eshuh	c. 1711–1684 BC		Agum I	c. 1703–1682 BC		Itti-ili-nibi	uncertain		Sin-namir	uncertain	
Abi-Eshuh	c. 1711–1684 BC		Agum I	c. 1703–1682 BC		Itti-ili-nibi	uncertain		Ipqi-Ishtar	uncertain	
Abi-Eshuh	c. 1711–1684 BC		Agum I	c. 1703–1682 BC		Itti-ili-nibi	uncertain		Adad-salulu	uncertain	
Abi-Eshuh	c. 1711–1684 BC		Agum I	c. 1703–1682 BC		Itti-ili-nibi	uncertain		Adasi	uncertain	
Abi-Eshuh	c. 1711–1684 BC		Agum I	c. 1703–1682 BC		Itti-ili-nibi	uncertain		Adaside dynasty		
Abi-Eshuh	c. 1711–1684 BC		Agum I	c. 1703–1682 BC		Damqi-ilishu	uncertain		Bel-bani	c. 1700–1691 BC	
Abi-Eshuh	c. 1711–1684 BC		Kashtiliash I	c. 1681–1660 BC		Damqi-ilishu	uncertain		Libaya	c. 1691–1674 BC	
Ammi-Ditana	c. 1683–1647 BC		Abi-Rattash	uncertain		Ishkibal	uncertain		Sharma-Adad I	c. 1673–1662 BC	
Ammi-Ditana	c. 1683–1647 BC		Abi-Rattash	uncertain		Ishkibal	uncertain		Iptar-Sin	c. 1661–1650 BC	
Ammi-Saduqa	c. 1646–1626 BC		Abi-Rattash	uncertain		Shushushi	uncertain		Bazaya	c. 1649–1622 BC	
Samsu-Ditana	c. 1625–1595 BC		Kashtiliash II	uncertain		Gulkishar	uncertain		Lullaya	c. 1621–1616 BC	
Samsu-Ditana	c. 1625–1595 BC		Kashtiliash II	uncertain		Gulkishar	uncertain		Shu-Ninua	c. 1615–1602 BC	
Samsu-Ditana	c. 1625–1595 BC		Kashtiliash II	uncertain		Gulkishar	uncertain		Sharma-Adad II	c. 1601–1598 BC	
Babylon destroyed by the Hittites			Urzigurumash	uncertain		Peshgaldaramesh	c. 1599–1549 BC		Erishum III	c. 1598–1586 BC	
Babylon destroyed by the Hittites			Agum II	uncertain		Peshgaldaramesh	c. 1599–1549 BC		Shamshi-Adad II	c. 1585–1580 BC	
Babylon destroyed by the Hittites			Harba-Shipak	uncertain		Peshgaldaramesh	c. 1599–1549 BC		Ishme-Dagan II	c. 1580–1564 BC	
Kassite dynasty (Dynasty III)			Shipta'ulzi	uncertain		Peshgaldaramesh	c. 1599–1549 BC		Shamshi-Adad III	c. 1564–1548 BC	
Burnaburiash I (Note: The earliest Kassite ruler confidently attested as ruling Babylon itself.)	c. 1530–1500 BC		Burnaburiash I	c. 1530–1500 BC		Ayadaragalama	c. 1548–1520 BC		Ashur-nirari I	c. 1548–1522 BC	
Burnaburiash I	c. 1530–1500 BC		Burnaburiash I	c. 1530–1500 BC		Akurduana	c. 1519–1493 BC		Puzur-Ashur III	c. 1522–1498 BC	
Ulamburiash	around 1475 BC		Ulamburiash	around 1475 BC		Melamkurkurra	c. 1492–1485 BC		Enlil-nasir I	c. 1498–1485 BC	
Ulamburiash	around 1475 BC		Ulamburiash	around 1475 BC		Ea-gamil	c. 1484–1475 BC		Nur-ili	c. 1485–1473 BC	

== Babylonia and Assyria (c. 1475–539 BC) ==
Babylonia			Assyria		
Name	Reign	Ref	Name	Reign	Ref
Kassite dynasty (Dynasty III; continued)			Adaside dynasty (continued)		
Ulamburiash (Note: Reunified Babylonia through defeating Ea-gamil, the last king of the First Sealand dynasty)	around 1475 BC		Ashur-shaduni	c. 1473 BC	
Kashtiliash III	uncertain		Ashur-rabi I	c. 1473–1453 BC	
Kashtiliash III	uncertain		Ashur-nadin-ahhe I	c. 1453–1431 BC	
Agum III	uncertain		Enlil-nasir II	c. 1430–1425 BC	
Agum III	uncertain		Ashur-nirari II	c. 1424–1418 BC	
Karaindash	around 1415 BC		Ashur-bel-nisheshu	c. 1417–1409 BC	
Karaindash	around 1415 BC		Ashur-rim-nisheshu	c. 1408–1401 BC	
Kadashman-Harbe I	around 1400 BC		Ashur-nadin-ahhe II	c. 1400–1391 BC	
Kadashman-Harbe I	around 1400 BC		Eriba-Adad I	c. 1390–1364 BC	
Kurigalzu I	uncertain		Ashur-uballit I (Note: Considered the first king of the Middle Assyrian period)	c. 1363–1328 BC	
Kadashman-Enlil I	c. 1374–1360 BC		Ashur-uballit I	c. 1363–1328 BC	
Burnaburiash II	c. 1359–1333 BC		Ashur-uballit I	c. 1363–1328 BC	
Kara-hardash	c. 1333 BC		Enlil-nirari	c. 1327–1318 BC	
Nazi-Bugash	c. 1333 BC		Enlil-nirari	c. 1327–1318 BC	
Kurigalzu II	c. 1332–1308 BC		Arik-den-ili	c. 1317–1306 BC	
Nazi-Maruttash	c. 1307–1282 BC		Adad-nirari I	c. 1305–1274 BC	
Kadashman-Turgu	c. 1281–1264 BC		Shalmaneser I	c. 1273–1244 BC	
Kadashman-Enlil II	c. 1263–1255 BC		Shalmaneser I	c. 1273–1244 BC	
Kudur-Enlil	c. 1254–1246 BC		Shalmaneser I	c. 1273–1244 BC	
Shagarakti-Shuriash	c. 1245–1233 BC		Tukulti-Ninurta I	c. 1243–1207 BC	
Kashtiliash IV	c. 1232–1225 BC		Tukulti-Ninurta I	c. 1243–1207 BC	
Enlil-nadin-shumi	c. 1224 BC		Tukulti-Ninurta I	c. 1243–1207 BC	
Kadashman-Harbe II	c. 1223 BC		Tukulti-Ninurta I	c. 1243–1207 BC	
Adad-shuma-iddina	c. 1222–1217 BC		Tukulti-Ninurta I	c. 1243–1207 BC	
Adad-shuma-usur	c. 1216–1187 BC		Ashur-nadin-apli	c. 1206–1203 BC	
Adad-shuma-usur	c. 1216–1187 BC		Ashur-nirari III	c. 1202–1197 BC	
Adad-shuma-usur	c. 1216–1187 BC		Enlil-kudurri-usur	c. 1196–1192 BC	
Meli-Shipak	c. 1186–1172 BC		Ninurta-apal-Ekur	c. 1191–1179 BC	
Marduk-apla-iddina I	c. 1171–1159 BC		Ashur-dan I	c. 1178–1133 BC	
Zababa-shuma-iddin	c. 1158 BC		Ashur-dan I	c. 1178–1133 BC	
Enlil-nadin-ahi	c. 1157–1155 BC		Ashur-dan I	c. 1178–1133 BC	
Second dynasty of Isin (Dynasty IV)			Ashur-dan I	c. 1178–1133 BC	
Marduk-kabit-ahheshu	c. 1153–1136 BC		Ashur-dan I	c. 1178–1133 BC	
Itti-Marduk-balatu	c. 1135–1128 BC		Ninurta-tukulti-Ashur	c. 1132 BC	
Itti-Marduk-balatu	c. 1135–1128 BC		Mutakkil-nusku	c. 1132 BC	
Ninurta-nadin-shumi	c. 1127–1122 BC		Ashur-resh-ishi I	1132–1115 BC	
Nebuchadnezzar I	c. 1121–1100 BC		Tiglath-Pileser I	1114–1076 BC	
Enlil-nadin-apli	c. 1099–1096 BC		Tiglath-Pileser I	1114–1076 BC	
Marduk-nadin-ahhe	c. 1095–1078 BC		Tiglath-Pileser I	1114–1076 BC	
Marduk-shapik-zeri	c. 1077–1065 BC		Asharid-apal-Ekur	1075–1074 BC	
Adad-apla-iddina	c. 1064–1043 BC		Ashur-bel-kala	1073–1056 BC	
Adad-apla-iddina	c. 1064–1043 BC		Eriba-Adad II	1055–1054 BC	
Adad-apla-iddina	c. 1064–1043 BC		Shamshi-Adad IV	1053–1050 BC	
Marduk-ahhe-eriba	c. 1042 BC		Ashurnasirpal I	1049–1031 BC	
Marduk-zer-X	c. 1041–1030 BC		Ashurnasirpal I	1049–1031 BC	
Nabu-shum-libur	c. 1029–1022 BC		Shalmaneser II	1030–1019 BC	
Second Sealand dynasty (Dynasty V)			Ashur-nirari IV	1018–1013 BC	
Simbar-shipak	c. 1021–1004 BC		Ashur-nirari IV	1018–1013 BC	
Ea-mukin-zeri	c. 1004 BC		Ashur-rabi II	1012–972 BC	
Kashshu-nadin-ahi	c. 1003–1001 BC		Ashur-rabi II	1012–972 BC	
Bazi dynasty (Dynasty VI)			Ashur-rabi II	1012–972 BC	
Eulmash-shakin-shumi	c. 1000–984 BC		Ashur-rabi II	1012–972 BC	
Ninurta-kudurri-usur I	c. 983–981 BC		Ashur-rabi II	1012–972 BC	
Shirikti-shuqamuna	c. 981 BC		Ashur-rabi II	1012–972 BC	
Elamite dynasty (Dynasty VII)			Ashur-rabi II	1012–972 BC	
Mar-biti-apla-usur	c. 980–975 BC		Ashur-rabi II	1012–972 BC	
Dynasty of E (Dynasty VIII)			Ashur-rabi II	1012–972 BC	
Nabu-mukin-apli	c. 974–939 BC		Ashur-resh-ishi II	971–967 BC	
Nabu-mukin-apli	c. 974–939 BC		Tiglath-Pileser II	967–935 BC	
Ninurta-kudurri-usur II	c. 939 BC		Ashur-dan II	935–912 BC	
Mar-biti-ahhe-iddina	c. 938–? BC		Ashur-dan II	935–912 BC	
Shamash-mudammiq	c. ?–901 BC		Ashur-dan II	935–912 BC	
Nabu-shuma-ukin I	c. 900–887 BC		Adad-nirari II (Note: Considered the first king of the Neo-Assyrian Empire)	912–891 BC	
Nabu-apla-iddina	c. 886–853 BC		Tukulti-Ninurta II	891–884 BC	
Marduk-zakir-shumi I	c. 852–825 BC		Ashurnasirpal II	884–859 BC	
Marduk-zakir-shumi I	c. 852–825 BC		Shalmaneser III	859–824 BC	
Marduk-balassu-iqbi	c. 824–813 BC		Shamshi-Adad V	824–811 BC	
Baba-aha-iddina	c. 813–812 BC		Adad-nirari III	811–783 BC	
Ninurta-apla-X	uncertain		Adad-nirari III	811–783 BC	
Marduk-bel-zeri	uncertain		Adad-nirari III	811–783 BC	
Marduk-apla-usur	uncertain		Shalmaneser IV	783–773 BC	
Eriba-Marduk	c. 769–760 BC		Ashur-dan III	773–755 BC	
Nabu-shuma-ishkun	c. 760–748 BC		Ashur-nirari V	755–745 BC	
Nabonassar	748–734 BC		Tiglath-Pileser III	745–727 BC	
Nabu-nadin-zeri	734–732 BC		Tiglath-Pileser III	745–727 BC	
Nabu-shuma-ukin II	732 BC		Tiglath-Pileser III	745–727 BC	
Nabu-mukin-zeri (Note: Sometimes assigned to his own dynasty, the "Shapi dynasty") (non-dynastic)	732–729 BC		Tiglath-Pileser III	745–727 BC	
Adaside dynasty (also in Assyria)			Tiglath-Pileser III	745–727 BC	
Tiglath-Pileser III	729–727 BC		Tiglath-Pileser III	745–727 BC	
Shalmaneser V	727–722 BC		Shalmaneser V	727–722 BC	
Sargonid dynasty
Marduk-apla-iddina II (Note: Sometimes assigned to his own dynasty, the "Third Sealand dynasty") (non-dynastic)	722–710 BC		Sargon II	722–705 BC	
Sargon II	710–705 BC		Sargon II	722–705 BC	
Sennacherib	705–703 BC		Sennacherib	705–681 BC	
Marduk-zakir-shumi II (non-dynastic)	703 BC		Sennacherib	705–681 BC	
Marduk-apla-iddina II (non-dynastic)	703 BC		Sennacherib	705–681 BC	
Bel-ibni (Note: Assigned to the earlier Dynasty of E in king-lists) (vassal king)	703–700 BC		Sennacherib	705–681 BC	
Ashur-nadin-shumi	700–694 BC		Sennacherib	705–681 BC	
Nergal-ushezib (non-dynastic)	694–693 BC		Sennacherib	705–681 BC	
Mushezib-Marduk (non-dynastic)	693–689 BC		Sennacherib	705–681 BC	
Sennacherib	689–681 BC		Sennacherib	705–681 BC	
Esarhaddon	681–669 BC		Esarhaddon	681–669 BC	
Shamash-shum-ukin	668–648 BC		Ashurbanipal	669–631 BC	
Kandalanu (vassal king)	647–627 BC		Ashur-etil-ilani	631–627 BC	
Sinsharishkun	627–626 BC		Sinsharishkun	627–612 BC	
Sin-shumu-lishir (usurper)	626 BC		Sinsharishkun	627–612 BC	
Chaldean dynasty (Dynasty X)			Sinsharishkun	627–612 BC	
Nabopolassar	626–605 BC		Ashur-uballit II	612–609 BC	
Nebuchadnezzar II	605–562 BC		Assyria defeated by Nabopolassar of Babylon		
Amel-Marduk	562–560 BC		Assyria defeated by Nabopolassar of Babylon		
Neriglissar (non-dynastic)	560–556 BC		Assyria defeated by Nabopolassar of Babylon		
Labashi-Marduk (non-dynastic)	556 BC		Assyria defeated by Nabopolassar of Babylon		
Nabonidus (non-dynastic)	556–539 BC		Assyria defeated by Nabopolassar of Babylon		

== See also ==
- Chronology of the ancient Near East
- List of kings of Akkad
- List of Assyrian kings
- List of kings of Babylon
- Sumerian King List
- List of monarchs of Iran
- List of Elamite kings
- List of pharaohs
- List of Hittite kings
- Mitanni
- History of institutions in Mesopotamia
