= Rimush of Assyria =

Assyrian king

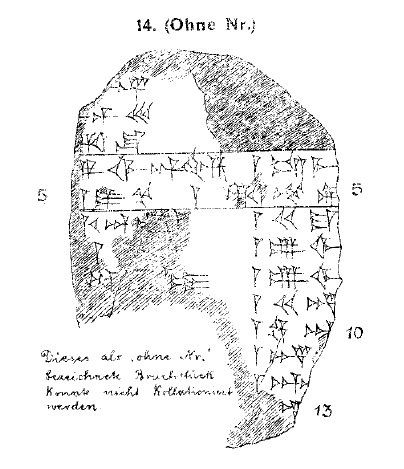
Schroeder’s line art for the Assyrian Kinglist fragment known as KAV 14 (Note: Assyrian Kinglist fragment VAT 9812 = KAV 14: 5.) after his publication

Rimush or Rīmu[š], inscribed ^{m}ri-mu-u[š] on the only variant List of Assyrian kings on which he appears (fl. c. 1750 BC), was a possible ruler of Assyria or perhaps just the part centered on Ekallatum, a successor to and probably a descendant of Shamshi-Adad I, although the exact relationship is uncertain. If he was a ruler, he would have reigned sometime during the middle of the 18th century BC.

== Biography ==
Neither the Khorsabad nor SDAS copies of the Assyrian Kinglist, the only lists whose earliest part is still intact, include any successors of Shamshi-Adad I’s son and heir Ishme-Dagan I, who had been ousted by Hammurabi. The fragmentary list known as KAV 14 (pictured) gives the sequence Shamshi-Adad, Ishme-[Dagān], [Mu]t-Ashkur, then Rimu-˹x˺ before skipping to the 54th ruler, Shu-Ninua. There may be sufficient space to insert a successor to Rimudh (Asinum?) on the end of the line his name is given. As the group falls within a section separated by lines from the rest of the list and the first three are known from other sources (Note: From correspondence at Mari.) to be related as father, son and grandson, it is assumed that the four or five names form a dynasty.

Rimush would appear to be named for the son of the king Sargon of Akkad, perhaps reflecting the extent to which Shamshi-Adad and his successors identified with this ancient prestigious dynasty, although the earlier Rimush was apparently assassinated by his own courtiers “with their seals,” according to a liver-omen of the monumental Bārûtu series, a somewhat ignominious end. The events resulting in the demise of the dynasty are witnessed in only one inscription, that of Puzur-Sin, who boasted of overthrowing the son of Asīnûm, descendant of Šamši-Adad, whose name has not been preserved. This may have been Rīmuš, or if Asīnû followed him, perhaps his grandson. The result was apparently turmoil as a rapid succession of seven usurpers took power, each reigning briefly before being overthrown.
