= Lullaya =

- Issi'ak Assur

King of Assur
- Reign: c. 1621–1616 BC
- Predecessor: Bazaya
- Successor: Shu-Ninua
- Father: "a nobody"

Lullaia or Lullaya, inscribed in cuneiform phonetically ^{m}lu-ul-la-a-a, (Note: Khorsabad List, IM 60017 (excavation nos.: DS 828, DS 32-54), ii 22.) (Note: SDAS List, IM 60484, ii 19.) a hypocoristic name, was the 53rd king of Assyria to be added to the Assyrian King List. He was a “son of a nobody,” i.e. unrelated to a previous monarch, and reigned six years, from c. 1621–1616 BC, during a quiet and uneventful period in Assyrian history. Reade speculates that he may be identified with the earlier king, Aššūr-dugul, on the basis of their similar lengths of reign and lack of royal parentage.

== Chronological position ==
He was the last in the sequence of kings omitted from the dissident Assyrian Kinglist known as KAV 14, (Note: Assyrian Kinglist fragment VAT 9812 = KAV 14: 5.) which otherwise provides the only extant sequence of Shamshi-Adad I’s later successors, Mut-Ashkur and Rimush. The Synchronistic Kinglist (Note: Synchronistic Kinglist, Ass 14616c (KAV 216), I 7’.) gives his Babylonian counterpart as Ayadaragalama of the Sealand Dynasty. There are no extant inscriptions from Lullaia's or his predecessor's reigns in marked contrast with their Sealand contemporaries.

He was succeeded by Shu-Ninua, the son of his predecessor, Bazaya, for whom he may have acted as regent until reaching his majority as there is no tradition that Lullaia was a usurper.

== Inscriptions ==
Preceded by Bazaya	King of Assyria; 1621–1616 BC	Succeeded by Shu-Ninua
