= Bazaya =

- Issi'ak Assur

King of Assur
- Reign: c. 1649–1622 BC
- Predecessor: Iptar-Sin
- Successor: Lullaya
- Issue: Shu-Ninua
- Father: Bel-bani

Bazaya, Bāzāia or Bāzāiu, inscribed ^{m}ba-za-a-a and of uncertain meaning, was the ruler of Assyria c. 1649 to 1622 BC, the 52nd listed on the Assyrian King List, succeeding Iptar-Sin, to whom he was supposedly a great-uncle. He reigned for twenty-eight years and has left no known inscriptions.

== Family ==
The Assyrian king lists (Note: Khorsabad List, IM 60017 (excavation nos.: DS 828, DS 32-54), ii 20.) (Note: SDAS List, IM 60484, ii 18.) (Note: Nassouhi List, Istanbul A. 116 (Assur 8836), ii 15.) give Bazaya's five predecessors as father-son successors, although all reigned during a fifty-two period, stretching genealogical credibility. All three extant copies give his father as Bel-bani, the second in the sequence, whose reign had ended forty-one years earlier and who had been the great-grandfather of his immediate predecessor. The literal reading of the list was challenged by Landsberger who suggested that the three preceding kings, Libaya, Sharma-Adad I and Iptar-Sin may have been Bel-bani's brothers.

The Synchronistic Kinglist (Note: Synchronistic Kinglist, Ass 14616c (KAV 216), I 6’.) gives his Babylonian counterpart as Peshgaldaramesh of the Sealand Dynasty. He was succeeded by Lullaya, a usurper, whose brief reign was followed by that of Bāzāiu's own son, Shu-Ninua.

== Inscriptions ==
Preceded by Iptar-Sin	King of Assyria; 1649–1622 BC	Succeeded by Lullaya
