= Son of a nobody =

Assyrian term to indicate a king of disreputable origins

In ancient Assyrian sources, the phrase "son of a nobody" (Akkadian: mār lā mamman) is used to indicate a king of disreputable origins. Usurpers, lowborns, immoral rulers, and foreign kings were all commonly referred to as a “son of a nobody”.

The earliest instance of the phrase occurs in a fragmentary annal of Naram-Sin, who reigned in the 23rd century BCE, where it is used to deride the Gutian king Gula-AN. Ashur-uballit I, who established the Middle Assyrian Empire in the 14th century BCE, used the term to describe a Kassite usurper installed by the army following the murder of the previous ruler, Kara-ḫardaš. The term found occasional usage in subsequent centuries, but became regularly used in royal documents beginning in the 9th century BCE. Dynastic lists from around this time began calling previous usurper kings “sons of a nobody” to indicate their non-royal ancestry, which consequently made them unqualified to govern according to the patrilineal principle of legitimacy relied upon by later monarchs. Beginning with Tiglath-Pileser III, royal annals begin employing the phrase “son of a nobody” much more frequently. Usage of the term was not universally negative, however, as Tiglath-Pileser notes the king of Tabal, whom he personally installed, behaves in the way prescribed by Assyrian state ideology in spite of his status as the “son of a nobody”.

In the time of the Neo-Babylonian Empire, the king Nabopolassar strikingly referred to himself as a “son of a nobody” in his own inscriptions, something that no previous Neo-Babylonian usurper king had done.

== Notable “sons of a nobody” ==
- Gula-AN (reigned 23rd century BCE)
- Aššūr-dugul (r. 18th century BCE)
- Adasi (r. 18th century BCE)
- Lullaya (r. 17th century BCE)
- Nazi-Bugaš/Šuzigaš (r. 14th century BCE)
- Hazael (r. 9th–8th century BCE)
- Rukibtu (possibly, r. 8th century BCE)
- Mushezib-Marduk (r. 7th century BCE)
- Nabopolassar (r. 7th century BCE)
