= Iptar-Sin =

King of Assyria
- Reign: c. 1662 – c. 1650 BC
- Predecessor: Sharma-Adad I
- Successor: Bazaya
- Died: c. 1650 BC
- Issue: Bazaya

Iptar-Sin or IB.TAR.Sîn (Note: ^{m}IB.TAR-^{d}30.) (reading uncertain; died c. 1650 BC), was the 51st Assyrian king according to the Assyrian King List. (Note: Ḫorsābād King List ii 18.) He reigned for 12 years some time during the 17th century BC.

== Succession line and contemporaries ==
The Assyrian King List provides a sequence of five kings with short reigns purported to be father-son successions, leading Landsberger to suggest that Libaya, Sharma-Adad I, and Iptar-Sin may have been brothers of Belu-bani rather than his descendants. The list reports Iptar-Sin as the son of Sharma-Adad I. He is omitted from the list on another fragment. (Note: KAV 14.) He is called LIK.KUD-Šamaš on the Synchronistic King List (Note: Synchronistic King List A.117, Assur 14616c, i 5.) which gives his Babylonian counterpart as ^{m}DIŠ+U-EN (reading unknown), an unidentified person inserted between the reigns of Gulkišar and his son Pešgaldarameš of the Sealand Dynasty.

He was succeeded by Bazaya.

== Notes ==
Preceded by Sharma-Adad I	King of Assyria c. 1662 – c. 1650 BC	Succeeded by Bazaya
