= Ashur-dugul =

King of Assyria

King of Assyria
- Reign: c. 1715 BC
- Predecessor: Puzur-Sin

Aššūr-dugul, inscribed ^{m}aš-šur-du-gul, “Look to (the god) Aššur!”, (fl. c. 1715 BC) was the king of Assyria probably during the 18th century BC, a period of confusion in Assyrian history. Reigning for six years, he was the 44th ruler to be listed on the Assyrian Kinglist, and was designated by the list as a usurper succeeding the dynasty founded by Shamshi-Adad I.

== Reign ==
He seized power in the aftermath of the overthrow of the dynasty first established by Shamshi-Adad I, when native warlords jockeyed for power in the vacuum left by its demise. Shamshi-Adad I had been an Amorite who founded a brief, foreign dynasty which was apparently greatly resented by the locals. This resentment is attested by an alabaster slab inscription left by Puzur-Sin, an otherwise unattested Assyrian monarch who had deposed the son of Asinum, descendant of Shamshi-Adad I. The Assyrian Kinglist (Note: Khorsabad Kinglist, tablet IM 60017 (excavation nos.: DS 828, DS 32-54), ii 4–6.) (Note: SDAS Kinglist, tablet IM 60484, ii 8–9.) says of Ashur-dugul that he was a “son of a nobody, without right to the throne” meaning that he was not of royal descent and consequently unqualified to govern according to the patrilineal principle of legitimacy relied upon by later monarchs.

The Assyrian King List claims that during his reign six other kings, “sons of nobodies also ruled at the time.” This may suggest a fragmentation in the small Assyrian kingdom, with rival claims to the throne. Alternatively, Newgrosh proposes that these may actually have been his limmu’s, the officials appointed each year who gave the year its name, providing the eponym dating system, and that a later scribe may have confused them for kings. The last of these, Adasi, was to go on to found the succeeding dynasty. Apart from the two copies of the kinglist, there are no other extant references to him.

== Attestations ==
=== Inscriptions ===
Preceded by Puzur-Sin	King of Assyria c. 1715 BC	Succeeded by
