= Sutu, Iran =

Sutu سوتو
- Village
- Location within Iran
- Coordinates: 36°11′30″N 45°41′53″E
- Country: Iran
- Province: Kurdistan
- County: Baneh
- Bakhsh: Namshir
- Rural District: Nameh Shir

Population (2006)
  - Total: 197
- Time zone: UTC+3:30 (IRST)
  - Summer (DST): UTC+4:30 (IRDT)

Sutu (Persian: سوتو, also Romanized as Sūtū) is a village in Nameh Shir Rural District, Namshir District, Baneh County, Kurdistan Province, Iran. At the 2006 census, its population was 197, in 34 families. The village is populated by Kurds.
