= Usurper =

Illegitimate or controversial claimant to state power

A usurper is an illegitimate or controversial claimant to power, often but not always in a monarchy. In other words, one who takes the power of a country, city, or established region for oneself, without any formal or legal right to claim it as one's own. Usurpers can rise to power in a region by often unexpected physical force such as via a coup d'état, as well as through political influence and deceit.

== Etymology ==
The word originally came from the Latin word usurpare (“to seize", "to take forcefully" or "to use”).

== Politics ==
The ancient Greeks had their own conception of what usurpers were, calling them tyrants. In the ancient Greek usage, a tyrant (tyrannos/τύραννος in Greek) was an individual who rose to power via unconstitutional or illegitimate means, usually not being an heir to an existing throne. Such individuals were perceived negatively by political philosophers such as Socrates, Plato and Aristotle.

Usurpers often try to legitimize their position by claiming to be a descendant of a ruler that they may or may not be related to. According to Herodotus, this was done by someone impersonating Smerdis in order to seize the throne of Cyrus the Great after his death.

The concept of usurpation played a huge role in the governance of monarchies, often carrying disdain to those who have been accused of it. Lengthy advice was given to potential and actual usurpers by the political philosopher Niccolo Machiavelli in his book The Prince. Methods discussed were pertinent to the establishment of a more secure principality for the ruler, which Machiavelli stated would require evil to be done at some point.

== See also ==
- Roman usurper
- Son of a nobody
