= Ishme-Dagan I =

18th-century monarch

- Reign: c. 1776 – c. 1765 BC
- Predecessor: Shamshi-Adad I
- Died: c. 1765 BC
- Akkadian: Išme-Dagān I
- Father: Shamshi-Adad I

Ishme-Dagan I (Akkadian: Išme-Dagān; died c. 1765 BC) was a monarch of Ekallatum during the early 2nd Millennium BC. The much later and somewhat apocryphal Assyrian King List (AKL) credits Ishme-Dagan I with a reign of 40 years; however, it is now known from a limmu-list of eponyms unearthed at Kanesh in 2003 that his reign in Assur lasted around 11 years. According to the AKL, Ishme-Dagan I was the son and successor of Shamshi-Adad I. Also according to the much later literary composition Assyrian King List, Ishme-Dagan I might have been succeeded by a son Mut-Ashkur.

== Biography ==
=== Family ===
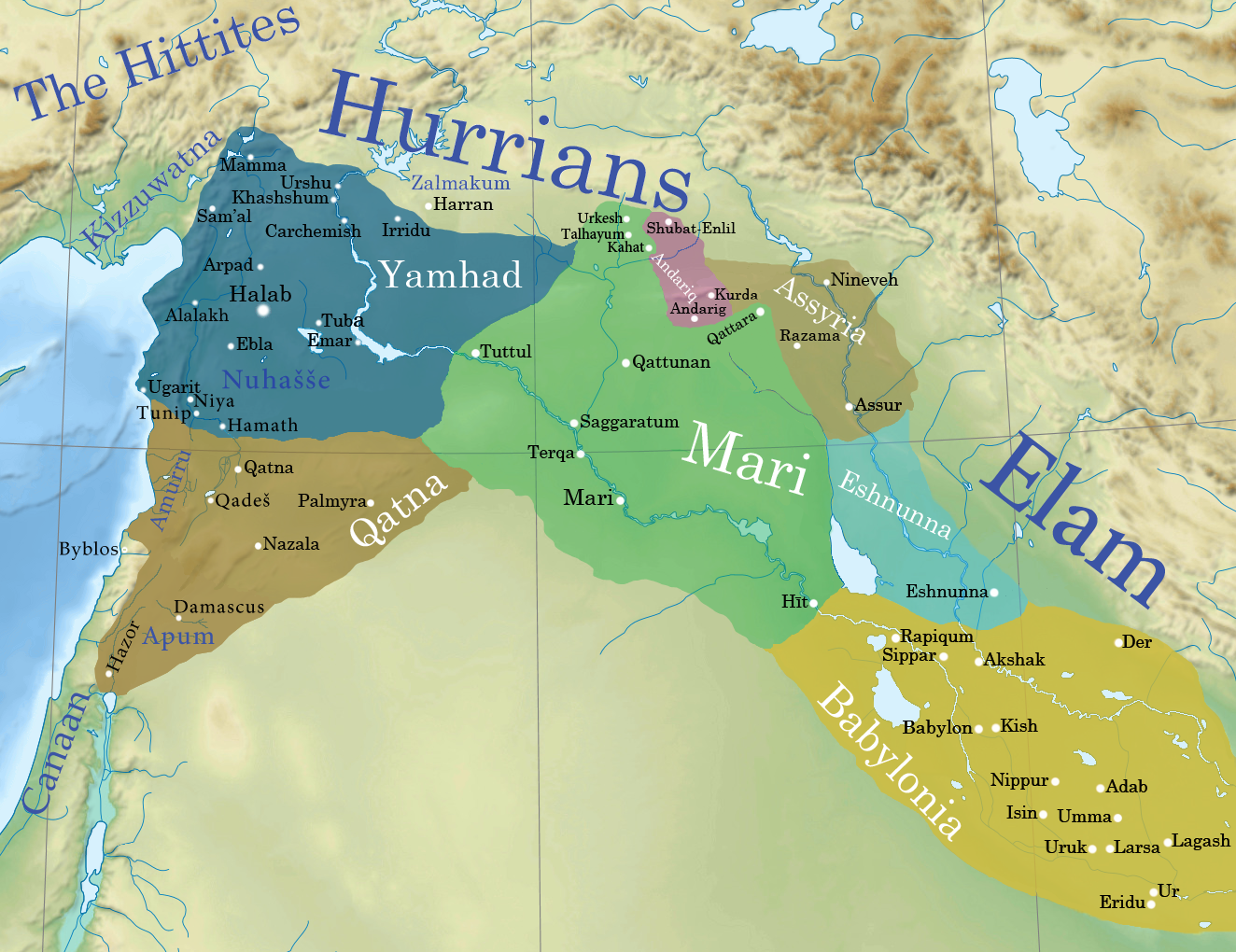
A map of the Ancient Near East showing the geopolitical situation around the Assur (light brown) near contemporary great powers such as: Eshnunna (light blue), Yamhad (dark blue), Qatna (dark brown), the First Dynasty of Babylon (yellow), and the Third Mariote Kingdom (shortly before the conquest of the long-abandoned town of Shubat-Enlil c. 1808 BC by the Amorite conqueror Shamshi-Adad I.)

Ishme-Dagan I's father, Shamshi-Adad I, was an Amorite king, originally of Terqa (in Syria), who formed the Kingdom of Upper Mesopotamia around 1808 BC.

Shamshi-Adad I ruled from Shubat-Enlil. Shamshi-Adad I placed his oldest son,Ishme-Dagan I, on the throne of Ekallatum. Shamshi-Adad I placed his youngest son, Yasmah-Adad, on the throne of Mari. Ishme-Dagan I ruled the south-eastern region in Upper Mesopotamia. Ishme-Dagan I's realm of influence included the city-state of Assur.

==== Correspondence ====
A number of letters relating the familial relationships between Shamshi-Adad I and his two sons have been excavated, and these letters provide a glimpse into the tensions of this family of rulers. Ishme-Dagan I is called, “A forceful soldier not afraid to risk his own skin.” This was a quality which allowed Shamshi-Adad I to rely on him unhesitatingly. Shamshi-Adad I's correspondence with his younger son is not as generous, and Ishme-Dagan I appears to have picked up his father's censure of his younger brother and contributed to it. In one letter, Ishme-Dagan I asks his brother, “Why are you setting up a wail about this thing? That is not great conduct.” In another letter, Ishme-Dagan I bluntly commands Yasmah-Adad to, “Show some sense.”

=== Conquests of Ishme-Dagan I ===
==== War against Eshnunna ====
The main challenge for Ishme-Dagan I was in keeping his enemies in check. To Ishme-Dagan I's south was the King Dadusha of Eshnunna. To Ishme-Dagan I's east were the warlike, nomadic, pastoral peoples inhabiting the foothills of the Zagros Mountains. Eshnunna became the chief enemy of Ishme-Dagan I. Although records are sparse, there are some accounts of some political conflicts involving Eshnunna. An instance of defeat occurs in a year-name coined by the King Dadusha of Eshnunna which commemorates a victory over an army led by Ishme-Dagan I.

==== Campaign against Qabra and Nurugum ====
Shamshi-Adad I, along with Ishme-Dagan I, embarked on a new campaign against both Qabra and Nurugum. During the course of the campaign on Nurugum, Ishme-Dagan I and his armies besieged the city of Nineveh. Once Ishme-Dagan I conquered Nineveh, he allowed some prisoners to enter his army, and gave special treatment to skilled prisoners (according to letters excavated from the period.) These expeditions betray the different attitudes of the urban peoples toward the tribal peoples. The people of the kingdoms were treated differently than the tribal people.

==== Campaign against the Ya’ilanum ====
Another campaign for which records exist is a campaign that Ishme-Dagan I appears to have fought against a nomadic tribe called the Ya’ilanum. Shamshi-Adad I had ordered Yasmah-Adad to execute all the members of this tribe. However, it was the troops of Ishme-Dagan I who later exterminated the entire tribe. There are two accounts of this annihilation, one from Shamshi-Adad I, and one from Ishme-Dagan I. Shamshi-Adad I seems to have slightly reneged on his earlier bloodthirstiness.

=== Death of Shamshi-Adad I ===
Although his father counted Ishme-Dagan I as politically astute and a capable soldier, commending him as he berated Yasmah-Adad in their letters, Ishme-Dagan I was not able to hold his father's empire for long after his father died. Ishme-Dagan I eventually lost most of his domain, and was reduced to holding Ashur and Ekallatum, despite waging several counter offensives to try to regain the upper Khabur area. The year-name of the fifth year of Ibalpiel II's reign (indicating some reverence to Shamshi-Adad I at his death) suggests that Eshnunna had become subservient to the Ekallatum. Ishme-Dagan I wrote a letter to his brother, after Ishme-Dagan I assumes their father's throne and the rule of all of Upper Mesopotamia, that he:

“Has the Elamites on a leash as well as their ally, the king of Eshnunna.”

His confidence was overstated, however; as year-names of the eighth and ninth years of King Ibalpiel's reign indicate Eshnunna attacked and destroyed the armies of Ashur and Mari, and Ishme-Dagan I's control over his father's entire realm slipped, as his hold was reduced to the region of Ashur and Ekallatum.

A letter that was purportedly from Ishme-Dagan I, writing to his brother after their father had died, states:

“I acceded to my father's throne, but having been very busy, I haven't sent you my news. Now you are my brother, and aside from you I have no brother. I will make peace with any city or king that you take as a vassal. Don't ever worry. Your throne is yours to keep.”

This letter led historians to believe that Yasmah-Adad held the throne of Mari for a while after his father died. However, this letter was proven to actually be from Ishme-Addu of Ashnakku, (written to Ibal-Addu of Ashlakka), thus disproving many chronologies that had been based on the letter.

In addition to letters whose authorship can be verified to Ishme-Dagan I, Shamshi-Adad I and Yasmah-Adad, there have been letters attributed to this family that were not written by them. One such letter caused issues in the chronology of the ancient near east, as it allowed historians to place dates on Hammurabi of Babylon.

=== Subservience to Babylon ===
Some evidence indicates that after his reduction in power, Ishme-Dagan I appeared to hold tolerable relations with Babylon, Eshnunna, and Mari. Hammurabi requested reinforcements from Ishme-Dagan I at least once, and Ishme-Dagan I responded, though it seems his response was grudging, and Hammurabi was not entirely pleased with the poor support. However, Ishme-Dagan's troops were present in Hammurabi's war against Elam, and Hammurabi even allowed Ishme-Dagan's generals into his secret council meetings, to the dismay of Zimri-Lim, Hammurabi's then ally. Ishme-Dagan's reputation with Hammurabi fluctuated with Hammurabi's goals, and there is some evidence that Hammurabi sent troops to aide Atamrum, one of Ishme-Dagan's rivals, during Babylon's war with Larsa.

== See also ==
- List of Mesopotamian dynasties
- Chronology of the ancient Near East
