= Puzur-Sin =

Assyrian king during the Old Assyrian Period

King of Assyria
- Reign: c. 1735 BC
- Predecessor: Asinum
- Successor: Ashur-dugul

Puzur-Sin (fl. c. 1735 BC) was an Assyrian king during the Old Assyrian period.

== Reign ==
One of the few known Assyrian rulers to be left out of the Assyrian King List, Puzur-Sin was responsible for ending the rule of the dynasty of Shamshi-Adad I, whom he considered to be foreign usurpers. He overthrew Asinum.
