= Sharma-Adad I =

King of Assyria
- Reign: c. 1674 – c. 1662 BC
- Predecessor: Libaya
- Successor: Iptar-Sin
- Died: c. 1662 BC

Sharma-Adad I inscribed ^{m}Šarma-Adad, (died c. 1662 BC) was the ruler of Assyria c. 1673 – 1662 BC (short chronology) or 1653 – 1642 BC (ultra-short).

== Succession ==
The Assyrian King List provides a sequence of five kings with short reigns purported to be father-son successions, leading Landsberger to suggest that Libaya, Sharma-Adad I, and Iptar-Sin may have been brothers of Belu-bani rather than his descendants. The list reports Iptar-Sin as the son of Sharma-Adad I. He is omitted from the list on another fragment.

== Sources ==
- Bertman, Stephen (2003). Handbook to Life in Ancient Mesopotamia. New York: Oxford University Press. ISBN 978-0-19-518364-1.
- Chen, Fei (2020). Study on the Synchronistic King List from Ashur. Leiden: BRILL. ISBN 978-90-04-43091-4.
