= Mut-Ashkur =

18th-century BC Mesopotamian noble

- Years active: c. 1764 BC

Mut-Ashkur (a Hurrian name; fl. c. 1764 BC) is known only by a mention in the much later literary composition Assyrian King List as a possible son of Ishme-Dagan I and is possibly mythical.
