= Adasi (Assyria) =

King of Assyria
- Reign: c. 1700 BC
- Successor: Bel-bani
- Issue: Bel-bani

Adasi (fl. c. 1700 BC) was according to the Assyrian King List a usurper-king in Assyria during, or shortly after, the reign of the Ashur-dugul and through his son Bel-bani the progenitor of the later Adaside dynasty. Because the name of Adasi and the other seven usurpers said to have vied for power against Ashur-dugul and each other do not appear in other sources and are suspiciously similar to the names of the eponyms under Ashur-dugul's reign, modern scholars question whether Adasi and the others were kings or usurpers at all, and not simply generals and officials misattributed as kings by the scribes of the list.
