= Shu-Ninua =

- Issi'ak Assur

King of Assur
- Reign: c. 1615–1602 BC
- Predecessor: Lullaya
- Successor: Sharma-Adad II
- Issue: Sharma-Adad II
- Father: Bazaya

Shu-Ninua or ŠÚ- or Kidin-Ninua, inscribed ^{m}ŠÚ-URU.AB x ḪA, (Note: Khorsabad Kinglist, tablet IM 60017 (excavation nos.: DS 828, DS 32-54). ii 24, 26, 28 and 35,) (Note: SDAS Kinglist, tablet IM 60484, ii 20, 21, 22 and 27.) the 54th king to appear on the Assyrian Kinglist, was the ruler of Assyria, c. 1615–1602 BC, and was the son of his predecessor-but-one, succeeding Lullaya, a "son of nobody".

== Name and contemporaries ==
The reading of the first element in his name is uncertain, as Ignace Gelb and Benno Landsberger originally proposed BAR, giving Kidin-Ninua, "[Under] the protection of Nineveh," while Arno Poebel read the name as beginning with [Š]Ú- and Weidner read it as [Š]I- on another fragmentary copy of the kinglist. (Note: Kinglist fragment VAT 9812 (KAV 14), 6.) J. A. Brinkman observed that with the exception of this disputed interpretation, all transliterations gave ŠÚ, reinforced by the Synchronistic Kinglist, (Note: Synchronistic Kinglist, Ass. 14616c, i 8.) ˹^{m}ŠÚ-ni˺-nu-a, which had led to the preponderance for interpreting his name as Shu-Ninua in recent years, "he of Ishtar," if Nina is correctly identified as a Babylonian name for this deity, although this remains unproven. A recleaning of the fragmentary kinglist, however, has revealed a name collated by Heeßel to be [^{m}ki-d]in-^{d}NINUA.

There are no contemporary inscriptions of his reign. He is recorded as having been a contemporary of Akurduana of the Sealand Dynasty in southern Babylonia in the Synchronistic Kinglist, rather than any supposed ruler from the Kassite dynasty. The Assyrian Kinglist records that he reigned for fourteen years before being succeeded by his sons, Sharma-Adad II and then Erishum III.

== Inscriptions ==
Preceded by Lullaya	King of Assyria; 1615–1602 BC	Succeeded by Sharma-Adad II
