= Asinum =

King of Assyria

King of Assyria
- Reign: c. 1735 BC
- Successor: Puzur-Sin
- Died: c. 1735 BC

Asinum (died c. 1735 BC) was a king of Assyria, and a grandson of Shamshi-Adad I. He was overthrown by Puzur-Sin because he was of Amorite extraction; not included in the standard King List, but attested in Puzur-Sin's inscription.

Asinum was deposed in a revolt that aimed to restore the traditions of Old Assyrian period. In the inscription left by Puzur-Sin, the Amorite kings beginning with Shamsi-Adad I were described as "foreign plague not of the flesh of the city of Assur" while the latter was accused of constructing a palace for himself (possibly a reference to the so-called Old Palace built next to the ziggurat) and destroying old Assyrian shrines. After Asinum's rule, anarchy ensued in Assyria after a series of eight usurpers seized the throne.

It is unclear whether Asinum was a personal name or a title.
