= Libaya =

King of Assyria
- Reign: c. 1691 – c. 1674 BC
- Predecessor: Bel-bani
- Successor: Sharma-Adad I
- Died: c. 1674 BC

Libaya, inscribed ^{m}li-ba-a-a, (died c. 1674 BC) reigned as king of Assyria c. 1690–1674 BC. He succeeded Bel-bani in the Adaside dynasty.

== Reign ==
There are few royal inscriptions and archival texts from Assyria from the 17th to the 15th century BCE, and sources from other regions likewise contain little information on what was going on in Assyria at the time. Due to this lack of sources, historical developments in and around Assur at this time are poorly understood. Libaya's reign is situated near the beginning of this "dark age". He is, however, mentioned in the Assyrian King List (AKL). The AKL lists him as being the son of his predecessor Bel-bani and the father of his successor Sharma-Adad I, and as having reigned for 17 years. This is the only mention of Libaya in the historical record.

The Assyriologist Benno Landsberger suggested that the AKL should not be interpreted literally, and that Libaya and Sharma-Adad I were actually Bel-bani's brothers.

Preceded by Bel-bani	King of Assyria c. 1691 – c. 1674 BC	Succeeded by Sharma-Adad I
