= Bel-bani =

King of Assyria
- Reign: c. 1700 – c. 1691 BC
- Predecessor: Adasi
- Successor: Libaya
- Died: c. 1691 BC
- Father: Adasi

Bel-bani or Bēl-bāni, inscribed ^{md}EN-ba-ni, “the Lord is the creator,” (died c. 1691 BC) was the king of Assyria from around 1700 to around 1691 BC and was the first ruler of what was later to be called the dynasty of the Adasides. His reign marks the inauguration of a new historical phase following the turmoil of the competing claims of the seven usurpers who preceded him. He was the 48th king to appear on the Assyrian King List and reigned for around 10 years.

== Biography ==
He was the son of Adasi, the last of the seven monarchs who were “sons of nobody,” i.e. unrelated to previous kings, and who had competed for the throne over a period of six years. He was to be revered by later monarchs, notably Esarhaddon but also his second and third sons Shamash-shum-ukin and Ashurbanipal, for restoring stability and founding a dynasty which endured and where he assumed semi-mythical status as their ancestor figure. Esarhaddon described himself as "a lasting offspring (liplippi dārû) of Belu-bani the son of Adasi, precious scion of Baltil (pir'i BAL.TIL sûquru)." Baltil, the “city of wisdom,” was the name of the ancient precincts of the god Ašshu in the innermost part of the city of Assur.

He was succeeded by Libaya, which the Assyrian King List gives as his son, although Landsberger has suggested that he was in fact his brother.

Preceded by Adasi	King of Assyria c. 1700 – c. 1691 BC	Succeeded by Libaya
