= Isin-Larsa period =

Historical epoch 2000–1800 BC

- c. 2025 BCE – c. 1763 BCE
- Location of the cities of Isin and Larsa
- Capital: Isin and Larsa
- Common languages: Akkadian, Sumerian
- Religion: Akkadian religion
- Government: Monarchy
- King
- Historical era: Bronze Age
  - Established: c. 2025 BCE (MC)
  - Disestablished: c. 1763 BCE (MC)
Preceded by	Succeeded by
Third Dynasty of Ur	Old Babylonian Empire; Sealand Dynasty
- Today part of: Iraq

The Isin-Larsa period (c. 2025–1763 BCE, Middle Chronology, or 1961–1699 BCE, Short Chronology) is a phase in the history of ancient Mesopotamia, which extends between the end of the Third Dynasty of Ur and the conquest of Mesopotamia by King Hammurabi of Babylon leading to the creation of the First Babylonian dynasty. According to the approximate conventional dating, this period begins in 2025 BCE and ended in 1763 BCE. It constitutes the first part of the Old Babylonian period (2025–1595 BCE), the second part being the period of domination of the first dynasty of Babylon, which ends with the Sack of Babylon in 1595 BCE and the rise of the Kassites.

The Third Dynasty of Ur immediately preceded the Isin-Larsa period, and its fall was due to the combined attacks of the Amorites from the west, and the Elamites from the east. As its name suggests, the Isin-Larsa period saw successively the emergence of two great powers in Lower Mesopotamia: the kingdom of Isin, which sought to succeed the kingdom of Ur after its fall and established the Dynasty of Isin; and the kingdom of Larsa, whose fall marks the end of the period. In reality, neither of these two kingdoms exercised an undeniable hegemony in Lower Mesopotamia, and they had to coexist with other less powerful kingdoms (such as Uruk, Babylon, and Mankisum), while further north their influence was non-existent and gave way to other powerful political entities (Eshnunna, Ekallatum, Mari, Yamkhad). The dynasties of this period have in common a Semitic Amorite origin, even if they quickly acculturated to Mesopotamian traditions.

== Isin as the main polity (2025–1924 BCE) ==
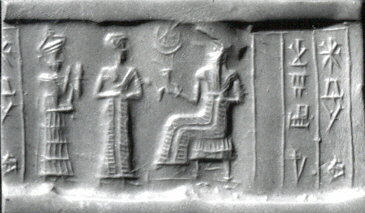
Impression of a cylinder seal. Presentation scene, c. 2000–1750 B.C. Isin-Larsa.

When the deteriorating Third Dynasty of Ur (Ur III) finally collapsed at the hands of the Elamites at the end of the third millennium BCE, a power vacuum was left that other city-states scrambled to fill. The last king of the Ur III dynasty, Ibbi-Sin, lacked the resources and the organized government needed to expel the Elamite invaders. One of his governmental officials, Ishbi-Erra, relocated from Ur to Isin, another city in southern Mesopotamia, and established himself as a ruler there. One of Ishbi-Erra's year names reports his defeat of Ibbi-Sin in battle.

Although he is not considered to be a part of the Third Dynasty of Ur, Ishbi-Erra did make some attempts at continuing the trappings of that dynasty, most likely to justify his rule. Ishbi-Erra had ill luck expanding his kingdom, however, for other city-states in Mesopotamia rose to power as well—Eshnunna and Ashur were developing into powerful centers. However, he did succeed in repulsing the Elamites from the Ur region. This gave the Isin dynasty control over the culturally significant cities of Ur, Uruk, and the spiritual center of Nippur.

For over 100 years, Isin flourished. Remains of large building projects, such as temples, have been excavated. Many royal edicts and law-codes from that period have been discovered. The centralized political structure of Ur III was largely continued, with Isin's rulers appointing governors and other local officials to carry out their will in the provinces. Lucrative trade routes to the Persian Gulf remained a crucial source of income for Isin.

== Rise and dominance of Larsa (c. 1924–1763 BCE) ==
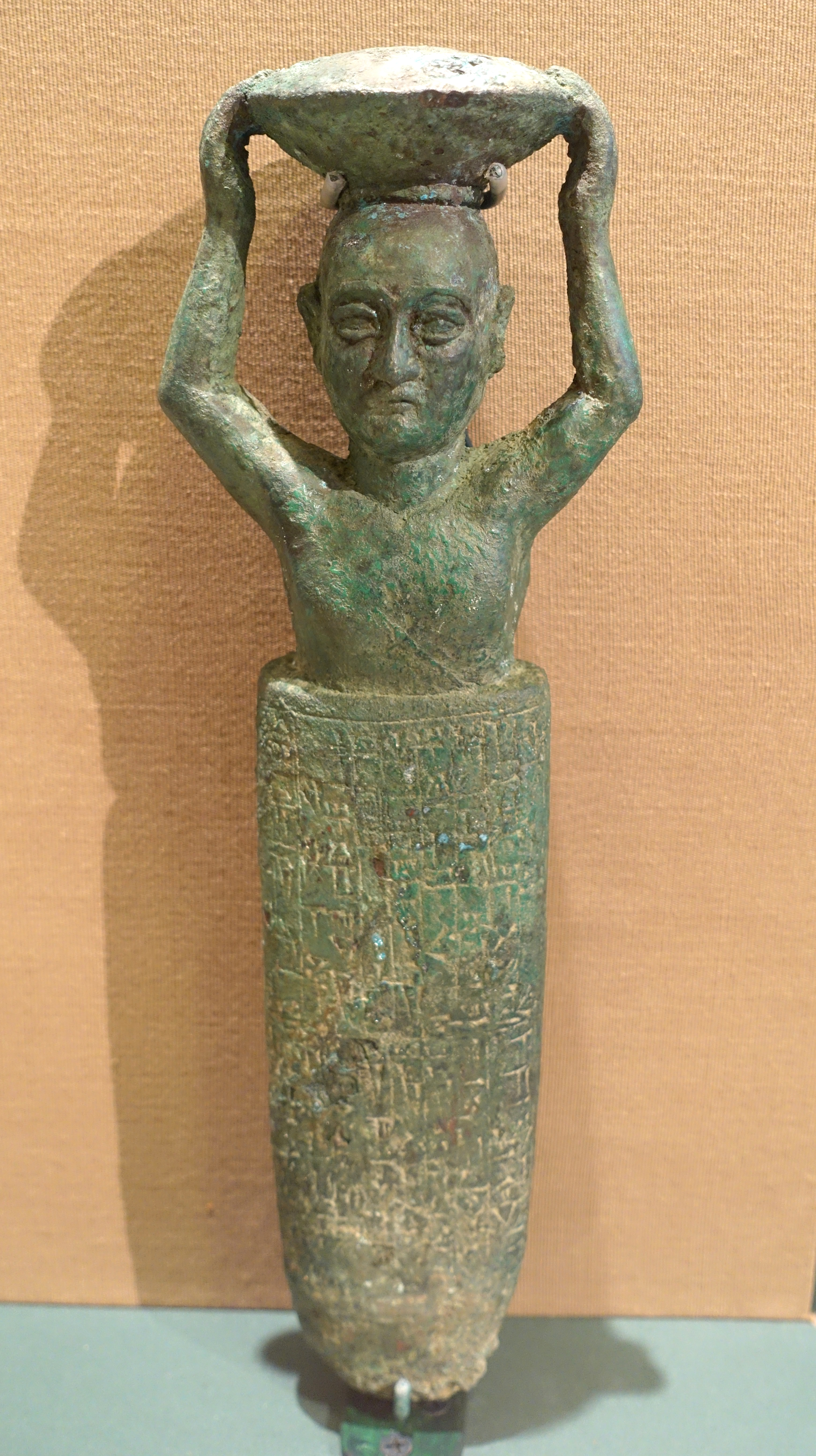
King of Larsa Rim-Sin I foundation figurine, 1822–1763 BCE. Oriental Institute Museum, University of Chicago

The city of Larsa had been subject to the city of Lagash, which had been captured by the Isin ruler Ishbi-Erra. He and his successors appointed governors to rule over Larsa. One such governor was an Amorite named Gungunum, who eventually broke with Isin and established his own independent dynasty in Larsa. This was akin to a coup d'état, and Isin quickly lost political and economic force, which it never again regained.

The exact events surrounding Isin's disintegration as a kingdom are mostly unknown, but some evidence can be pieced together from the historical and archaeological record. For Gungunum to legitimize his rule and deliver a blow to Isin, he captured the city of Ur. As the region of Larsa was the main center of trade via the Persian Gulf, Isin had lost access to enormously profitable trade routes. Ur was a city with tremendous historic and cultic significance; at some point, another cultic center, Nippur, was also lost. Documents also indicate that Isin had a huge problem maintaining access to its water sources. Gungunum's two successors, Abisare (c. 1841–1830 BCE) and Sumuel (c. 1830–1801 BCE), both took steps to completely cut off Isin's access to canals by rerouting them into Larsa.

Larsa grew powerful, but never accumulated much territory. At its peak, under king Rim-Sin I (c. 1758–1699 BCE), Larsa only controlled 10–15 other city-states — nowhere near the territory controlled by other dynasties in Mesopotamian history. Nevertheless, huge building projects and agricultural undertakings have been found by archaeologists.

Around 1860 BCE, an outsider named Enlil-bani seized the throne of Isin, ending the hereditary dynasty established by Ishbi-Erra over 150 years earlier.

== Demise ==
Hammurabi of Babylon founded the First Babylonian dynasty and united the whole region, after defeating the city of Larsa in 1763 BCE, as well as Eshnunna and Mari. After the defeat of Rim-Sin I by Hammurabi of Babylon, Larsa became a minor site, though it has been suggested that it was the home of the First Sealand Dynasty of Babylon.

== Art ==
Artistically, the Isin-Larsa period is a period of turmoil, marked by the rise of the influence of the Amorites for the northwest of Mesopotamia. Life was often unstable, and non-Sumerian invasions a recurring theme. It is often difficult to distinguish between the art of Isin-Larsa and the art of the First Babylonian Dynasty, except when inscriptions permit datable attribution.

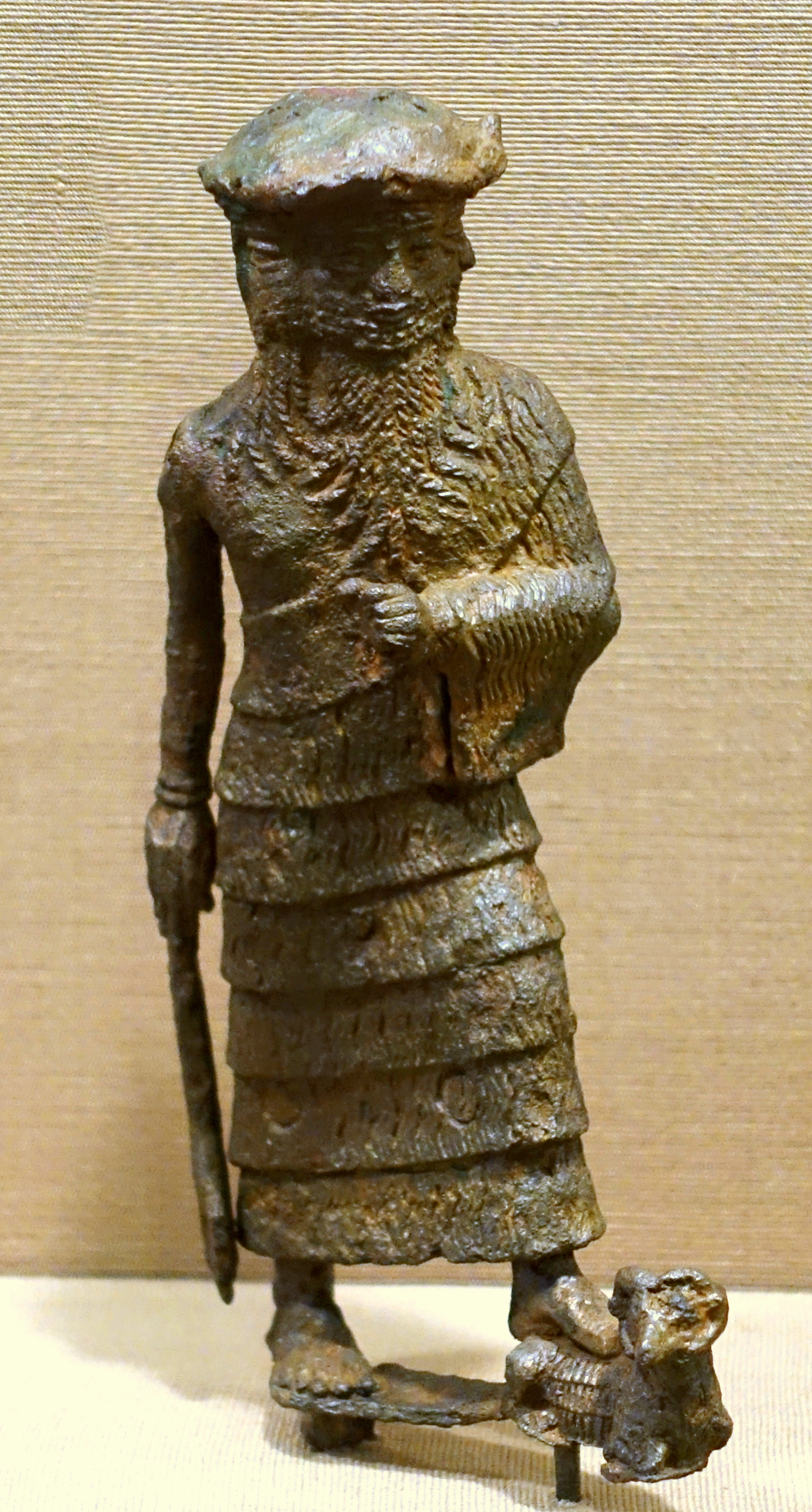
Four-faced god, Ishchali, Isin-Larsa to Old Babylonia periods, 2000–1600 BCE, bronze - Oriental Institute Museum, University of Chicago

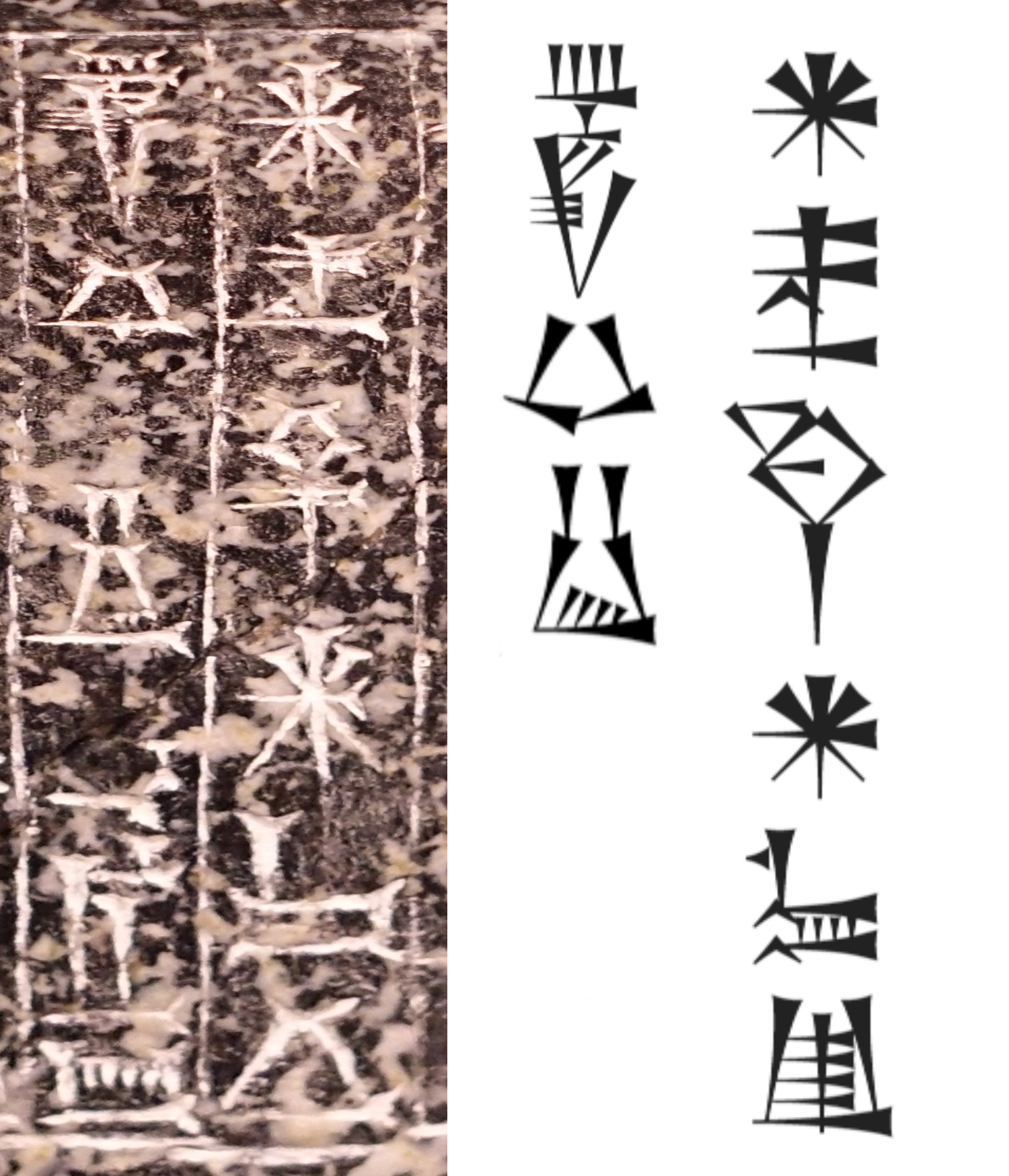
Title "Rim-Sin, King of Larsa" on the stone bowl:
𒀭𒊑𒅎𒀭𒂗𒍪 Rim-Sin
𒈗 King of
𒌓𒀕 Larsa

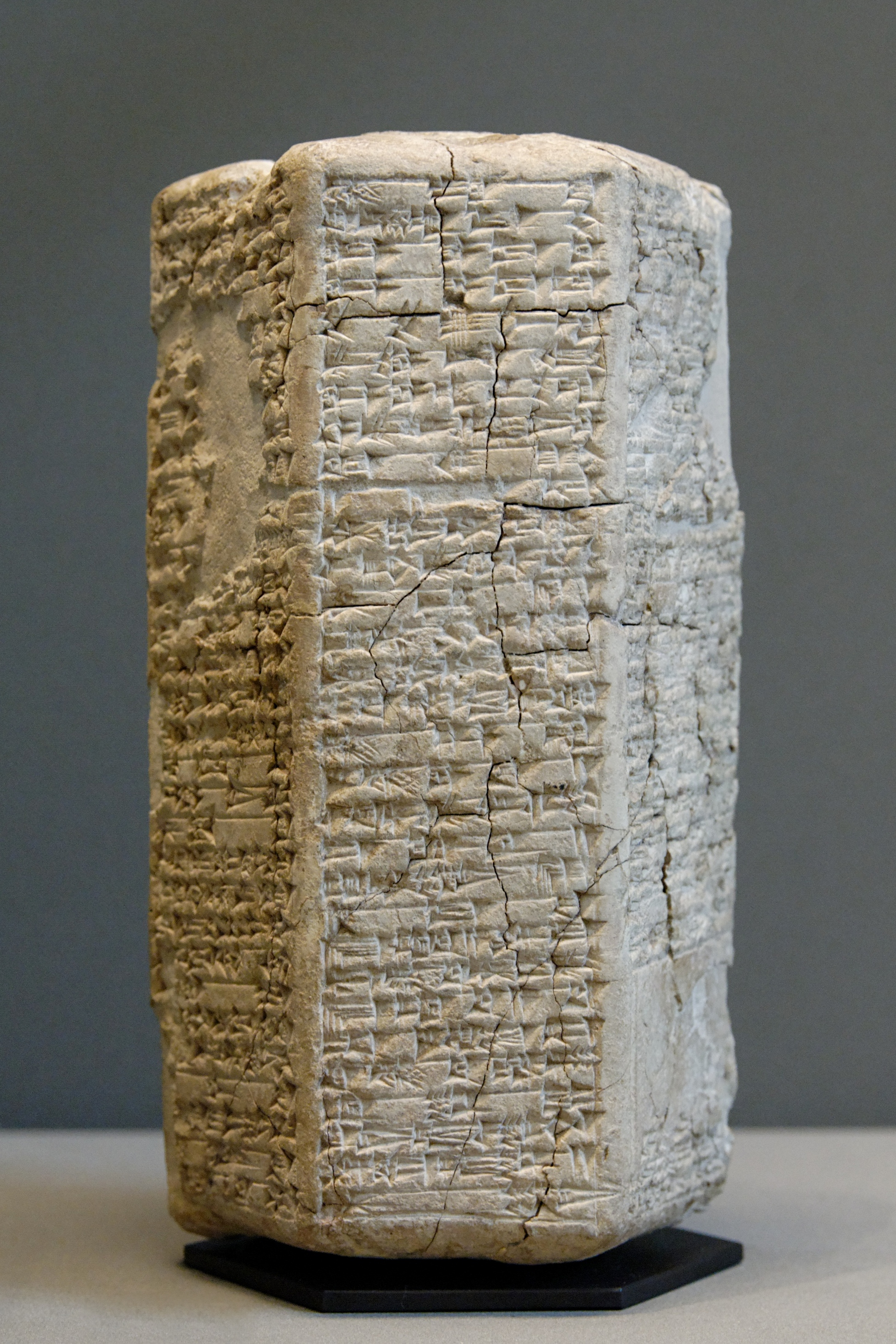
A praise poem to Iddin-Dagān, currently at Musée du Louvre

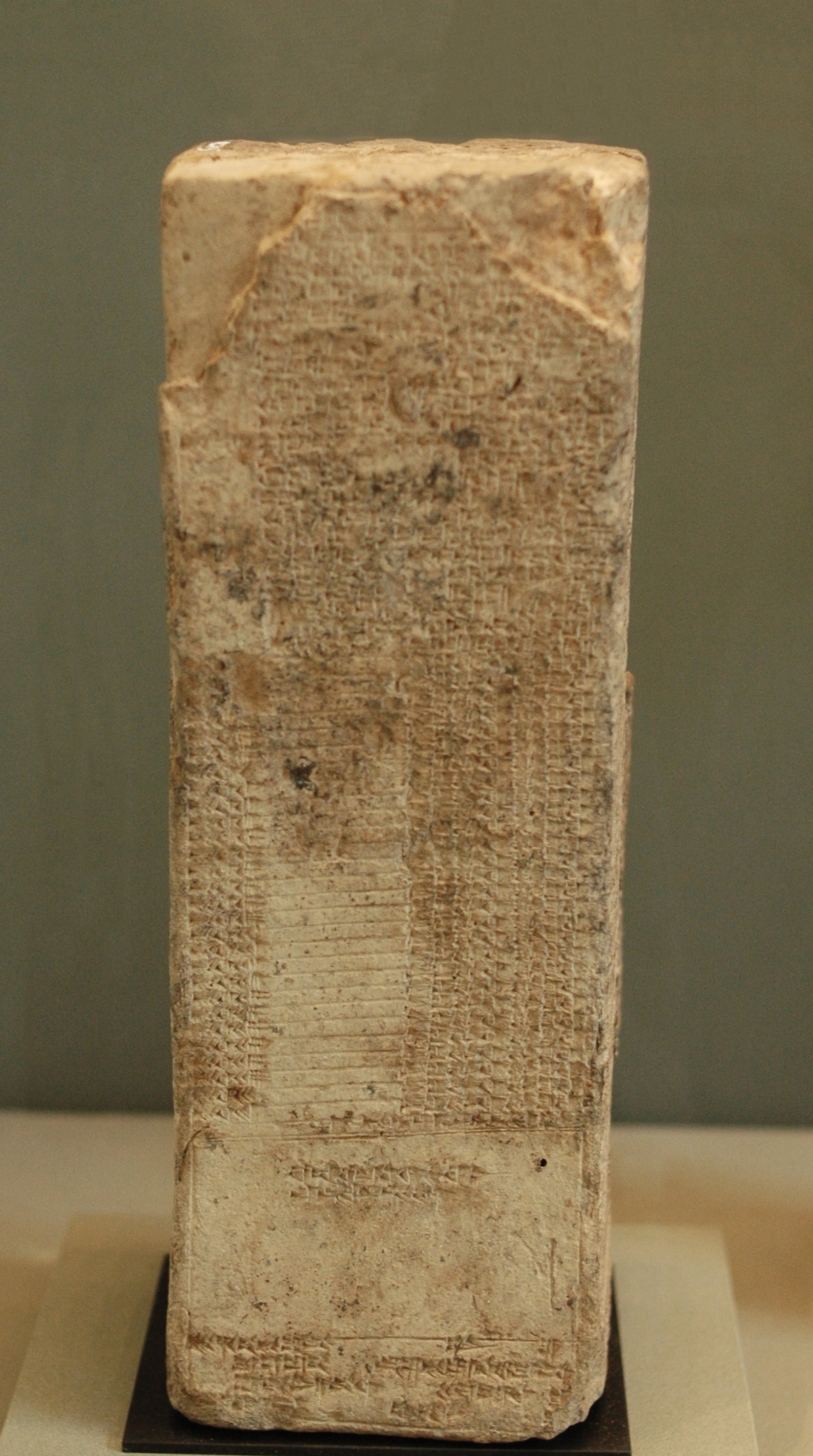
List of the kings of Larsa, Louvre Museum.

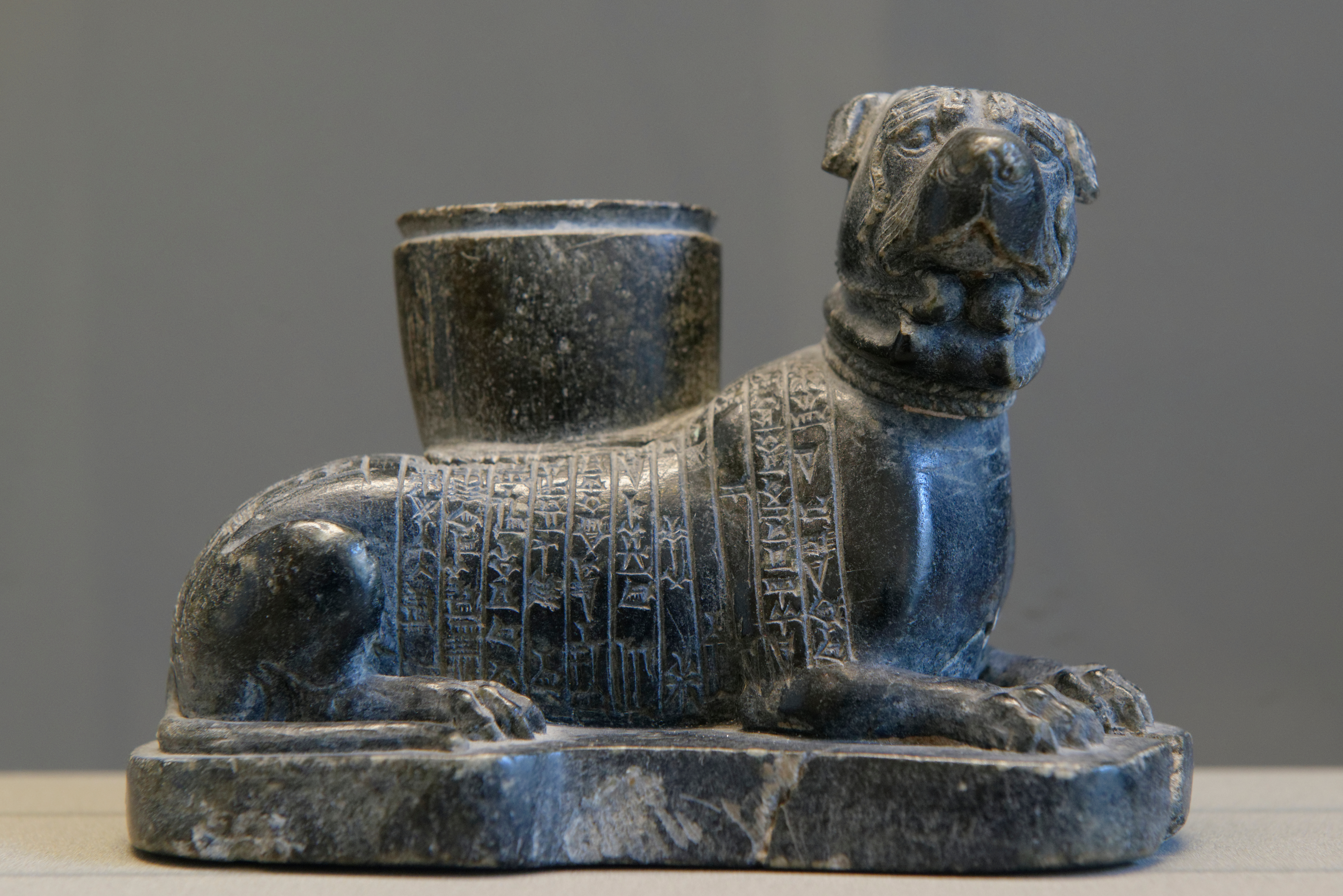
Votive statuette of a dog, dedicated by a doctor from Lagash to goddess Ninisina, for the life of Sûmû-El, king of Larsa. Musée du Louvre.

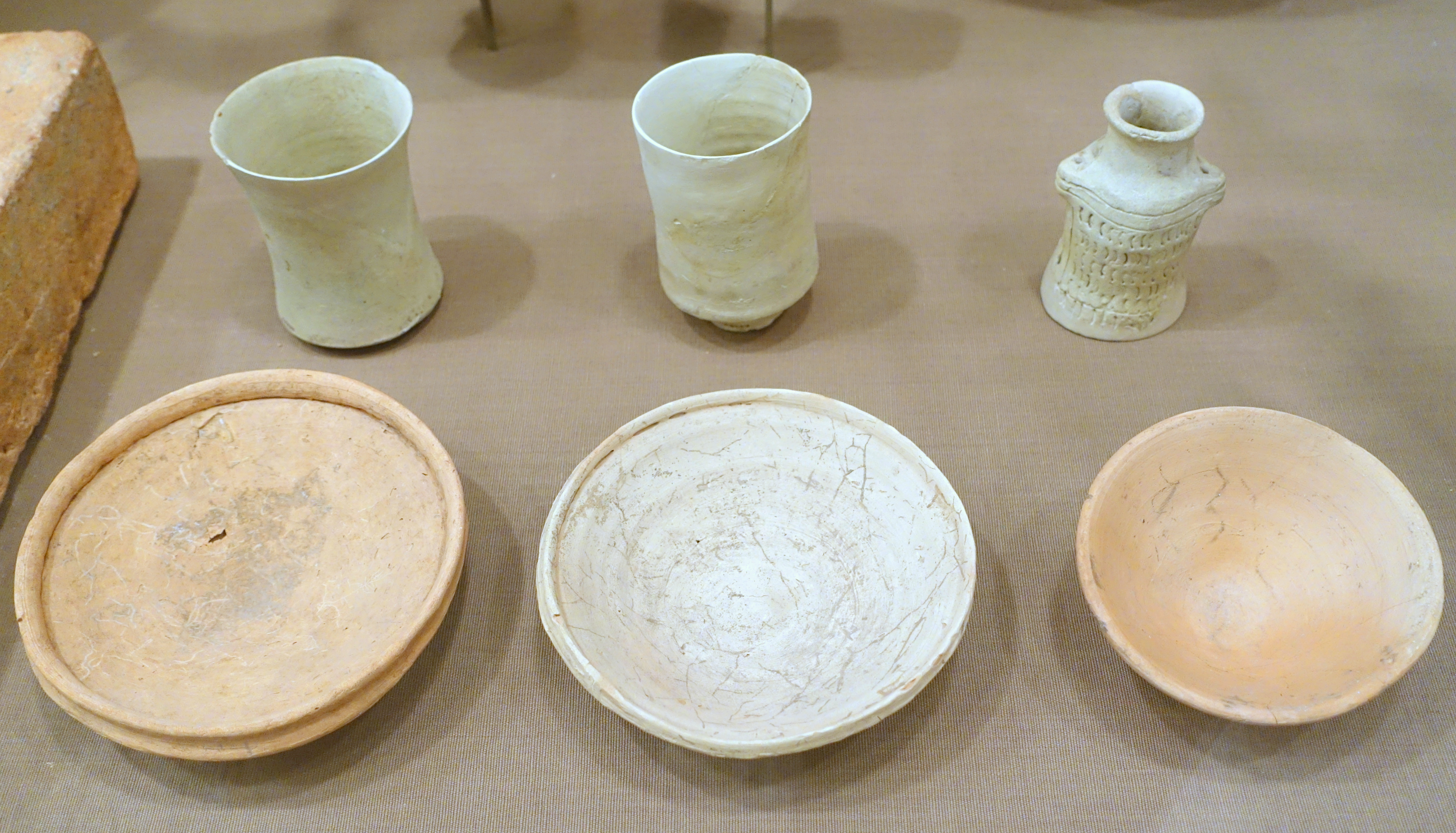
Ceramics from the Isin-Larsa period. Museum of Oriental Institute of Chicago

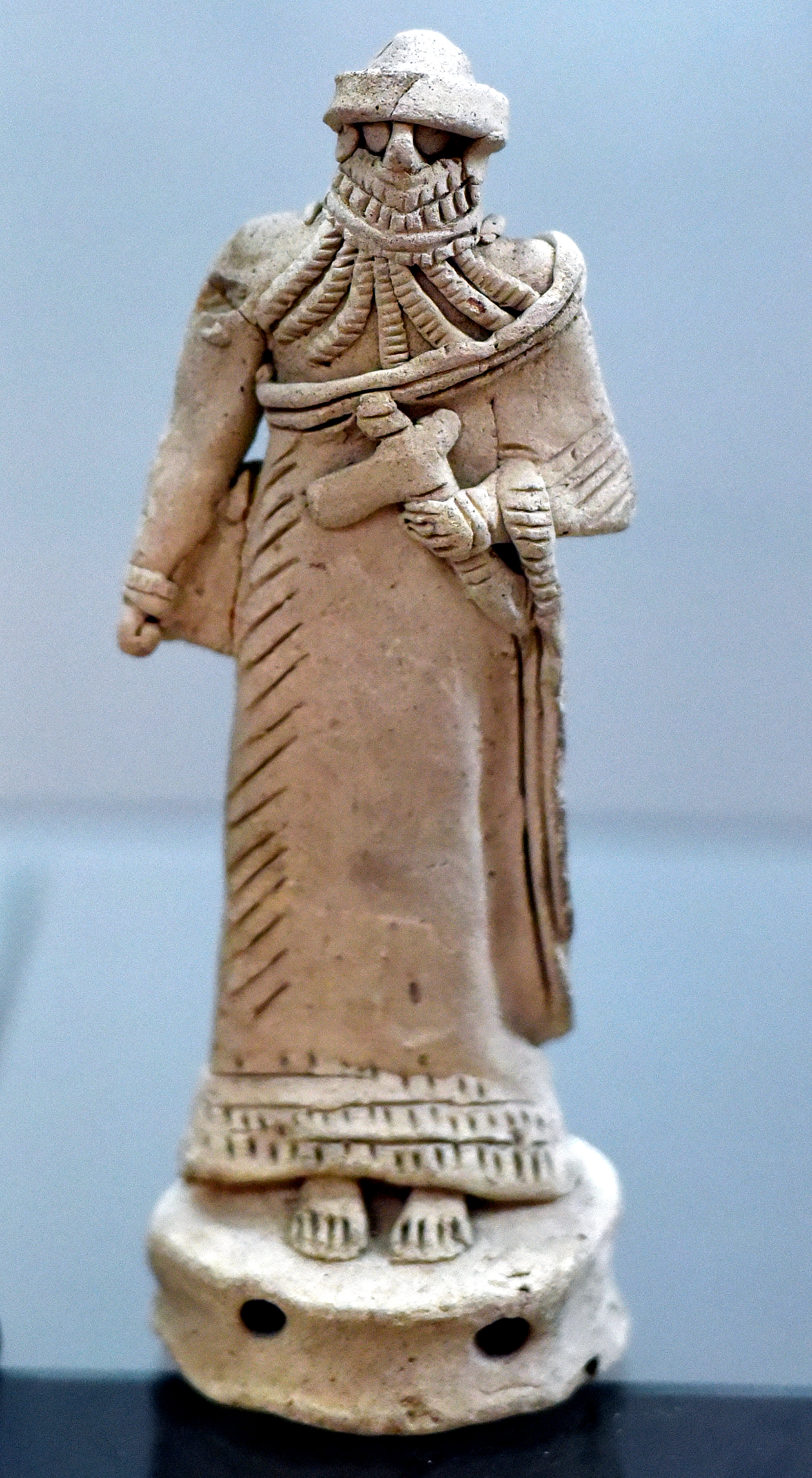
Terracotta male figurine holding an axe or adze, from Tell Telloh, Isin-Larsa period, c. 1900 BCE. Iraq Museum
