= Zabaia =

19th century BCE ruler of the city-state Larsa

Ruler of Larsa
- Reign: c. 1941-1932 BC
- Died: c. 1932 BC
- Father: Samium

Location of Larsa

Zabâia (also Zabâya) governed the ancient Near East city of Larsa c. 1941 BC-1932 BC (MC). He was an Amorite and the son of Samium. He is thought to have been the brother of Gungunum.

A brick inscription found at Larsa reads, "Zabaya, Chief of the Amorites, son of Samium, re-built the Ebabbar" (Zabaya rabian Amurri mar Samium Ebabbara ipus). The E-babbar is a temple of the god Shamash. An alternate reading is the he "built" the Ebabbar". This is the only known textual mention of Samium outside the Larsa King List. A damaged clay cone found at Mashkan-shapir carries a similar text. A fragmentary text about deliveries to Isin, found at Girsu, mentioned Zabaia "... since Zabaia, my lord, assumed the throne ...". Larsa ruler Abisare also used the "Chief of the Amorites" title.

A cylinder seal impression read "Princess Rubatum daughter of Zabaya and wife of Ištar-kima-iliya". A Neo-Babylonian or Late Babylonian copy of a bronze figurine read "To Nanse, the powerful lady, lady of the boundary (?), his lady, for the life of Zabaya, the strong king, chief of the Amorites ...".

== See also ==
- Chronology of the ancient Near East
- List of Mesopotamian dynasties
