= Nur-Adad =

King (Lugal) of Larsa

King of Larsa
- Reign: c. 1866-1850 BC
- Predecessor: Sumuel
- Successor: Sin-Iddinam
- Died: c. 1850 BC
- Issue: Sin-Iddinam

Location of Larsa

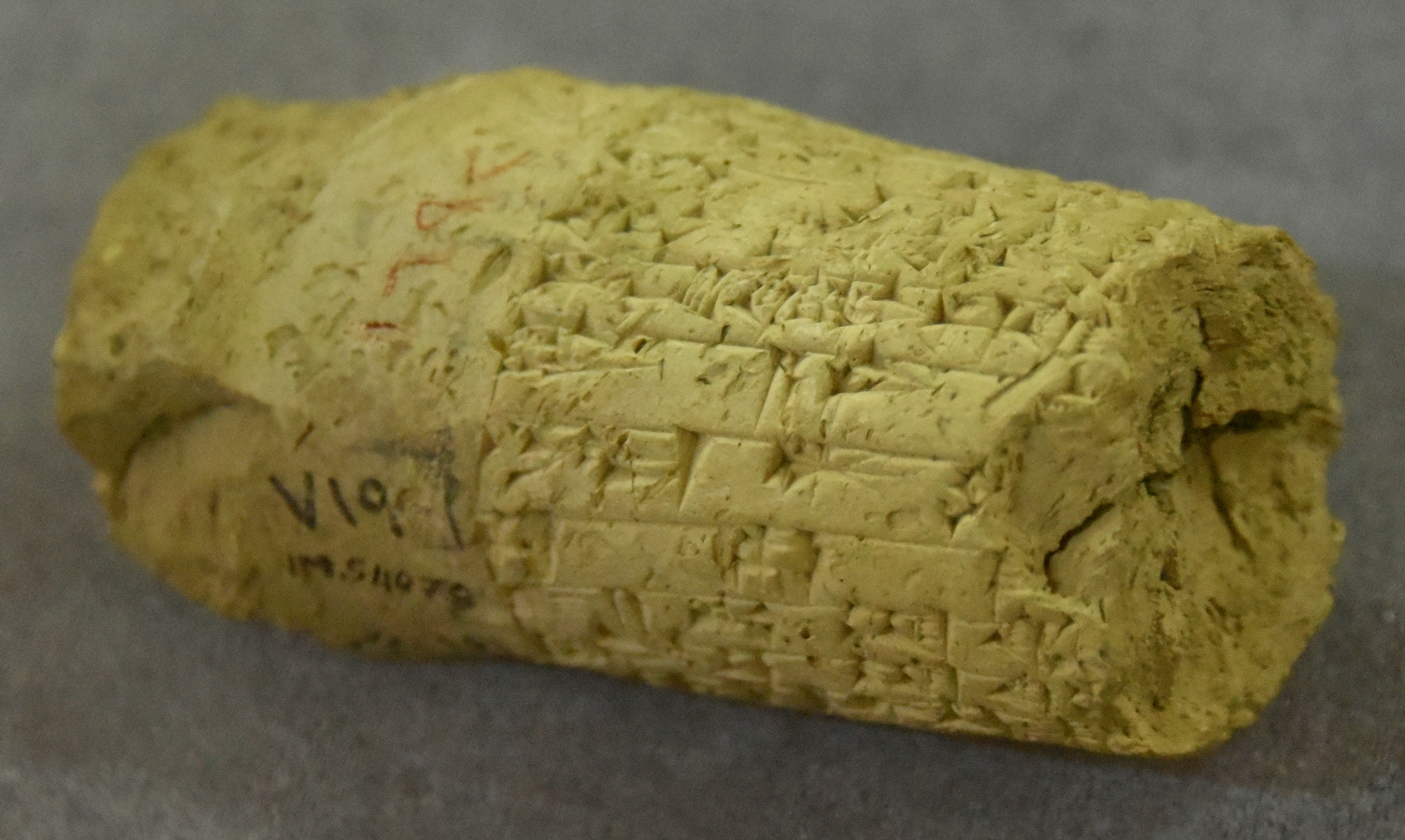
Clay cone of Nur-Adad, king of Larsa. 19th century BC. From Sulaymaniyah Museum, Iraq.

Foundation Cone of Nur-Adad of Larsa, circa 1865-1850 BCE, Fitzwilliam Museum, Cambridge

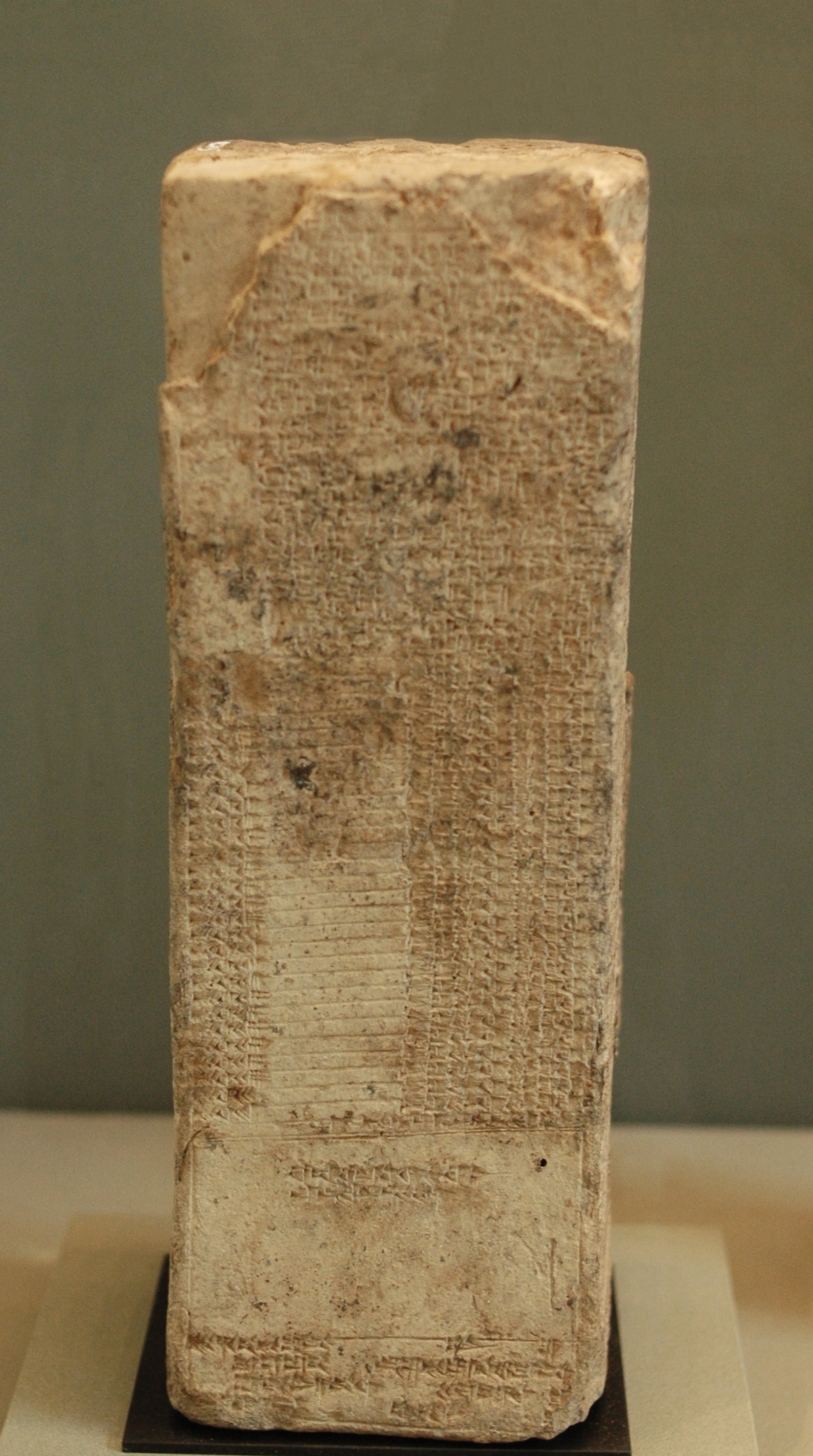
Kings Larsa Louvre AO7025

Nur-Adad ruled the ancient Near East city-state of Larsa from c. 1866-1850 (MC). Some of his inscriptions show him with a divine determinitive, ^{D}Nur-Adad, indicating that he was deified at some point in his reign (as were his successors). He was a contemporary of Sumu-la-El of Babylon and Sîn-kasid of Uruk and is generally thought to mark the start of a new dynasty in Larsa which was not Amorite or choose to no longer identify itself as Amorite. Beginning with Nur-Adad the "King of Ur" part of the royal titulary became "Provider of Ur". Two letters of his son and successor Sin-Iddinam indicate that the ascension of Nur-Adad followed a period of crisis in Larsa. One read "... House was turned against house. Battle was waged in its public square. Murder was committed by means of weapons. In all the streets ruin set in. Brother consumed brother. The troops who deserted perished by hunger or weapons. ...". It has been suggested that the disruption was due to Šimaškian incursions. His presumed regnal length of 16 years is based one the Larsa King List (Larsa Date List). Not to be confused with Nūr-Adad the Tēmannite, and Iron Age period opponent of the Neo-Assyrians.

About 13 year names, primarily about religious actions, of Nur-Adad are known, notably:

- Year (Nur-Adad) dug anew the Euphrates which was filled with sand
- Year Mashkan-shapir was seized
- Year the temple of Enki in Eridu was built
- Year the great city wall of Larsa was built

A cache of tablets found at Tell Waresh 2, near Nippur some of which contained year names of Nur-Adad. Bricks found at Eridu and Ur indicated that Nur-Adad restored of the temple and rites of Enki at Eridu, as reflected in one of those year names.

"I, Nur-Adad, the mighty man, the faithful farmer of Ur, king of Larsa, who purified the rites of the shrine Ebabbar: Eridu, which long ago had been damaged-I wanted to (re)build it so that I might make its reign prosperous. For Enki I built his beloved holy dwelling. I restored its primeval design for him"

An unprovenanced tablet, held in the Schoyen Collection, holds a building plan which has been described as the building plan of the Nur-Adad palace at Larsa though this is uncertain.

During this period the city of Ur was under the control of Larsa. At one point there was a rebellion in Ur led by Na'id-Shamash which was curshed by Mur-Adad stating "... When he rejoiced the heart of Ur, and expelled the evil Na'id-Shamash, and of the throne of Larsa he established its foundation, and brought back the people to subjection," in an inscription. He acted " at the behest of the gods Utu, Ningirsu, Inanna of Zabala, and Iskur, tutelary deities of the cities Larsa, Girsu, Zabala and Karkar, which formed the core of the Larsa stat". Inscribed clay cones found at Ur indicate Nur-Adad built the Ganunmah temple of Ningal, built a great oven for the god Nanna, and restored the bedroom of Ningal at Ur "built for his own life E.NUN-kug, her residence, the alcove of the warrior Sin".

== See also ==
- Chronology of the ancient Near East
- List of Mesopotamian dynasties
