= Letter from Iddin-Sin to Zinu =

Old Babylonian letter

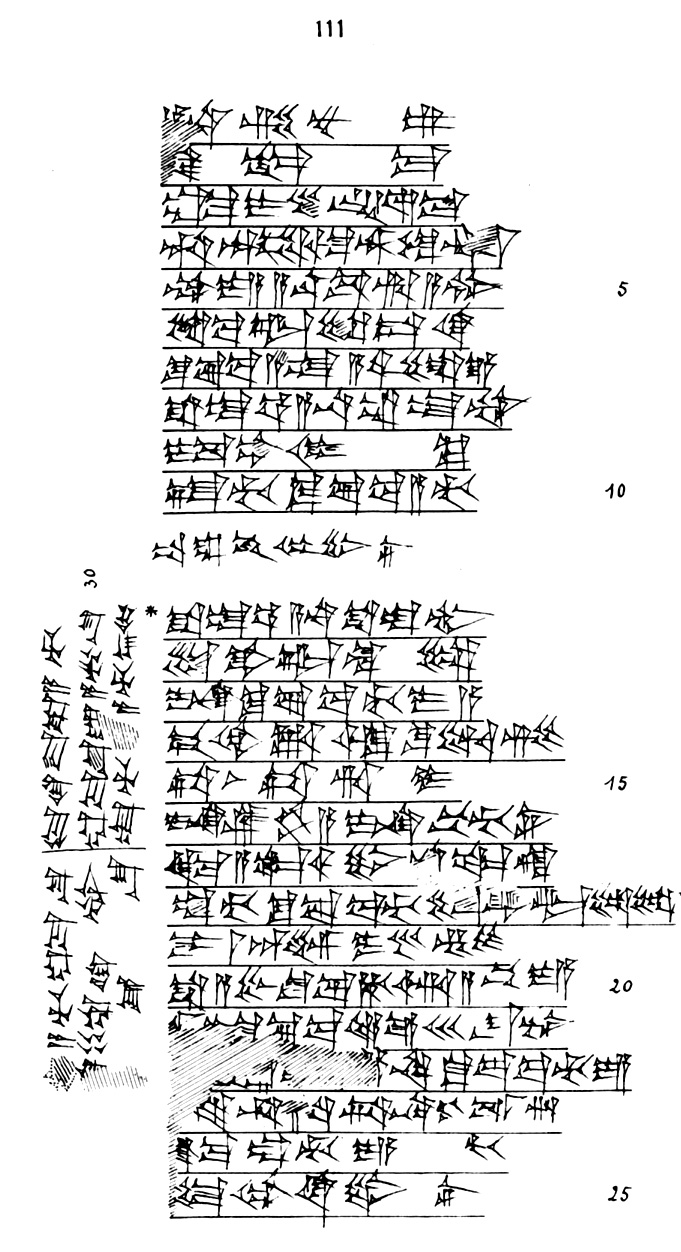
Akkadian text of the letter

The letter from Iddin-Sin to Zinu, also known by its technical designation TCL 18 111, is an Old Babylonian letter written by the student Iddin-Sin to his mother Zinu. It is thought to have been written in the city of Larsa in the 18th century BC, around the time of Hammurabi's reign (c. 1792–1750 BC). Disappointed with the clothes his mother had woven for him compared to those of his peers, Iddin-Sin complains in the letter about receiving inferior garments and points out that even the adopted son of one of his father's servants had better clothing. The letter is often cited as a document giving insight into daily life in ancient Mesopotamia and as an example of the unchanging essence of human nature through the ages.

== Translation ==
The Assyriologist A. Leo Oppenheim translated the letter as follows in 1967:

Tell the lady Zinu: Iddin-Sin sends the following message:
May the gods Shamash, Marduk and Ilabrat keep you forever in good health for my sake.
From year to year, the clothes of the young gentlemen here become better, but you let my clothes get worse from year to year. Indeed, you persisted in making my clothes poorer and more scanty. At a time when in our house wool is used up like bread, you have made me poor clothes. The son of Adad-iddinam, whose father is only an assistant of my father, has two new sets of clothes, while you fuss even about a single set of clothes for me. In spite of the fact that you bore me and his mother only adopted him, his mother loves him, while you, you do not love me!

== History and context ==
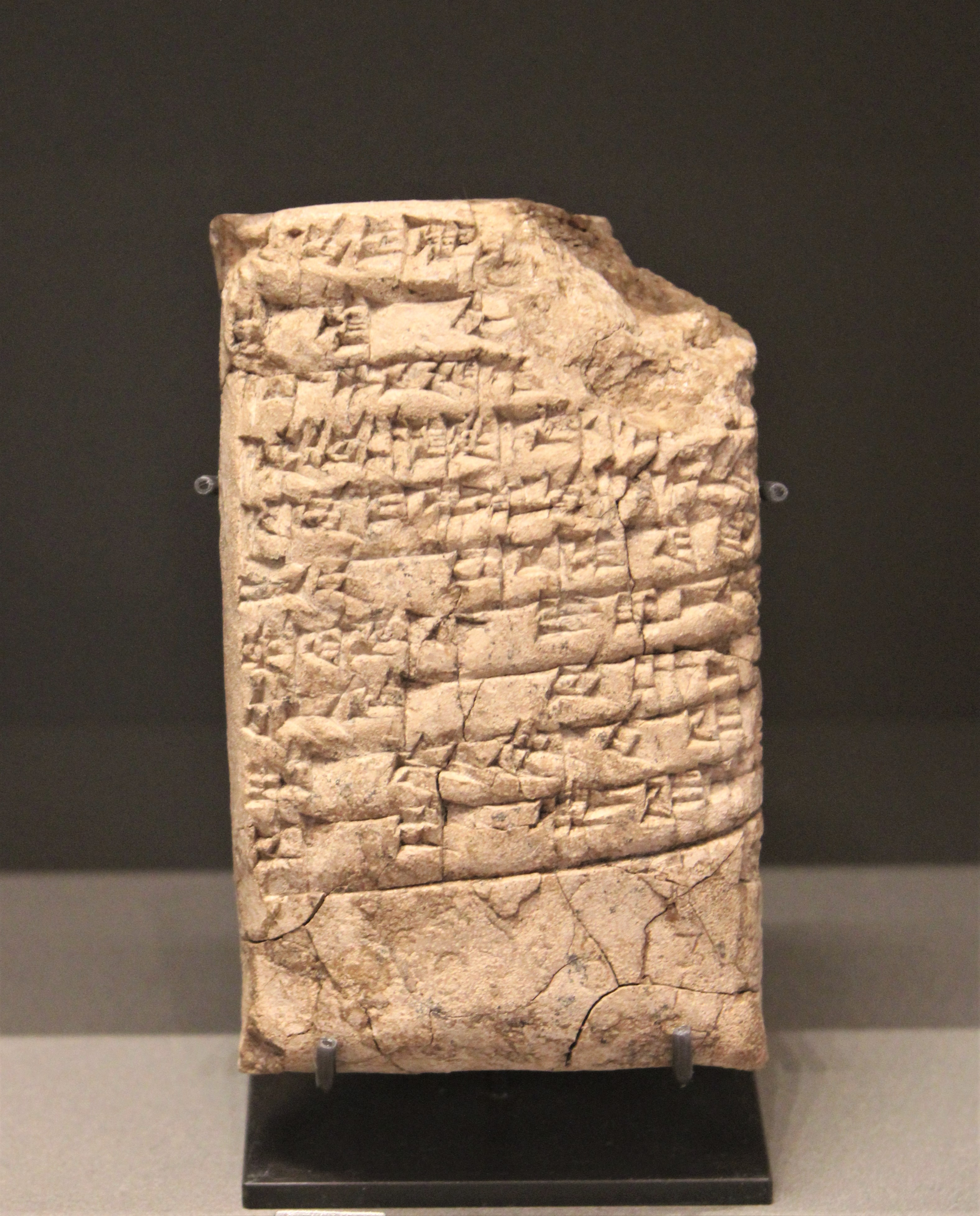
A letter from the Babylonian king Hammurabi to Iddin-Sin's father Shamash-hazir

Iddin-Sin's letter was written in the Old Babylonian Empire in the 18th century BC around the time of Hammurabi's reign (c. 1792–1750 BC). Iddin-Sin and his mother were members of the upper class in the city of Larsa as the son and wife, respectively, of Shamash-hazir, a high official in the city's administration under Hammurabi.

It was customary during this time not only for boys who wished to become priests or scribes, but also sons of public officials, to attend boarding schools where they could study cuneiform and literature. Because little context is given in the letter, it is not clear why Iddin-Sin was living away from home, but he is frequently assumed to have been such a student. Iddin-Sin was concerned with the quality of his clothes vis-à-vis those of his friends; just like today, his status was based, at least in part, on appearing to be wealthy. Though he was away from home, his mother still provided him with clothes. In need of new clothes, Iddin-Sin in the letter attempted to use various methods to make his mother, who was in charge of the household budget, feel guilty for not sending new clothes.

The letter shows that Zinu made Iddin-Sin's clothes from scratch; she had the wool in the house and had to spin, weave, dye and tailor it, a process that could take three months for clothes of regular quality and up to a whole year for finer quality garments. Zinu probably bought the wool herself at a local market, where it was sold by shepherds. Iddin-Sin likely addressed his mother because spinning and weaving in Mesopotamia was usually done by women, though there were exceptions.

Whether Iddin-Sin wrote the letter himself or dictated it to a scribe is not clear. The standard opening "Iddin-Sin sends the following message" suggests dictation but the script used in the letter is somewhat clumsy, with the language used showing mistakes expected of an inexperienced writer and perhaps colloquial speech. The entire message also did not quite fit on the tablet; after writing on both the front and back, the author wrote on the left edge, but again ran out of room, so that the last line of the letter spills over to the lower edge. The standard passage "Tell the lady Zinu" derives from the fact that another scribe would read it aloud for Zinu when she received the letter. The passage mentioning various gods and hoping they would keep Zinu in good health was also a standard passage; almost all letters written during this time began with the hope that the gods would bless the recipient's health.

The letter and its text were first published in 1934 by the Belgian archaeologist Georges Dossin. It is today kept in the Louvre in Paris.

== Commentary ==
The letter is often used as an example of documents that provide glimpses into everyday life in ancient Mesopotamia. The Assyriologist Jørgen Læssøe referred to it as "extremely human". The Assyriologist Rivkah Harris considered the letter to "vividly capture the spirit of a clever and manipulative child who is already something of a 'clothes-horse'". The historian Don Nardo wrote concerning the letter that "It proves that modern students' concerns about looking fashionable in school are nothing new". The historian William H. Stiebling Jr. considered the letter an example showcasing that "human nature has not changed very much since antiquity", with the letter evidencing competition between peers to have the best clothes and jewelry, and further concluded that "children's whiny attempts to manipulate their parents have not changed over the ages".

The historian Stephen Bertman characterized the letter as humorous and Iddin-Sin as spoiled. Using the letter from Iddin-Sin to Zinu, alongside two other personal letters, as examples, Bertman in 2003 reflected on why ancient personal writings can have such a potent effect: "Curiously, in one way or another, they all treat the subject of material possession. Therein perhaps lies the secret of their potency: as we read the letters we realize that the fragile things that mattered most to the writers are, like the writers themselves, no more, even as we ourselves and the things we cherish will someday cease to exist".
