= Larsa =

City-state in ancient Sumer

- 𒌓𒀕𒆠 (Sumerian)
- Location within Iraq
- 31°17′9″N 45°51′13″E
- Type: Settlement
- Location: Tell as-Senkereh, Dhi Qar Governorate, Iraq
- Region: Mesopotamia

Mesopotamia in the time of Hammurabi

Larsa (Sumerian: 𒌓𒀕𒆠, romanized: UD.UNUG^{KI}, read Larsam^{ki}), also referred to as Larancha/Laranchon (Gk. Λαραγχων) by Berossos and connected with the biblical Ellasar, was an important city-state of ancient Sumer, the center of the cult of the sun god Utu with his temple E-babbar. It lies some 25 km (16 mi) southeast of Uruk in Iraq's Dhi Qar Governorate, near the east bank of the Shatt-en-Nil canal at the site of the modern settlement Tell as-Senkereh or Sankarah.

Larsa is thought to be the source of a number of tablets involving Babylonian mathematics, including the Plimpton 322 tablet that contains patterns of Pythagorean triples.

== History ==
Larsa is found (as UD.UNUG) on Proto-cuneiform lexical lists from the Uruk 4 period (late 4th millennium BC). A few Proto-cuneiform tablets were also found there. Three Neolithic clay tokens, from a slightly early period, were also found at Larsa. For most of its history Larsa was primarily a cult site for the god Utu. In the early part of the 2nd millennium BC the First Dynasty of Lagash made it a major power for perhaps two centuries. The last known occupation was in the Hellenistic period.

=== Early Bronze Age ===
==== Early Dynastic IIIB ====
The historical "Larsa" was already in existence as early as the reign of Early Dynastic ruler Eannatum of Lagash (circa 2500–2400 BC), who annexed it to his empire. In a large victory stele found at Girsu he wrote:

"... E-anatum was very clever indeed and he made up the eyes of two doves with kohl, and adorned their heads with cedar (resin). For the god Utu, master of vegetation, in the E-babbar at Larsa, he had them offered as sacrificial bulls."

A later ruler, Entemena, nephew of Eannatum, is recorded on a foundation cone found at nearby Bad-Tibira as cancelling the debts of the citizens of Larsa "He cancelled [oblig]ations for the citizens of Uruk, Larsa, and Pa-tibira ... He restored (the second) to the god Utu’s control in Larsa ...".

==== Akkadian period ====
Larsa is attested in the Akkadian Empire in the Temple Hymns of Enheduanna, daughter of Sargon of Akkad.

"... Your lord is the soaring sunlight, the ruler ... righteous voice. He lights up the horizon, he lights up the zenith of heaven. Utu, lord of the Shining House, has built a home in your holy court, House of Larsa, and has taken his seat upon your throne."

==== Ur III period ====
In the Ur III empire period that ended the millennium, its first ruler Ur-Nammu recorded, in a brick inscription found at Larsa, rebuilding the E-babbar temple of Utu there.

=== Middle Bronze Age ===
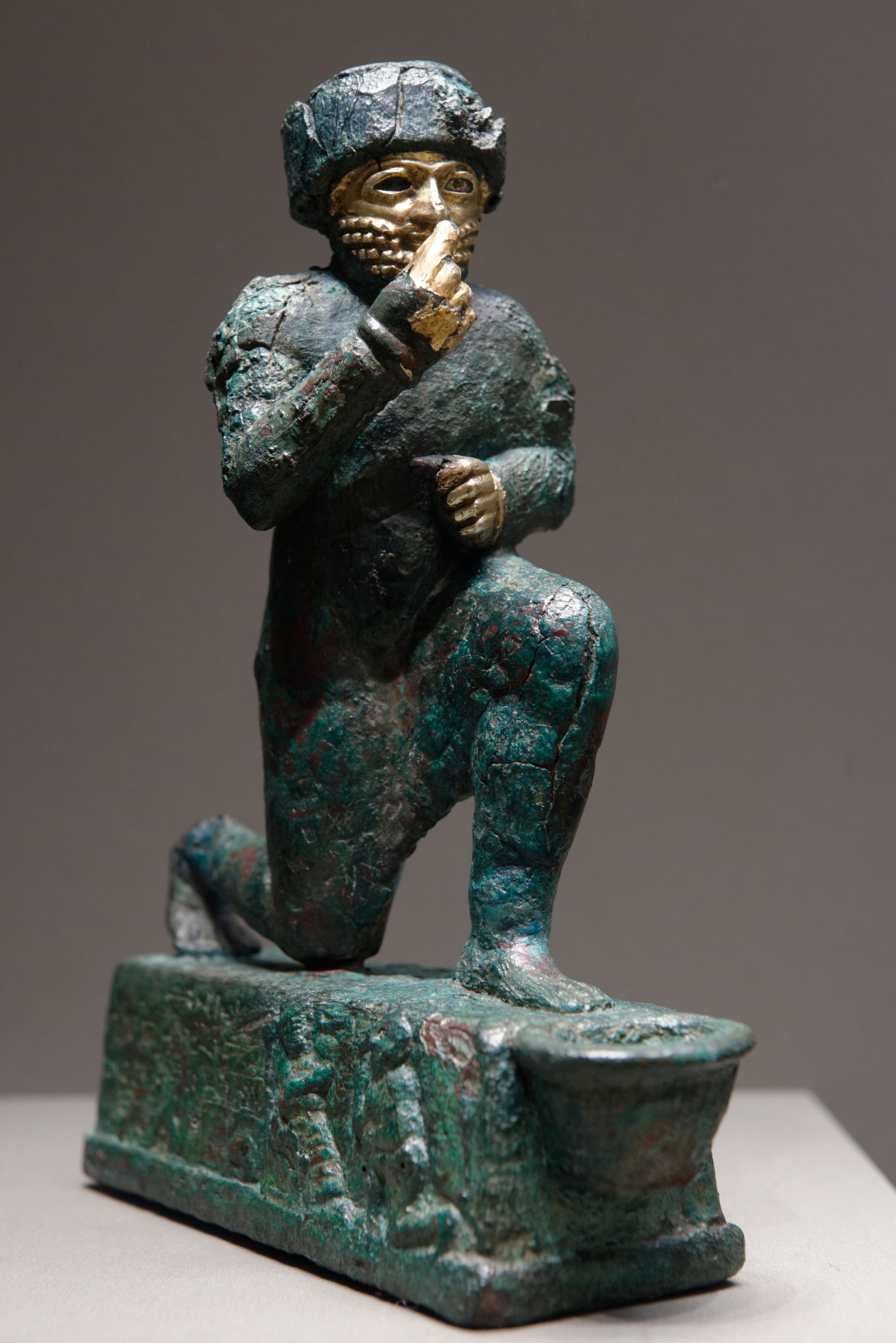
The Worshipper of Larsa, a votive statuette dedicated to the god Amurru for Hammurabi's life, early 2nd millennium BC, Louvre

The city became a political force during the Isin-Larsa period. After the Third Dynasty of Ur collapsed c. 2004 BC, Ishbi-Erra, an official of the last king of the Third Dynasty of Ur, Ibbi-Sin, relocated to Isin and set up a government which purported to be the successor to the Third Dynasty of Ur. From there, Ishbi-Erra recaptured Ur as well as the cities of Uruk and Lagash, which Larsa was subject to. Subsequent rulers of Isin appointed governors to rule over Larsa; one such governor was an Amorite named Gungunum. He eventually broke with Isin and established an independent dynasty in Larsa. To legitimize his rule and deliver a blow to Isin, Gungunum captured the city of Ur. In his year names he recorded the defeat of the distant Anshan in Elam as well as city-states closer to Larsa such as Malgium. As the region of Larsa was the main center of trade via the Persian Gulf, Isin lost an enormously profitable trade route, as well as a city with much cultic significance.

Gungunum's two successors, Abisare (c. 1905–1894 BC) and Sumuel (c. 1894–1865 BC), both took steps to cut Isin completely off from access to canals. Isin quickly lost political and economic influence.

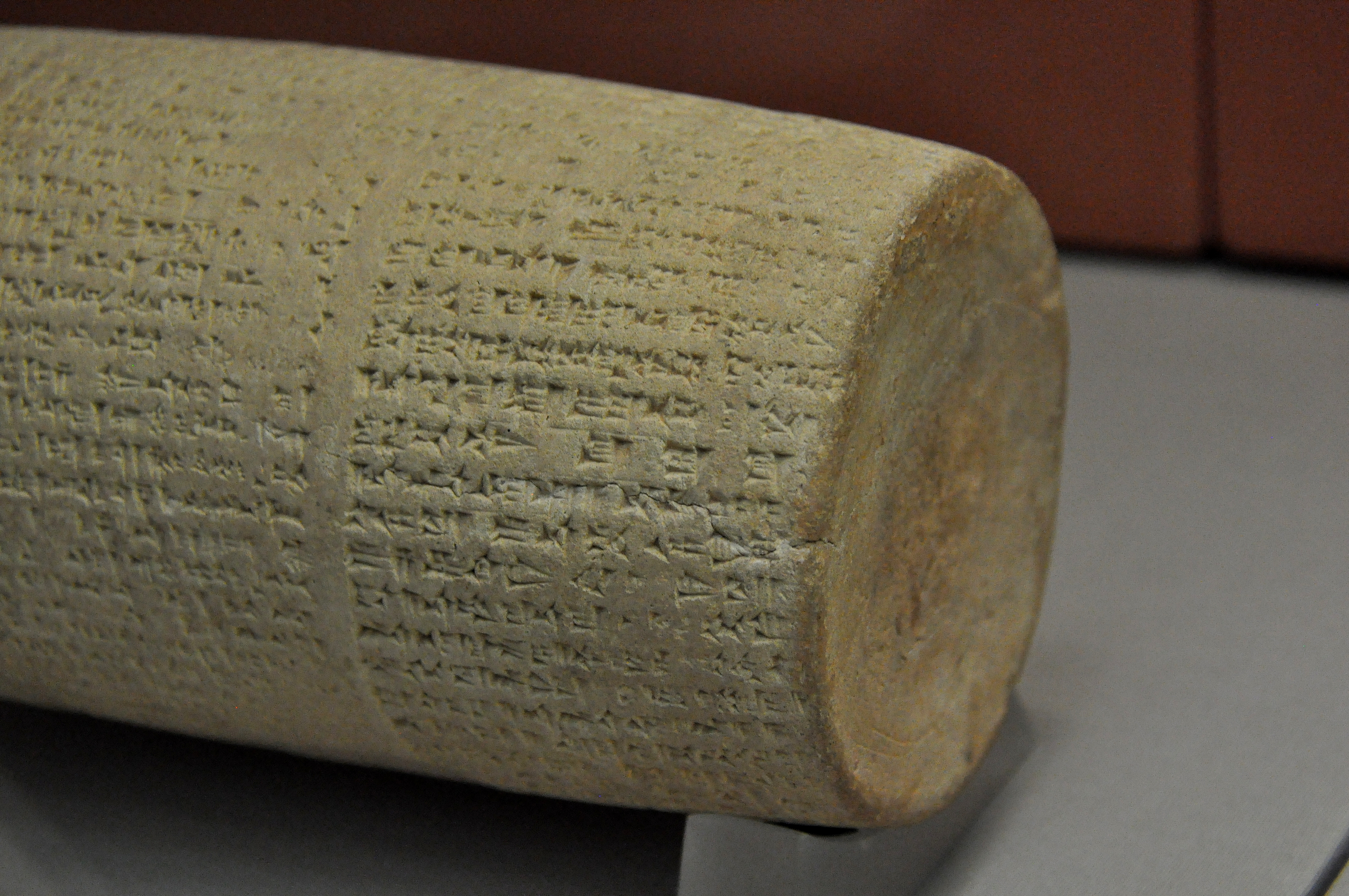
Detail of a terracotta cylinder of Nabonidus, recording the restoration work on the temple of Shamash at Larsa. Dated to 555–539 BC. Probably from Larsa, Iraq. Housed in the British Museum

Larsa grew powerful, but never accumulated a large territory. At its peak under king Rim-Sin I (c. 1822–1763 BC), Larsa controlled about 10–15 other city-states. In the latter half of this period the city of Mashkan-shapir acted as a second capital of the city-state. Nevertheless, huge building projects and agricultural undertakings can be detected archaeologically. After the defeat of Rim-Sin I by Hammurabi of Babylon, Larsa became a minor site, though it has been suggested that it was the home of the First Sealand Dynasty of Babylon.

=== Iron Age ===
Larsa was known to be active during the Neo-Babylonian, Achaemenid, and Hellenistic periods based on building brick inscriptions as well as a number of cuneiform texts from the Larsa temple of Samash which were found in Uruk. The E-babbar of Utu/Shamash was destroyed by fire in the 2nd century BC and the area re-used for poorly built private homes. The entire site was abandoned by the 1st century BC.

== List of rulers ==
The following list should not be considered complete:

#	Portrait or inscription	Ruler	Approx. date and length of reign	Comments, notes, and references for mentions
Ur III period (c. 2119 – c. 2004 BC)
1st		Naplanum	r. c. 2025 – c. 2005 BC (MC) r. c. 1961 – c. 1940 BC (SC)	temp. of Ibbi-Suen; temp. of Ishbi-Erra; May have been an Amorite of the Yamutbal tribe
Isin-Larsa period (c. 2004 – c. 1787 BC)
2nd		Emisum	r. c. 2004 – c. 1977 BC (MC) r. c. 1940 – c. 1912 BC (SC)	Son of Naplanum (?); temp. of Shu-Ilishu
3rd		Samium 𒊓𒈪𒌝	r. c. 1976 – c. 1942 BC (MC) r. c. 1912 – c. 1877 BC (SC)	Son of Emisum (?); temp. of Iddin-Dagan
4th		Zabaia	r. c. 1941 – c. 1933 BC (MC) r. c. 1877 – c. 1868 BC (SC)	Son of Samium; temp. of Ishme-Dagan; "Zabaya, Chief of the Amorites, son of Samium, rebuilt the Ebabbar"
5th		Gungunum 𒀭𒄖𒌦𒄖𒉡𒌝	r. c. 1932 – c. 1906 BC (MC) r. c. 1868 – c. 1841 BC (SC) (29 years)	Son of Zabaia (?); temp. of Lipit-Eshtar; Gained independence from Isin; Held the title of, "King"
6th		Abisare 𒀀𒉈𒊓𒊑𒂊	r. c. 1905 – c. 1895 BC (MC) r. c. 1841 – c. 1830 BC (SC) (11 years)	Son of Gungunum (?); temp. of Ur-Ninurta; Held the title of, "King"
7th	Votive dog in the name of Sumuel. Louvre AO4349	Sumuel 𒋢𒈬𒀭	r. c. 1894 – c. 1866 BC (MC) r. c. 1830 – c. 1801 BC (SC) (27 years)	Son of Abisare (?); temp. of Bur-Suen; Held the title of, "King"
8th		Nur-Adad	r. c. 1865 – c. 1850 BC (MC) r. c. 1801 – c. 1785 BC (SC) (15 years)	temp. of Sumu-la-El; Held the title of, "King"
9th		Sin-Iddinam 𒀭𒂗𒍪𒄿𒁷𒈾𒄠	r. c. 1849 – c. 1843 BC (MC) r. c. 1785 – c. 1778 BC (SC) (7 years)	Son of Nur-Adad; temp. of Enlil-bani; Held the title of, "King"
10th		Sin-Eribam 𒋢𒈬𒀭	r. c. 1842 – c. 1841 BC (MC) r. c. 1778 – c. 1776 BC (SC) (2 years)	Son of Ga’eš-rabi; temp. of Zambiya; Held the title of, "King of Sumer and Akkad"
11th		Sin-Iqisham 𒀭𒂗𒍪𒄿𒆠𒊭𒄠	r. c. 1840 – c. 1836 BC (MC) r. c. 1776 – c. 1771 BC (SC) (5 years)	Son of Sin-Eribam; temp. of Iter-pisha; Held the title of, "King"
12th		Silli-Adad	r. c. 1836 – c. 1835 BC (MC) r. c. 1771 – c. 1770 BC (SC) (less than 1 year)	Son of Sin-Iqisham (?); temp. of Sabium; d. c. 1835 BC; Held the title of, "King"
13th		Kudur-Mabuk 𒆪𒁺𒌨𒈠𒁍𒊌	r. c. 1835 – c. 1834 BC (MC) r. c. 1770 – c. 1754 BC (SC)	Son of Temti-Shilhak (?); May have come from an Elamite family; temp. of Naram-Sin
14th		Warad-Sin 𒀴𒀭𒂗𒍪	r. c. 1834 – c. 1823 BC (MC) r. c. 1770 – c. 1758 BC (SC) (12 years)	temp. of Ur-du-kuga; May have come from an Elamite family; Possible co-regency with his father (Kudur-Mabuk); Held the title of, "King"
15th		Rim-Sin I 𒀭𒊑𒅎𒀭𒂗𒍪	r. c. 1822 – c. 1763 BC (MC) r. c. 1758 – c. 1699 BC (SC) (60 years)	Brother of Warad-Sin (?); Defeated by Hammurabi of Babylon; Held the title of, "King of Sumer and Akkad"
#	Portrait or inscription	Ruler	Approx. date and length of reign	Comments, notes, and references for mentions
Old Babylonian period (c. 1763 – c. 1736 BC)
First dynasty of Babylon (c. 1763 – c. 1736 BC)
		Hammurabi 𒄩𒄠𒈬𒊏𒁉	r. c. 1763 – c. 1750 BC (MC) r. c. 1699 – c. 1686 BC (SC)	Son of Sin-Muballit; temp. of Zimri-Lim; Held the title of, "King of the Four Corners"
		Samsu-iluna 𒊓𒄠𒋢𒄿𒇻𒈾	r. c. 1750 – c. 1742 BC (MC) r. c. 1686 – c. 1678 BC (SC)	Son of Hammurabi; temp. of Siwe-Palar-Khuppak
16th		Rim-Sîn II 𒀭𒊑𒅎𒀭𒂗𒍪	r. c. 1742 – c. 1736 BC (MC) r. c. 1678 – c. 1674 BC (SC)	temp. of Samsu-iluna; Nephew of Rim-Sin I (?); Killed in revolt against Babylon; Held the title of, "King"

== Archaeology ==
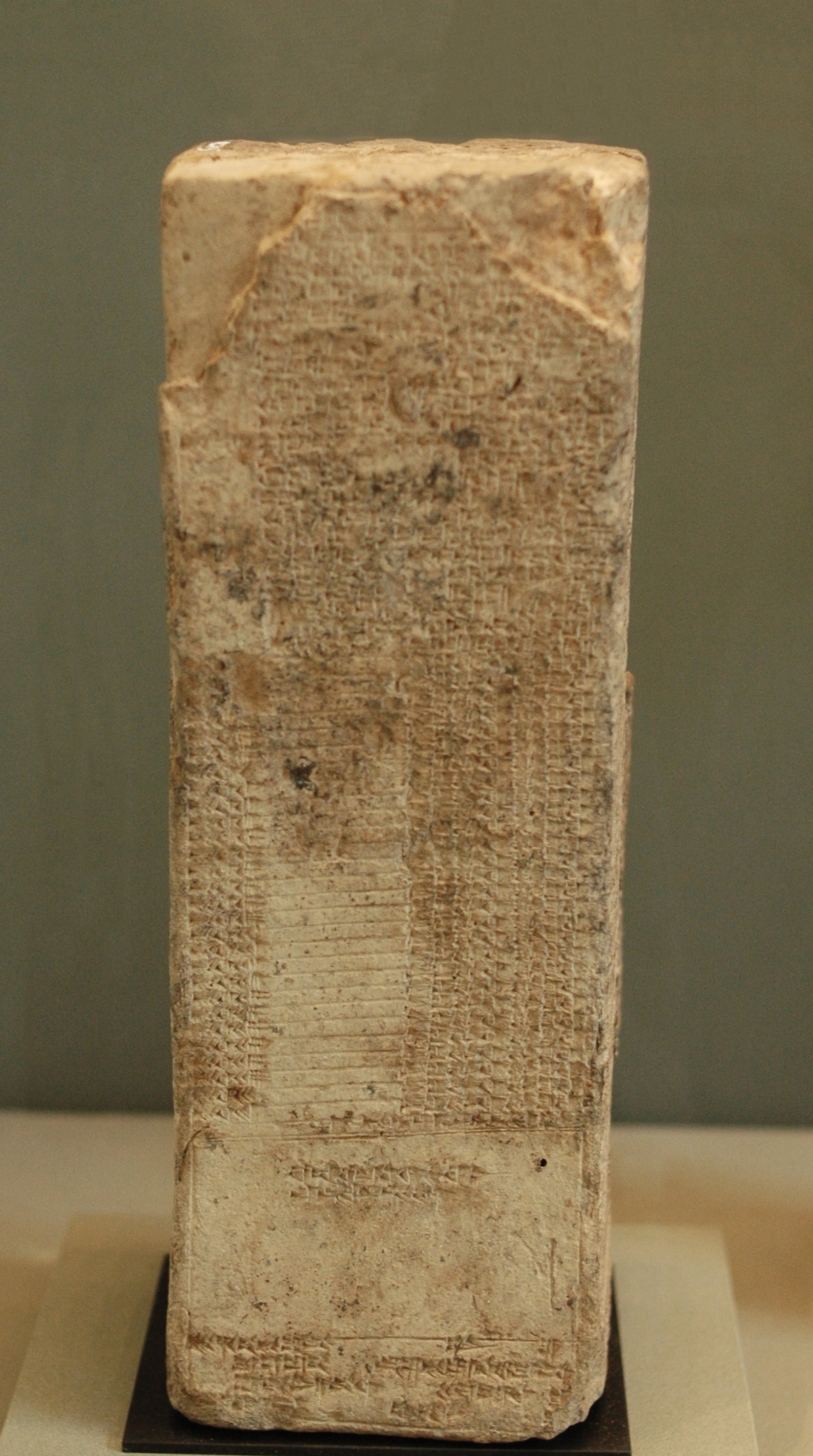
List of the kings of Larsa, 39th year of Hammurabi's reign, Louvre

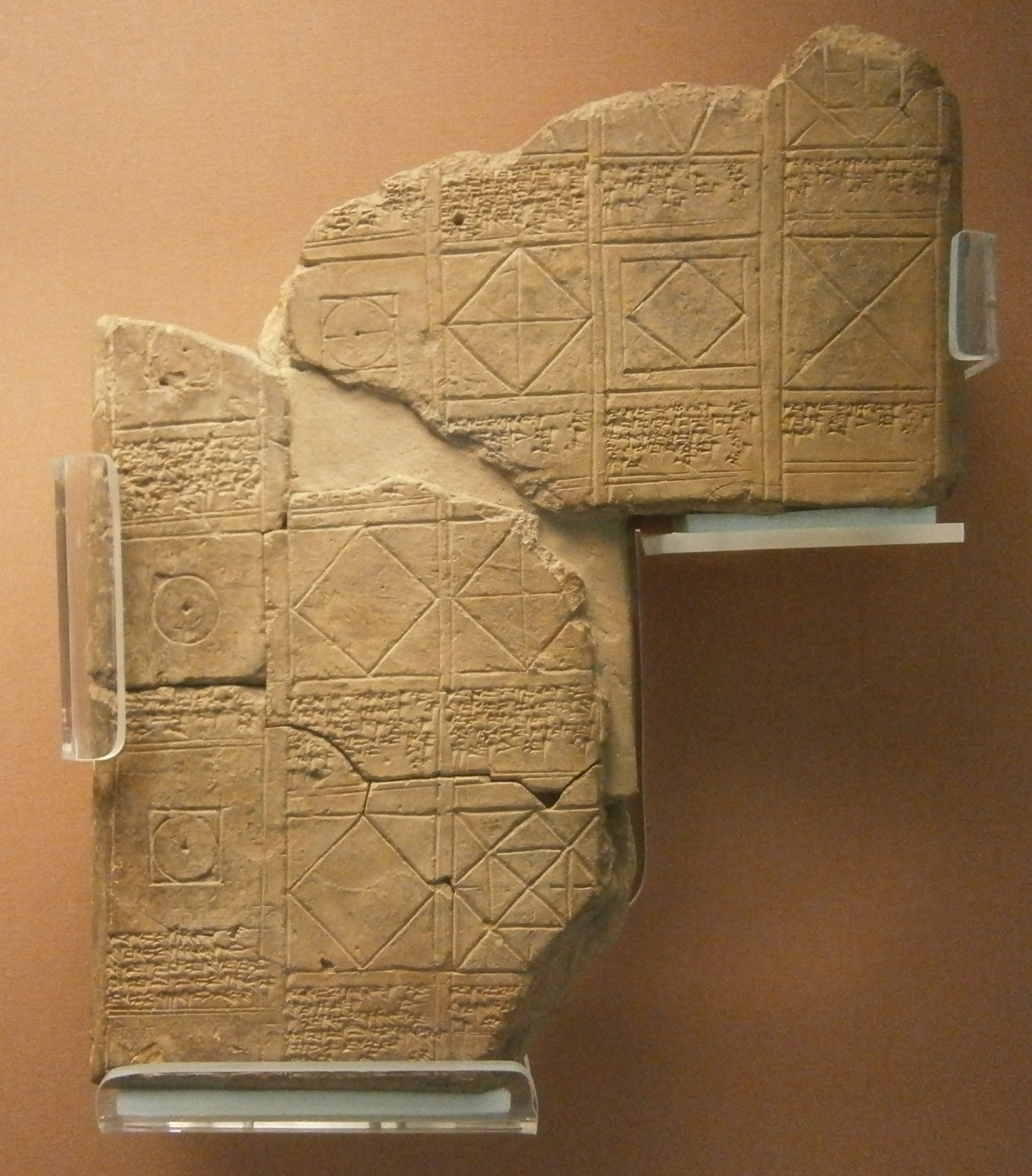
Compilation of plane geometry problems from Larsa, Old Babylonian period.

The remains of Larsa cover an area of about 200 hectares. The highest point is around 70 ft (21 m) in height.

The site of Tell es-Senkereh was first excavated, under the rudimentary archaeological standards of his day, by William Loftus in 1850 for less than a month. Loftus recovered building bricks of Nebuchadnezzar II of the Neo-Babylonian Empire which enabled the site's identification as the ancient city of Larsa. Much of the effort by Loftus was on the temple of Shamash, rebuilt by Nebuchadnezzar II. Inscriptions of Burna-Buriash II of the Kassite dynasty of Babylon and Hammurabi of the First Babylonian dynasty were also found. Larsa was also briefly worked by Walter Andrae in 1903. The site was inspected by Edgar James Banks in 1905. He found that widespread looting by the local population was occurring there.

The first modern, scientific, excavation of Senkereh occurred in 1933, with the work of André Parrot. Parrot worked at the location again in 1967. In 1969 and 1970, Larsa was excavated by Jean-Claude Margueron. Between 1976 and 1991, an expedition of the Delegation Archaeologic Francaise en Irak led by J-L. Huot excavated at Tell es-Senereh for 13 seasons. The primary focus of the excavation was the Neo-Babylonian E-Babbar temple of Utu/Shamash. Floors and wall repairs showed its continued use in the Hellenistic period. A tablet, found on the earliest Hellenistic floor, was dated to the reign of Philip Arrhidaeus (320 BC). Soundings showed that the Neo-Babylonian temple followed that plan of the prior Kassite and earlier temples. Numerous inscriptions and cuneiform tablets were found representing the reigns of numerous rulers, from Ur-Nammu to Hammurabi all the way up to Nebuchadnezzar II.

In 2019 excavations were resumed. The first season began with a topographic survey, by drone and surface survey, to refine and correct the mapping from early excavations. Excavation was focused on a large construction of the Hellenistic period built north of the E-Babbar temple. The first season included a magnetometer survey. Excavations continued with one month seasons in 2021 and 2022. They have been able to trace a very large system of internal canals and a port area, all linked to the Tigris and Euphrates rivers in Old Babylonian times. In a destroyed level of the Grand Viziers residence 59 cuneiform tablets, fragments and envelopes dated to the time of Gungunum and Abisare were found. Geophysical work continued including on the 10-20 meter wide rampart wall that enclosed Larsa, with six main gates. Magnetic surveys using a caesium gradiometer have discovered a massive baked brick water gate in the 15 meter wide mud brick wall on the western side. The gate permitted the passage of one of the large canals that passed through Larsa. A pedestrian gate was adjacent. Other portions of the 5376 meter long city wall (20 meters wide in places) were also surveyed and work this continues at the site.

== See also ==
- Cities of the ancient Near East
- Short chronology timeline
- Letter from Iddin-Sin to Zinu
- Tell Sifr
