= Sin-Eribam =

King of Ur (1842–1841 BC)

Sin-Eribam 𒋢𒈬𒀭

King of Larsa
- Reign: c. 1843 - c. 1841 BC
- Died: c. 1841 BC
- Issue: Sin-Iqisham
- Father: Ga’es-rabi

Sin-Eribam (𒋢𒈬𒀭; died c. 1841 BC) ruled the ancient Near East Amorite city-state of Larsa for only 2 years, from c. 1843 BC to c. 1841 BC (MC). He followed Sin-Iddinam as king. He was the son of the son of Ga’eš-rabi.

== See also ==
- Chronology of the ancient Near East
- List of Mesopotamian dynasties
