= Sin-Iddinam =

King of Larsa

Sîn-iddinam 𒀭𒂗𒍪𒄿𒁷𒈾𒄠

King of Larsa
- Reign: c. 1849-1843 BC (MC)
- Predecessor: Nur-Adad
- Successor: Sin-Eribam
- Died: c. 1843 BC
- Father: Nur-Adad

Location of Larsa

Sîn-iddinam ("Sîn gave to me") ruled the ancient Near East city-state of Larsa from c. 1849-1843 BC (MC). He was deified for all of his reign (name written as ^{d}suen-i-din-na-am). His father Nur-Adad had been deified late in his reign. His presumed regnal length of seven years is based on the Larsa King List (Larsa Date List) and there being 7 known year names. His royal epiphets included King of Sumer and Akkad, King of Larsa, and Provider of Ur (Larsa kings has used "King of Ur until his fater Nur-Adad). It has been suggested that Sîn-iddinam and his father Nur-Adad co-ruled for a time. Two letters of Sîn-iddinam indicate that the ascension of Nur-Adad followed a period of crisis in Larsa. One read "... House was turned against house. Battle was waged in its public square. Murder was committed by means of weapons. In all the streets ruin set in. Brother consumed brother. The troops who deserted perished by hunger or weapons. ...". It has been suggested that the disruption was due to Šimaškian incursions. Based on a later liver omen it has been suggested that Sîn-iddinam died suddenly when a stone slab fell on him.

Seven year names of Sîn-iddinam are known, notably:

- Year the foundations of (the temple) Ebabbar were laid
- Year the army of Babylon was smitten by weapons
- Year Ibrat the main city and Malgium and various others were seized
- Year the dwelling / the land of Eshnunna was destroyed
- Year the great city wall of Mashkan-shapir was built

His building work on the E-Babbar temple of Utu at Larsa is also recorded in a number of plaques and clay cones. His defeat of a Babylon army would have been roughly in the 43th year of Sumu-la-El of Babylon, c. 1847 BC. A large number of clay barrels of Sîn-iddinam commemorating the wall were found at Mashkan-shapir.

Sîn-iddinam concluded a treaty with Ibal-pi-El I of Eshnunna and Sîn-kāšid of Uruk against Sabium of Babylon and his ally Ikūn-pī-Sîn of Nerebtum.

A cache of tablets found at Tell Waresh 2, near Nippur some of which contained year names of Sîn-iddinam.

It is known that as late as the reign of Larsa ruler Rim-Sin (c. 1823-1763 BC) that there was a cult statue of Sîn-iddinam in the Nanna temple at the city of Ur which was still being annointed.

Sîn-iddinam is also known for a prayer to God Utu, whom he describes as "Father of the black-headed ones".

== See also ==
- Chronology of the ancient Near East
- List of Mesopotamian dynasties

== Gallery ==
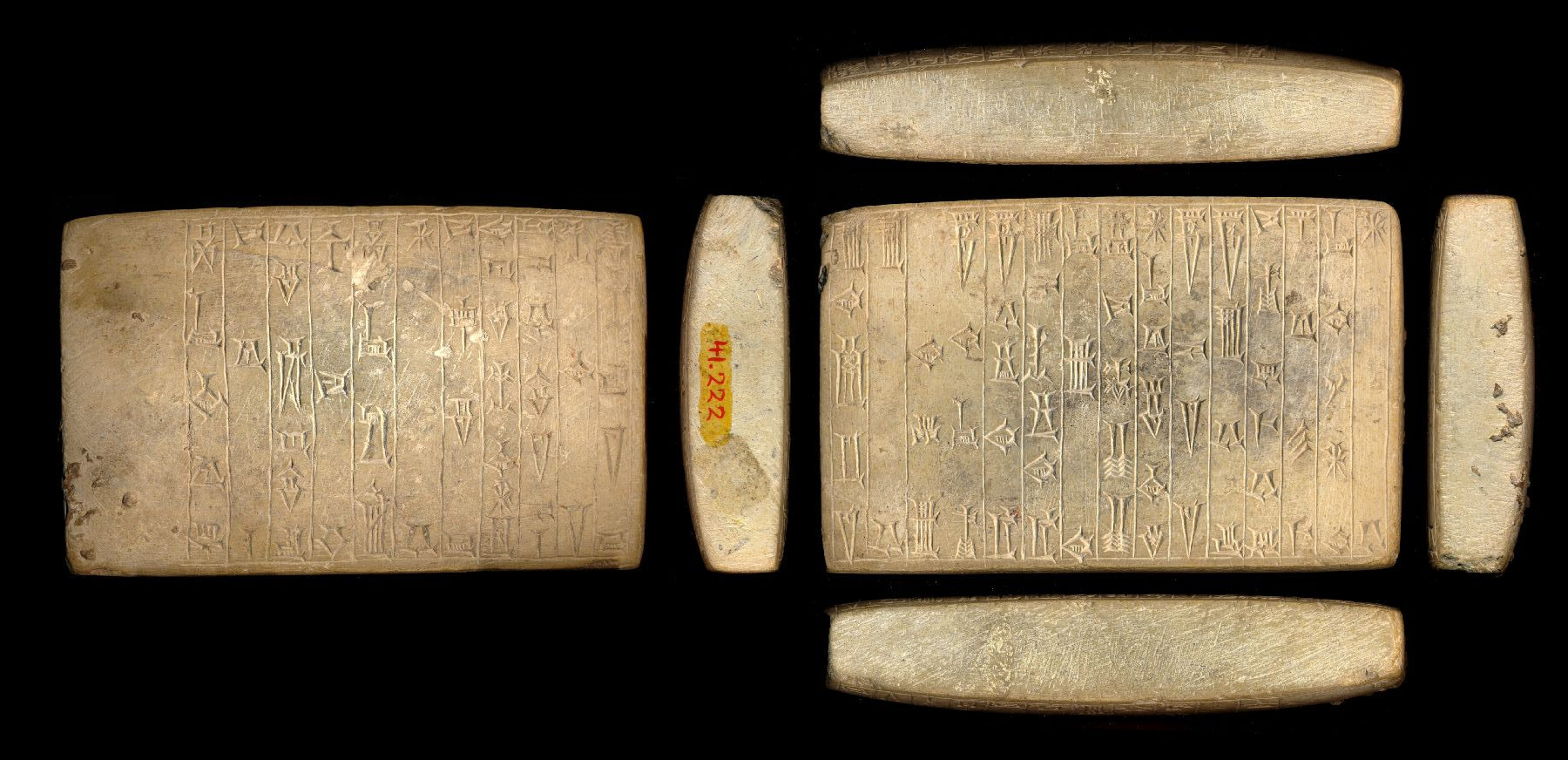
Dedication tablet of Sin-Iddinam. The name "Sin-Iddinam" is mentioned in the 7th column from the right.

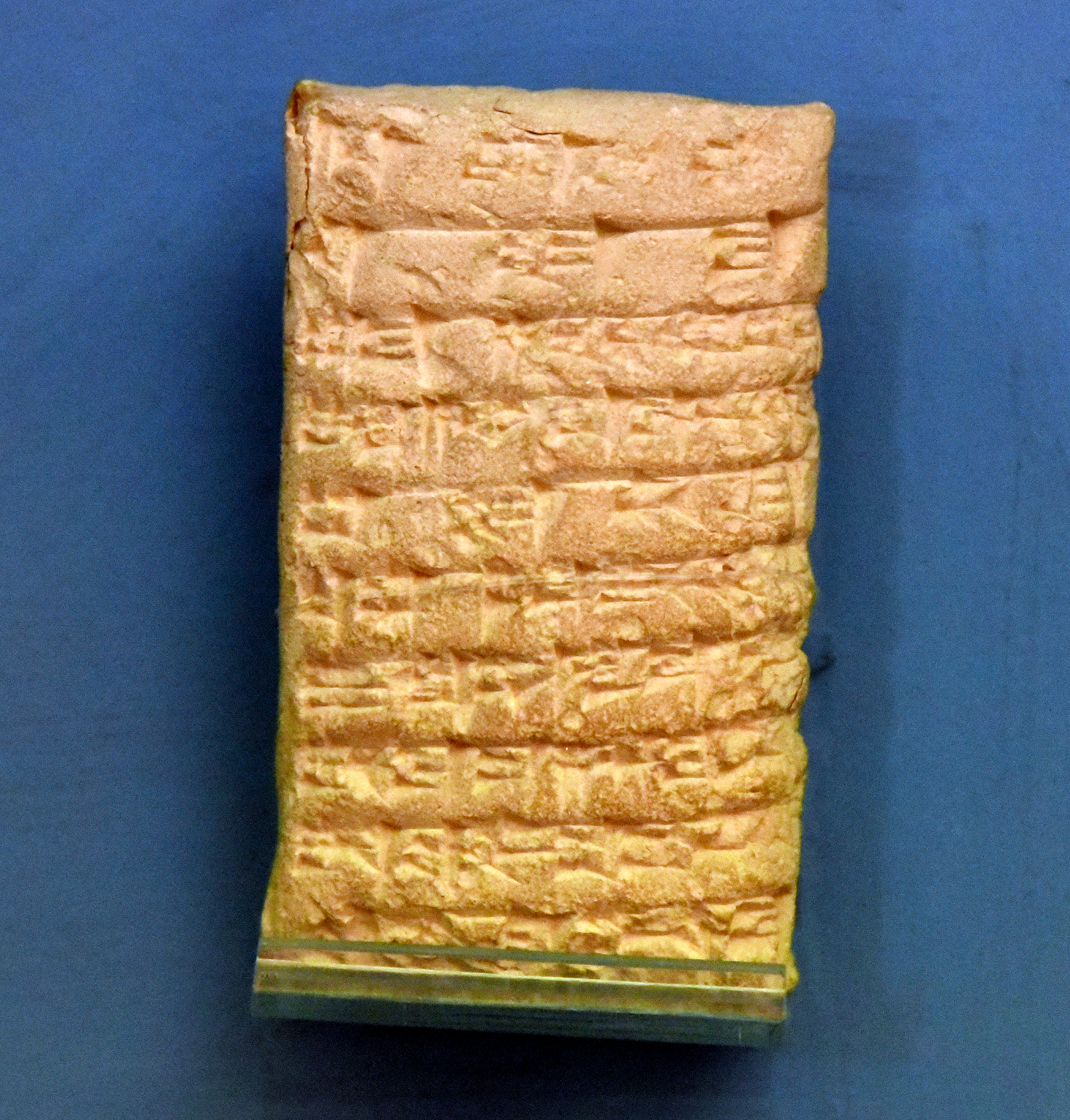
Letter from king Hammurabi to Sin-Idinnam, governor of Larsa. From Lagash, Iraq. 18th century BC. Ancient Orient Museum, Istanbul

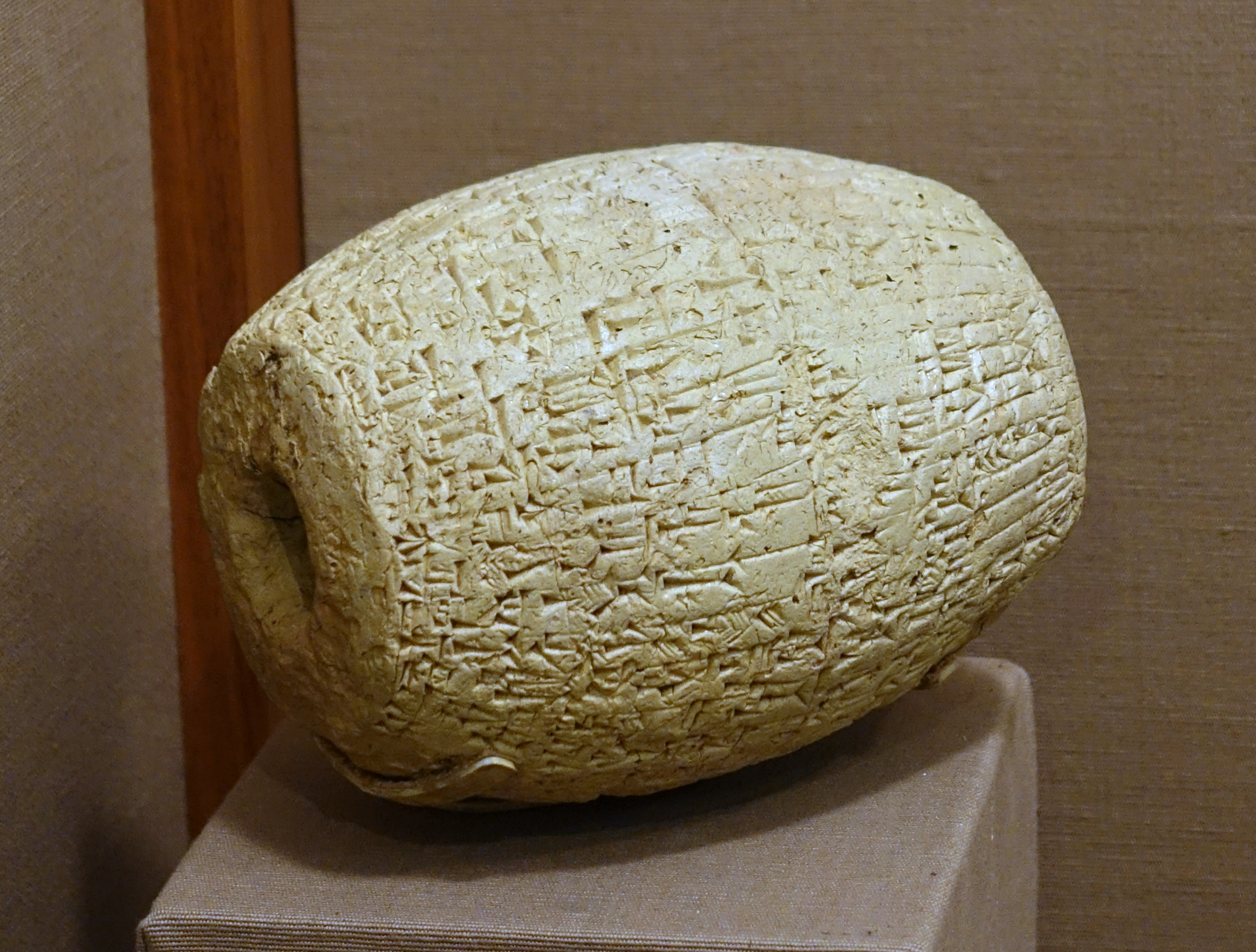
Irrigation works, Prism of King Sin-iddinam of Larsa, Isin-Larsa period, reign of Sin-iddinam, c. 1849-1843 BC, baked clay - Oriental Institute Museum, University of Chicago

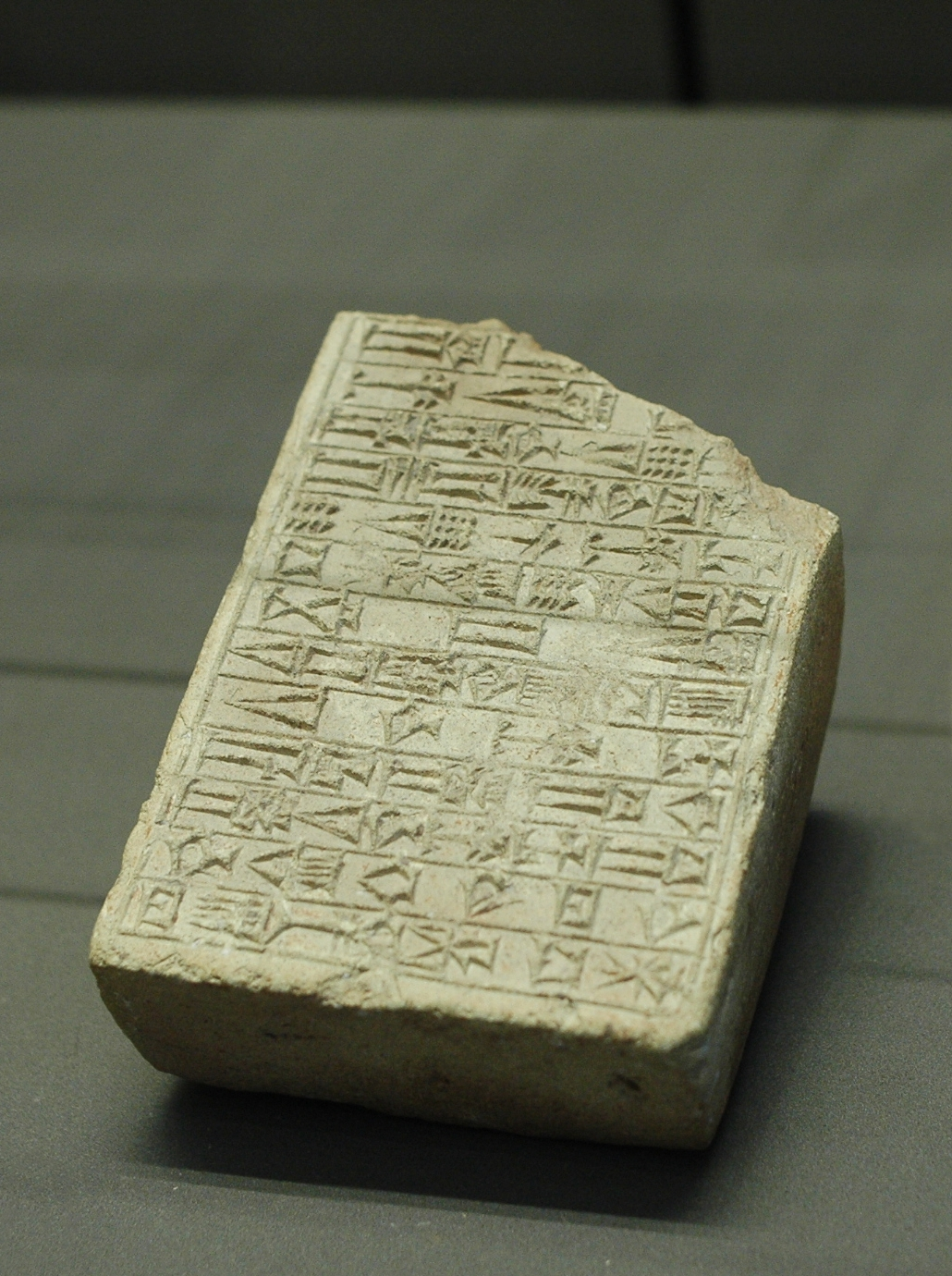
Stamping mold for the foundation bricks of the temple of the Sun-God Utu in Larsa. The inscription relates the construction of the Ebbabar ("the shining temple") by Sin-iddinam, king of Larsa.

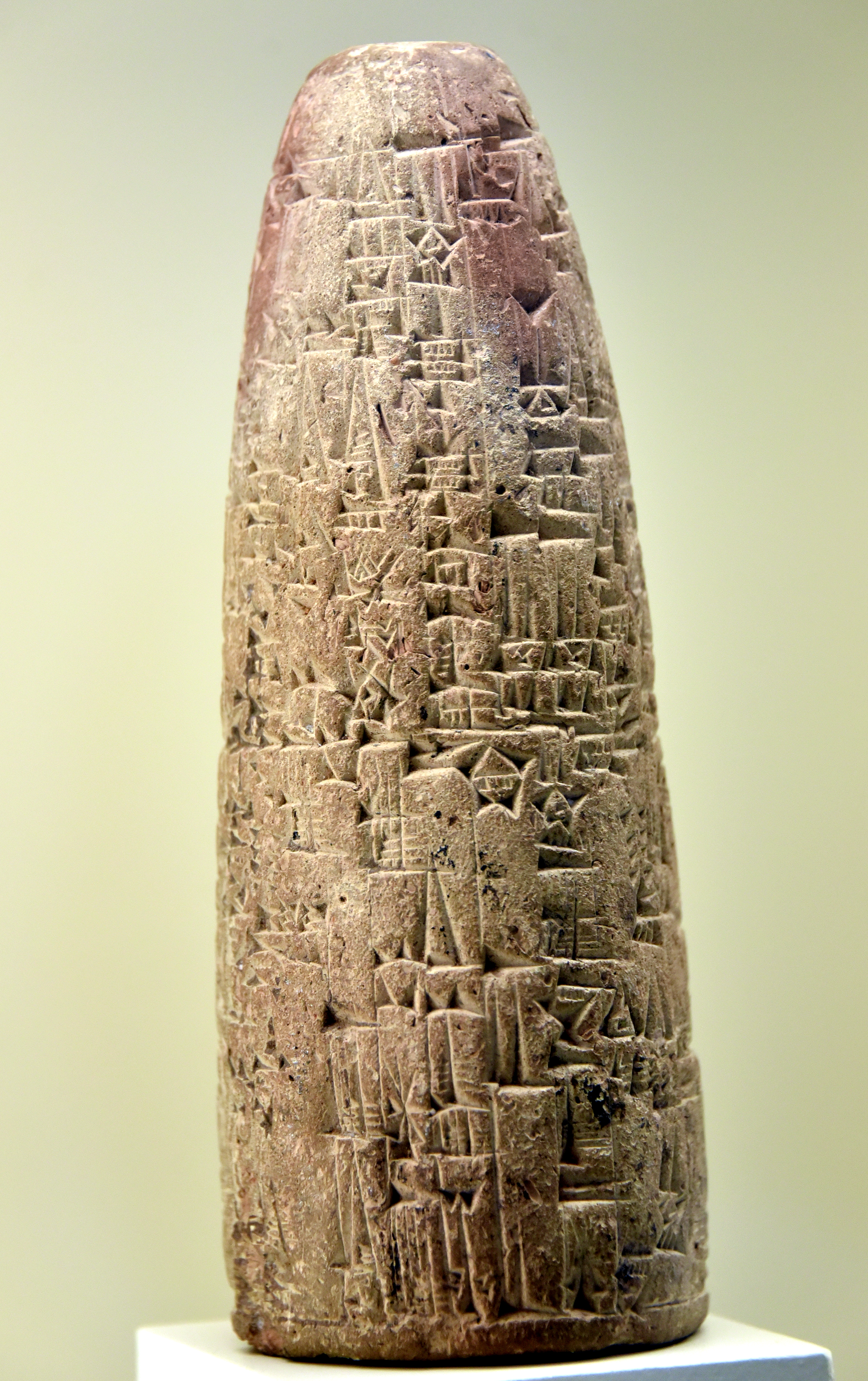
Inscribed clay cone of Sin-Iddinam, king of Larsa, c. 1849-1843 BC, from Iraq. Pergamon Museum.
