= Emisum =

Ancient ruler of Larsa from 2004 - 1977 BC

Ruler of Larsa
- Reign: c. 2004-1977 BC
- Died: c. 1977 BC

Location of Larsa

Emisum (Iemsium or Emisu) governed the ancient Near East city of Larsa c, 2004-1977 BC (MC). He was an Amorite.

== See also ==
- List of Mesopotamian dynasties
- Chronology of the ancient Near East
