= Samium =

Ruler of Larsa

Ruler of Larsa
- Reign: c. 1977 - c. 1941 BC
- Died: c. 1941 BC
- Issue: Zabaia

Location of Larsa

Samium governed the ancient Near Eastern city of Larsa c. 1976-1941 BC (MC). He was an Amorite. He had a son called Zabaia.

== See also ==
- Chronology of the ancient Near East
- List of Mesopotamian dynasties
