= Mashkan-shapir =

Coordinates: 32°13′42.7″N 45°18′24.5″E

- Tell Abu Duwari
- Location within Iraq
- Type: settlement
- Location: Iraq

Site notes
- Excavation dates: 1987-1990
- Archaeologists: Elizabeth Stone, Paul Zimansky
- Condition: Ruined
- Owner: Public
- Public access: Yes

Mashkan-shapir (Maškan-šāpir) (modern Tell Abu Duwari, Al Qadisyah Governorate, Iraq) was an ancient tell roughly 30 kilometres (19 mi) north of Nippur and around 90 miles (140 km) southeast of Baghdad. The city god of Mashkan-shapir was Nergal and a temple named Meslam dedicated to him was built there. It is about 20 kilometers south of ancient Malgium and about 30 kilometers from ancient Larsa. The remnants of a large watercourse, thought to be an ancient bed of the Tigris or Euphrates, pass close to the city.

== History ==
=== Chalcolithic ===
Thought occupied during the Ubaid period (based on clay sickle fragments) and Uruk period (based on pottery fragments).

=== Early Bronze Age ===
The town's first epigraphic appearance was during the Akkadian period in a in reference to an escaped slave.

"Lugal-azida, slave of Lugal-kigala, ran away from the governor; the slave woman of Ur-ni-gin disclosed his hiding place; he is (now) in Mashkan-shapir; he should be brought here!"

It was known during the Ur III period as a location for royal shepherds. A brick of Ur III ruler Amar-Sin (c. 2046-2037 BC) was also found at the site.

=== Middle Bronze Age ===
==== Larsa period ====
Mashkan-shapir achieved prominence during the Old Babylonian period. This time of occupation is considered to begin with the construction of the city walls by Sin-Iddinam of Larsa, known from an inscribed barrel cylinider found at the site.

"When the great lord, the hero Nergal, in his overflowing heart verily caused his city Mashkan-shapir to rise, (and) with his words that cannot be changed grandly decreed to erect its city wall in a virgin place (and) to expand its dwellings, then Sin-iddinam ... the wall of his city Mashkan-shapir, the pure place may raise its head, ... I made bricks (and built the city wall of them). The name of the great wall is “Nergal destroys the enemy lands for me.” ... At that time I strengthened the foundations of Mashkan-shapir, the sweet place ... (And when) I expanded its dwellings more than my royal predecessors (had done it before me), I excavated the canal in the midst of the city. Its population I provided with sweet water to drink. ..."

==== Old Babylonian period ====
After rising to importance under the Larsa city-state, Mashkan-shapir became part of the Babylonian empire after the defeat of Larsa by Hammurabi following a long siege. At the time, Babylon and Larsa were engaged in a struggle for dominance in the region.

The city was abandoned c. 1720 BC during the reign of Samsu-iluna, successor to Hammurabi of the First Babylonian dynasty.The city's demise was part of a general collapse and abandonment of sites in the region at that time.

=== Iron Age ===
==== Parthian period ====
It was not re-occupied until late in the first millennium, with a 5 hectare Parthian settlement developing on the southern portion of the site.

Note that the modern name of the site is in some doubt. Other possible names are Ishan Chebir and Tell Naim. The Tell Abu Duwari identification was the first and is used in archaeological publications.

== Archaeology ==
Babylonia at the time of Hammurabi, c. 1792-1750 BC

The site of Mashkan-shapir covers about 56 hectares (with 72 hectares within the city walls) being about 4 meters in elevation and it is divided into a four quarters by canals. The occupation is primarily Old Babylonian with the Ur III period occupation only having an area of about 5 hectares. It is especially important from an archaeological standpoint because it is a single level site. Most cities in the Ancient Near East have been built and rebuilt many times over history, obscuring our understanding of individual time periods.

Tell Abu Duwari was first noted, as site 639, in the Nippur survey of Robert McCormick Adams of the Oriental Institute at the University of Chicago. After visiting it in 1986 the site was excavated for a total of five months in three seasons between 1987 and 1990 by an American Schools of Oriental Research and National Geographic Society team led by Elizabeth Stone and Paul Zimansky. In addition to the temple of Nergal two graveyards were found, one Old Babylonian and one Parthian. Small finds included eleven cylinder seals, stone pendants, typical burial goods, weaponry artifacts including spear points and mace heads, model chariots related to Nergal, and a clay cone of the little known Larsa ruler Zabaia. Since these seasons were planned as preparation for a long term excavation very little full excavation occurred, work being mostly surface surveys and soundings (with one small excavation in the southeast sector). A key find was that of foundation deposits commemorating the city walls being built by Sin-Iddinam in c. 1844 BC, which allowed the city to be identified. As part of the work, satellite images were taken and a complete surface-mapping was made using a kite lofted camera and coordinate markers. From 2003 to 2011 additional satellite images of the site were obtained. Using these it was possible to identify the locations of canals, streets, and the palace. The palace was a large building, at least 50 meters by 50 meters in size.

Excavations at Mashkan-shapir ended with the invasion of Kuwait by Iraq in 1990, interrupting a planned long-term research program. Subsequently, the site has been heavily looted, especially in the central, western, and northern mounds, to the point where any further archaeological work would yield little results. As of 2010 the southern mound, holding the temple of Nergal, was still relatively unlooted but its current status is unknown.

== See also ==
- Cities of the ancient Near East
