= Sumuel =

Amorite King of Larsa

Sumuel 𒋢𒈬𒀭

King of Larsa
- Reign: c. 1895 - c. 1866 BC
- Died: c. 1866 BC

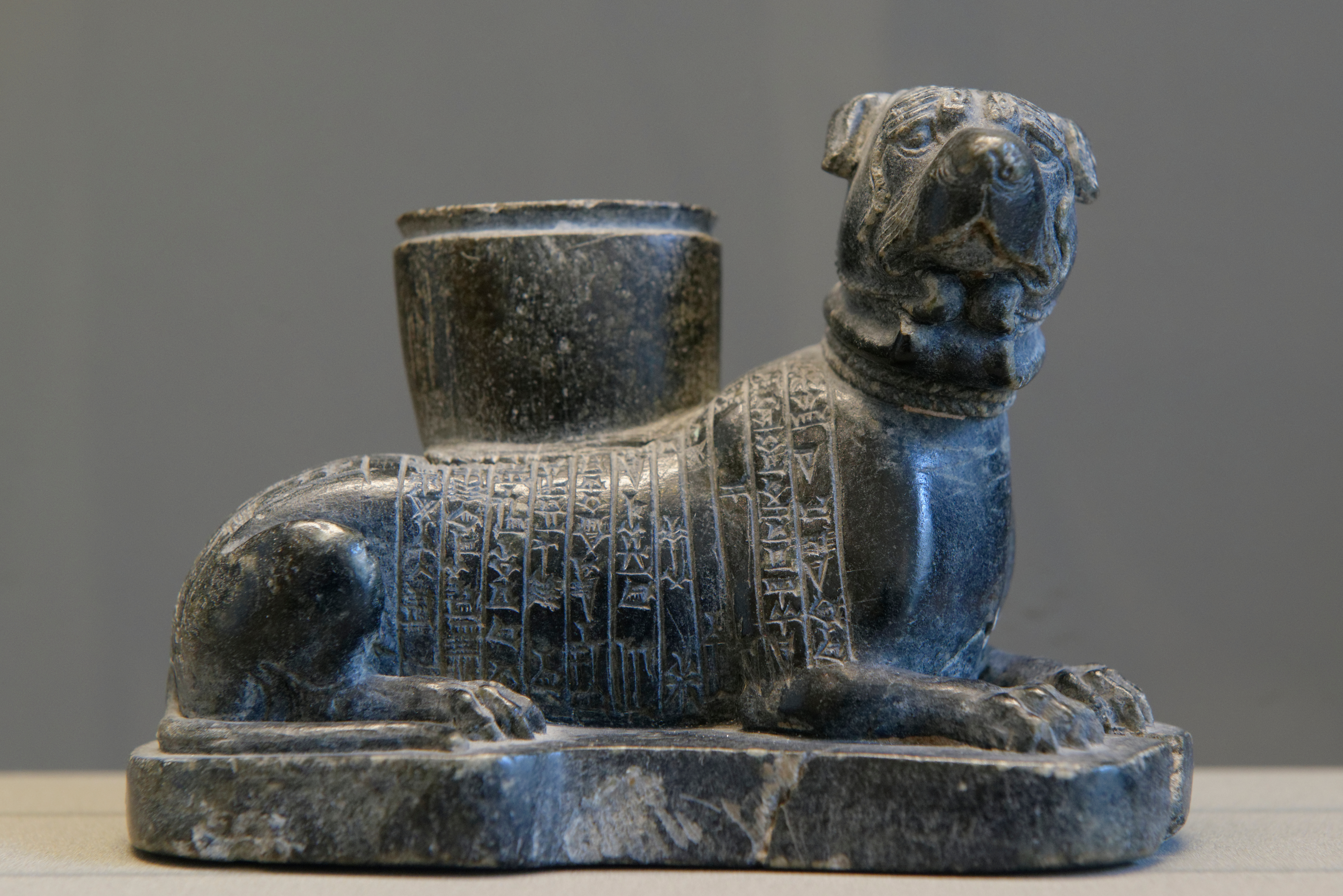
Votive statuette of a dog, dedicated by a doctor from Lagash to the goddess Ninisina, for the life of "Sûmû-El, king of Ur". Musée du Louvre.

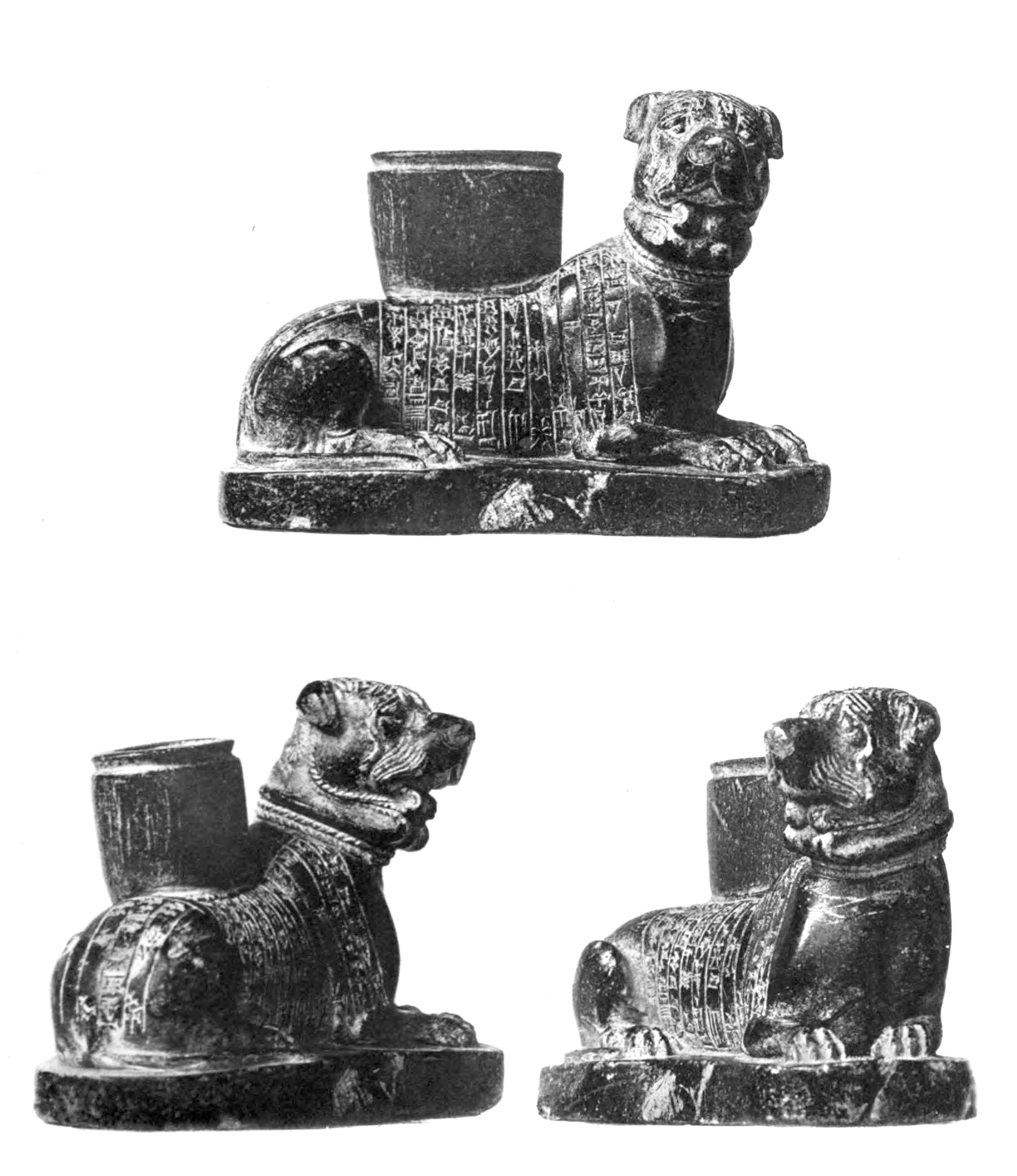
The dog of Sumuel, at time of discovery

Sumuel or Sumu-El (𒋢𒈬𒀭, su-mu-el3; died c. 1866 BC) was the Amorite King of Larsa, a city-state in Sumer, in southern Mesopotamia, from c. 1895-1866 BC (MC).

His daughter was Enshakiag-Nanna who became en-priestess at Ur c. 1872-1832 BC.

== Reign ==
Annals for his complete 29-year reign have survived. He was preceded by Abisare.

He campaigned against Akusum and Kazallu in his year 4, Uruk in year 5, Pinaratim in year 8, Sabum in year 10, Kish in year 11, Kazallu in year 15, Nanna-Isha in 16, and Umma at the end of his reign. Most of these seem to be names of small villages along the Euphrates.

Sumuel is known from several inscriptions.

== See also ==
- Chronology of the ancient Near East
- List of Mesopotamian dynasties
