= Abisare =

Ancient ruler of the city-state of Larsa

King of Larsa
- Reign: c. 1906 - c. 1895 BC
- Died: c. 1895 BC

Abisare (Abī-sārê; died c. 1895 BC) was a ruler of the ancient Near East city-state of Larsa. He was an Amorite. The annals of his 11-year reign record that he smote the city of Isin in his 9th regnal year.

An inscribed clay cone of Abī-sārê read:

"For Nanna, his master, Abī-sārê, strong man, king of Ur, the city wall of Iškun-Sîn built and restored."

== See also ==
- Chronology of the ancient Near East
- List of Mesopotamian dynasties
