= Marduk =

National god of the Babylonians

- God of Babylon; God of Creation, water, agriculture, justice, medicine, and magic
- 9th-century BC depiction of the Statue of Marduk, with his servant dragon Mušḫuššu. This was Marduk's main cult image in Babylon.
- Abode: Babylon
- Planet: Jupiter
- Symbol: mušḫuššu, spade

Genealogy
- Parents: Enki and Damgalnuna
- Siblings: Ninsar, Ninkurra, Uttu, Ninti
- Consort: Sarpanit
- Children: Nabu

Equivalents
- Greek: Zeus
- Roman: Jupiter
- Egyptian: Amen or Ra

Marduk (/ˈmɑːrdʊk/; cuneiform: 𒀭𒀫𒌓 ^{d}AMAR.UTU; Sumerian: amar utu.k "calf of the sun; solar calf"; Hebrew: מְרֹדַךְ, Modern: Merōdaḵ, Tiberian: Mərōḏaḵ) was a god from ancient Mesopotamia, patron deity of Babylon. First sparsely attested in the 3rd millennium BC, Marduk slowly rose to prominence before being enshrined as leader of the Mesopotamian pantheon under Nebuchadnezzar I in the 2nd millennium BC. In Babylon, Marduk was worshipped in the Esagila temple.

Believed to have originated as an underworld god, a storm god or an agriculture deity, Marduk came to be worshipped as a god of creation, justice, water, agriculture, magic and medicine. His symbol was the spade and he was associated with the Mušḫuššu. By the 1st millennium BC, Marduk had become astrologically associated with the planet Jupiter. He was a prominent figure in Babylonian cosmology, especially in the Enūma Eliš creation myth.

At the conclusion of the Enuma Elish (Tablet VII), Marduk is bestowed with around fifty names and titles by the assembly of gods. These epithets celebrate his authority, divine acts and supreme status over the Mesopotamian pantheon.

== Name and etymology ==
The name Marduk was solely spelled as ^{d}AMAR.UTU in the Old Babylonian Period, although other spellings such as MES and ^{d}ŠA.ZU were also in use since the Kassite Period. In the 1st millennium BC, the ideograms ^{d}ŠU and KU were regularly used. The logogram for Adad is also occasionally used to spell Marduk.

Texts from the Old Babylonian period support the spelling Marutu or Marutuk, with the shortened spelling Martuk or Marduk attested starting from the Kassite period. His name in Hebrew, Merodak, supports the longer version, and First Millennium Assyrian and Babylonian texts employ the long spelling when the circumstances call for the precise form of the name. The personal name Martuku is not to be confused with the god Marduk. Marduk was commonly called Bēl (lord) in the First Millennium BC.

The etymology for the name Marduk is generally understood to be derived from ^{d}amar-utu-(a)k, meaning "bull-calf of Utu". Sommerfield suggests this is used to explain the name Marduk in the Enuma Elish as "He is the 'son of the sun (Note: The original text is lu-ú ma-ru Šamši ša ilāni né-bu-ú šu-ma. This is reading maru ("son") as being in the possessive case. Lambert reads the same passage as "he is the son, the sun god of the gods, he is dazzling" separating the two clauses)' of the gods, radiant is he." While the name may suggest a relationship with Shamash, Marduk has no genealogy with the sun god. However, Babylon was closely associated with the city of Sippar in this period, which may have been the reason for the name.

== History ==
=== 3rd millennium BC ===
Marduk, along with the city of Babylon, was unimportant and sparsely attested in the 3rd millennium BC. The earliest mention of Marduk comes from a fragmentary inscription, most likely dating to the Early Dynastic II period (ED II). It is left by an unnamed ruler of the city of BAR.KI.BAR (likely Babylon) who constructed a temple for Marduk. A text from the Fara period (ED IIIa) seems to mention Marduk without the divine determinative, and a fragment of a contemporary god list from Abu Salabikh contains ^{d}utu-ama[r], likely Marduk written with reversed sign order. A dubious reference to Marduk from the subsequent Ur III period comes from the possible personal name "Amar-Sin is the star of Marduk", although Johandi suggests that the god Martu who appeared together with Enki and Damgalnuna in the Ur III period could possibly refer instead to the similarly named Marduk who is otherwise missing in Ur III documentation, as Martu is later attested to have a different parentage (Anu and Urash) and Marduk is later considered the son of Enki/Ea. If so, this could be evidence that Marduk was already part of the pantheon of Eridu during the Ur III period.

=== Old Babylonian period ===
During the First Dynasty of Babylon under the king Sumu-la-El, Marduk appeared in oaths and several year names, namely year name 22, which recorded fashioning a throne for Marduk, and year name 24, which recorded making a statue for the goddess Zarpanitum, his spouse. Marduk also started to appear in theophoric names, which would become more frequent in the following decades but would remain rare, appearing in less than 1% of names, although it would grow to 1-2% under Hammurabi. During the reigns of Sabium, Apil-Sin and Sin-muballit, Marduk started to be mentioned outside of the city of Babylon and was invoked alongside local gods in cities subject to the Babylonian kings. Starting from the reign of Hammurabi, sanctuaries to Marduk were found in other cities.

In the Old Babylonian Period, while Marduk is acknowledged to be the ruler of the people, there is no evidence that Hammurabi or his successors promoted Marduk at the expense of other gods. Enlil was still recognized as the highest authority, and Marduk was far from being the pantheon head, instead appearing to be a mediator between the great gods and Hammurabi. This is also expressed in inscriptions from Hammurabi's successor Samsu-iluna, expressing that he receives Enlil's orders through the other gods, such as Ishtar, Zababa, Shamash and Marduk.

A key development during the Old Babylonian period was the association of Marduk with the pantheon of Eridu. Marduk was syncretized with Asalluhi in the later half of the Old Babylonian period, and the opening of the Code of Hammurabi identifies Ea as the father of Marduk, a genealogy that would remain canonical. God lists from the Old Babylonian period sometimes place him within the circle of Enki. TCL 15 10 lists Asalluhi and Marduk as separate gods, but close together in the list. Lambert suggests that this may be an intrusion by another scribe, and that the editor scribe did so under the belief that Marduk and Asalluhi were the same god. Johandi on the other hand suggests that Marduk and Asalluhi were not seen as the same god, but were viewed to be related to one another. The Nippur God List also lists Asalluhi and Marduk separately, with Marduk appearing seventy names before Asalluhi. In the Weidner god list, however, it appears that Marduk and Asalluhi were viewed as the same god.

According to the Marduk prophecy and inscriptions of Agum II, the statue of Marduk and Zarpanitum were removed from Babylon by Mursili I during his raid on Babylon (middle chronology 1595 BC), which was returned during the reign of Agum II.

=== Middle Babylonian period ===
In the Kassite period, theophoric names containing Marduk grew to over 10%, and the local temple to Marduk in Nippur was firmly integrated and well established. The Kassite kings sometimes gave Marduk pompous epithets, showing Marduk's growing popularity, however Enlil still ranks as the most important Mesopotamian god, heading the list along with Anu and Ea. At least five Kassite kings bore theophoric names containing Enlil, and Kassite kings, especially Nazi-Maruttash and Kudur-Enlil, are known to have visited Nippur at the beginning of the year. Kurigalzu calls himself the "regent of Enlil" and Dur-Kurigalzu's temple complex holds temples to Enlil, Ninlil and Ninurta.

There are two administrative documents from Nippur from the reigns of two Kassite kings, perhaps Nazi-Maruttash and Shagarakti-Shuriash, that mention the celebration of the akitu festival connected to Marduk. Another text claims the late Kassite king Adad-shuma-usur embarked on a pilgrimage from Babylon to Borsippa and Kutha, Marduk, Nabu and Nergal respectively. However, there are reasons to doubt the historicity of these texts, especially the alleged journey of Adad-shuma-usur since the trio of Marduk, Nabu and Nergal fit the ideology of the 1st millennium BC. Nonetheless, the texts could be evidence that the rise of Marduk was a gradual process that began before Nebuchadnezzar I. Similarly, in the god list An = Anum the number 50, Enlil's number, was assigned to Marduk instead.

A private document dating to the reign of Ashur-uballit I in Assyria refers to a sanctuary of Marduk in the city of Assur. A gate of Marduk was also attested in Assur in the 13th Century. Similar to the Neo-Assyrian period, Marduk was mentioned to receive offerings and gifts in Assur. In the Coronation text of Tukulti-Ninurta, Marduk even received the same amount of offerings as Ashur. The statue of Marduk was carried off by Tukulti-Ninurta I to Assyria, where it would stay until it was returned. The cult of Marduk in Assyria would remain attested in the Neo-Assyrian period.

Marduk was found in Ugarit in an Akkadian hymn that may have been part of the scribal school curriculum.

During the Kassite period, Nabu, previously the scribe of Marduk, came to be viewed as Marduk's son.

=== Second dynasty of Isin ===
By the time of the Babylonian Dynasty of Isin (not to be confused with the Sumerian Dynasty of Isin), an established syncretism of Babylon and Nippur (and by extension Marduk and Enlil) was in place. The names of the city walls were switched, with Imgur-Enlil and Nimit-Enlil in Babylon while Imgur-Marduk and Nimit-Marduk were in Nippur. A first millennium bilingual hymn to Nippur links Babylon and Nippur together:

Nippur is the city of Enlil, Babylon is his favorite. Nippur and Babylon, their meaning is the same.

The ideology of the supremacy of Marduk is generally viewed to have been promoted by Nebuchadnezzar I and his successors. Nebuchadnezzar's second campaign into Elam and the return of the statue of Marduk that was carried off to Elam by either Shutruk-Nahhunte or his son Kutir-Nahhunte in 1155 BC is thought to be the trigger. However, there are chronological problems regarding the abduction of the statue by the Elamites, as the statue of Marduk abducted by Tukulti-Ninurta I wasn't returned yet by the Assyrians before the Elamites sacked Babylon in 1155 BC. Johnson suggests that Tukulti-Ninurta could have taken a different statue of Marduk while the main cult statue was taken by Kuter-Nahhunte, while Bányai believes that immediately following the return of the statue of Marduk by Ninurta-tukulti-Ashur a second invasion by Kuter-Nahhunte carried off the same statue. It has been suggested that the return of Marduk's statue was a 1st millennium BC literary tradition rather than based on historical sources.

Nonetheless, beginning from the reign of Nebuchadnezzar, acknowledgement of Marduk's supremacy over other gods was now the norm. A kudurru dating to the reign of Nebuchadnezzar claims that Marduk, now the "king of the gods" directly dispatched Nebuchadnezzar and gave him weapons, and in the Epic of Nebuchadnezzar, it is Marduk who commanded the gods to abandon Babylonia. A kudurru from the reign of Enlil-nadin-apli calls Marduk the "king of the gods, the lord of the lands", a title that Enlil traditionally held. Likewise, when Simbar-shipak, the first king of the Second Dynasty of Sealand, made Enlil a replacement throne for the one made by Nebuchadnezzar, in his mind this was actually dedicated to Marduk. Other texts, such as Akkadian prayers and incantations also call Marduk the king of the gods.

=== 1st millennium BC ===
The earliest copy of the Enuma Elish, the Babylonian epic of creation, was found in the city of Assur and dated to the 9th century, although the text could go back to the Isin II period. Dalley believes that the Enuma Elish may have been composed during the Old Babylonian Period, although other scholars consider it unlikely. The Enuma Elish describes Marduk's ascendance to kingship by defeating Tiamat. In the end, Marduk is proclaimed the ruler, declares Babylon as the city of kingship, received his fifty names (fifty being the number of Enlil), while Enlil is ignored.

In Assyrian sources, most of the mentions of Marduk's power and authority came from the reigns of the Sargonids. Generally, the Neo-Assyrian kings cared for Babylon and the cult of Marduk. Shalmaneser III visited multiple Babylonian sanctuaries, including that of Marduk. Tiglath-pileser III, after conquering Babylonia, participated in the Akitu festival in Babylon, and Sargon II made Babylon his temporary residence while Dur-Sharrukin was under construction and took part in the Akitu. Marduk frequently appears in Assyrian royal inscriptions, before the Assyrian kings even gained control over Babylonia. In continuation from the Middle Assyrian times, an actual cult of Marduk seemed to have also existed in the Neo-Assyrian period. The Assyrian Divine Directory mentioned that a shrine to Marduk existed in the temple of Gula in Ashur in the Neo-Assyrian period. Marduk and his son Nabu also shared a sanctuary in Nineveh, although it seemed that Nabu was the main deity in contrast to Marduk.

One exception was Sennacherib, who after a series of revolts and the extradition of the crown prince Assur-nadin-shumi to the Elamites (who then probably killed him), decided to destroy Babylon. The Destruction of Babylon in 689 BCE was, judging from Sennacherib's own accounts, bad by Neo-Assyrian standards. Outside of claiming to have destroyed the temples and the cult statues, there was no explicit mention of the fate of Marduk's statue, although Esarhaddon would later claim that the cult statue was taken from Babylon. Sennacherib followed with what has been called a religious reform, the infrastructure of Assur being refashioned in the model of Babylon's, and the Assyrian edition of the Enuma Elish replaced Marduk with the god Ashur (spelled as Anshar) and Babylon with Assur (spelled as Baltil). Other texts referencing Marduk were also adapted and changed to fit Ashur instead, and a bed and throne dedicated to Marduk were rededicated to Ashur after the furniture was brought from Babylon to Assur. The Marduk Ordeal contained cultic commentaries on the Akitu festival reinterpreted to refer to instead Marduk's punishment. However, the more radical reforms were reversed under the reign of his successor Esarhaddon, who also oversaw the reconstruction of Babylon and the eventual return of the statue of Marduk under Šamaš-šuma-ukin. Esarhaddon also crafted a narrative justifying both Sennacherib's destruction and his rebuilding by citing Marduk's divine anger as the cause for Babylon's destruction, who originally decreed for the city to be abandoned for seventy years, but Marduk relented and allowed Esarhaddon to rebuild it. (Note: In line with the Mesopotamian idea that the gods can abandon their cities, this is referring to the narrative that Marduk can and will abandon Babylon and may even direct a foreign power to rule over it until he decides to return. Similarly, Marduk-apla-iddina II also claimed that the Assyrian rule over Babylonia was due to Marduk's anger over the people, until he was satisfied and appointed him to throw off the Assyrians and rule Babylonia)

Nabonassar claimed that Marduk proclaimed him lordship and had ordered him to "plunder his enemy's land" (referring to Assyria), who only ruled Babylonia due to divine anger. He claimed that he killed the Assyrian and laid waste to his lands by the command of Marduk and Nabu and with the weapons of Erra, which was the main trio of the First Millennium Babylonian ideology. In literary texts from the Achaemenid and Seleucid eras, Marduk is said to have commissioned Nabonassar to take revenge on the land of Akkad (Babylonia).

In royal inscriptions of the Neo-Babylonian kings, Marduk is exalted as the king of the gods and as the source of their authority, while Enlil is hardly ever mentioned except when in relation to the city of Nippur. In a Late Babylonian god list, all the gods on the list were identified with Marduk. For example, Ninurta was Marduk of the pickaxe, Nabu was Marduk of accounting, Shamash was Marduk of justice and Tishpak was Marduk of the troops. This "syncretistic tendency" is observed in other late texts, where the other gods appear as aspects of Marduk.

Cyrus, justifying his conquest of Babylonia, claimed that Marduk had abandoned Nabonidus who offended Marduk by turning his back on the Esagila in the Cyrus Cylinder. Another anti-Nabonidus text, the Verse Account, explains that Nabonidus favoured Sin over Marduk. Nabonidus' reverence for the moon god may have been because of familial roots to the city of Harran, and later he even revived the religious institutions of Ur, the main sanctuary of Sin.

== Characteristics ==
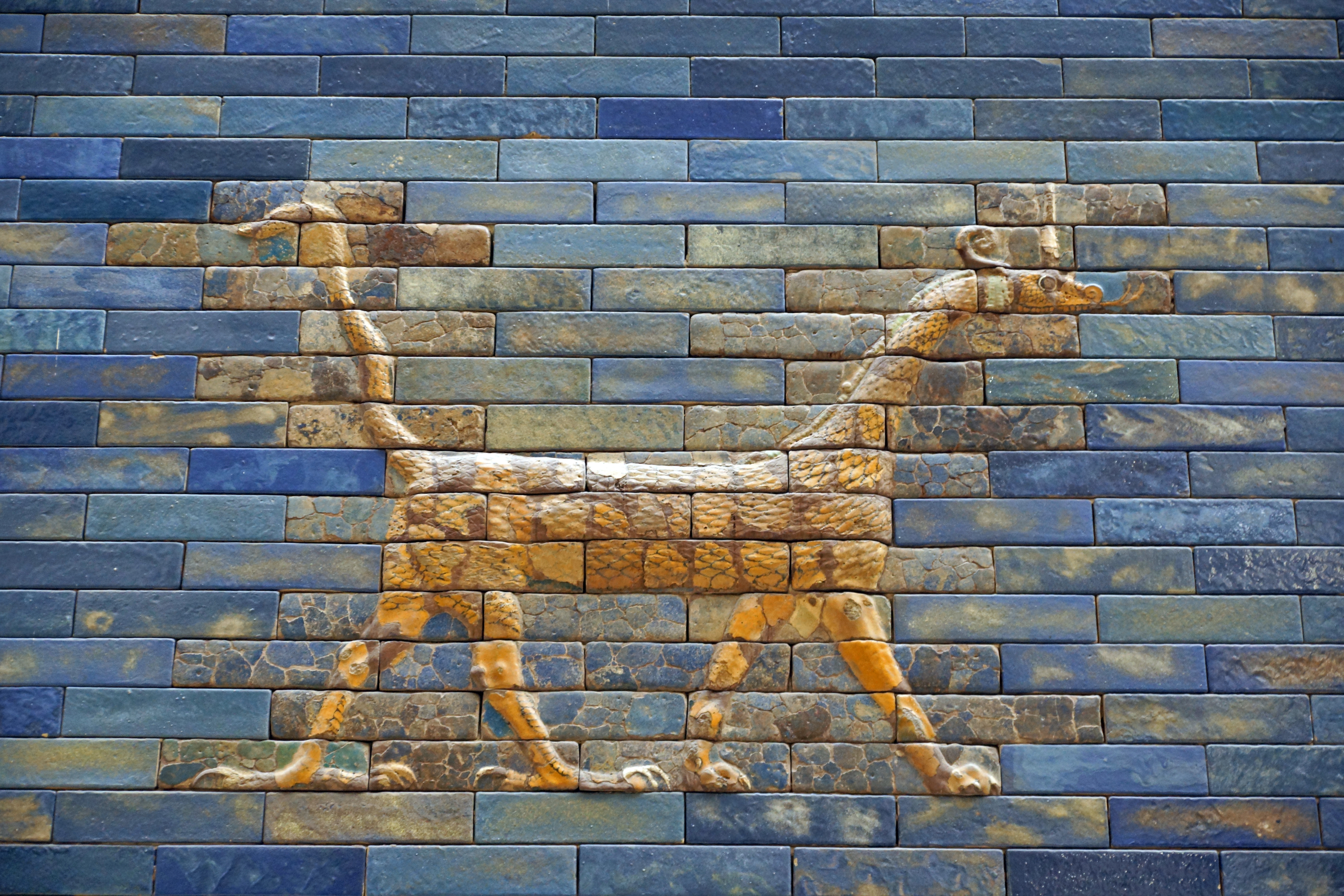
Mušḫuššu, a dragon-like creature, was associated with Marduk.

=== Symbol ===
His symbol is the spade, and he is associated with the Mušḫuššu, a dragon-like creature from Mesopotamian mythology.

=== Original role ===
Since sources pertaining to Marduk in the early periods are sparse, Marduk's original role is unknown. However, since Marduk appears in the Abu Salabikh list behind three minor deities whose names suggest a possible connection to the underworld, Johandi suggests that Marduk may have been a minor god associated with the underworld. Similarly, Oshima recently proposed that Marduk may have originally had a role similar to Nergal, which may even explain why the logogram ^{d}AMAR.UTU is used in Hittite texts to write the name of the god Šanta, who was similar in nature to Nergal.

In the earlier forerunners to the Udug Hul, where both Marduk and Asalluhi appear together in a passage, Marduk, in contrast to Asalluhi, does not help the victim but instead captures him, either because of his powerlessness or because he simply refused to help. Oshima interpreted the passage as supporting the idea that Marduk's original role was illness and death. Similarly, in Sin-iddinam's prayer to Ninisina, Asalluhi (here identified with Marduk) imposes an evil spell on Sin-iddinam (the king of Larsa), causing him to become sick may reflect that Marduk's power to cause illness extended beyond the dominion of Babylon. However Sommerfield, who previously believed that there was little evidence for Marduk being related to magic, more recently suggested that Marduk was originally a god of incantations before his syncretism with Asalluhi.

Jacobsen suggests that Marduk was originally a storm god, based on the storm imagery in the Enuma Elish, wielding the four winds and storms as weapons and assigning to himself the rain and clouds that came from Tiamat's corpse. Abusch, citing Jacobsen, also believes that Marduk was a storm god, and may have been associated with water and vegetation before joining the pantheon of Eridu, as it is improbable to suppose that all of Marduk's traits with water were taken from the circle of Enki. However, there is no other evidence suggesting that Marduk was originally a local storm god, and the usage of wind and storm as weapons is not limited to storm gods.

Schwemer points to Ninurta, who is not a storm god, as the original model for Marduk using storms, winds and floods as weapons. Schwemer also summarizes that although Marduk has characteristics that overlap with the storm god profile, it does not mean that Marduk or other gods in similar position (such as Ninurta, Martu, Telepinu and Tishpak) are necessarily storm gods.

Marduk's symbol, the spade, may point to him originally being a god of agriculture, or, more likely, a god of canals and, by extension, fertility. Unlike Abusch, Oshima believes that Marduk's association with water came from his association with canals. He is depicted as the supplier of water in Prayer to Marduk no.2, dating to the Kassite period, and was praised as the bringer of water from rivers, seasonal floods, and rains to the fields. Various prayers to Marduk refer to his connection with springs and rivers, and Ashurbanipal applies the epithet "the canal inspector of the heavens and the earth" to Marduk. (Note: Similar epithets are also attested for Teshub, Adad, and Ninurta)

=== Marduk's anger and mercy ===
Sin-iddinam's prayer to Ninisina shares motifs with the Prayer to Marduk no. 1 and Ludlul bel nemeqi, in which Marduk's anger is blamed for a certain ailment affecting the sufferer and can only be remedied when Marduk has mercy and forgives them. In the Prayer to Marduk no. 1, Marduk is asked not to kill his client, and in Ludlul, Marduk is praised for his mercy after forgiving his client. As such, some scholars claim that Marduk was being praised for his wrath, and others claim that Marduk comes off as having "unpredictable mood swings." Lambert also points to one of Marduk's names in the Enuma Elish, Meršakušu ("savage, yet relenting"), suggests that the Babylonians may have stressed Marduk's mercy so he could be less savage, although Oshima proposes that the Babylonians had to stress both his wrath and mercy to appease him. Others believe that the purpose of the poem was to stress that Marduk's true inner quality was mercy and benevolence. The Prayer to Marduk no.2, on the other hand, praises Marduk's power to heal, which may have been as a result of syncretism with Asalluhi.

=== Connections to the River Ordeal ===
Due to being the son of Ea, Marduk had connections with the River Ordeal. Sin-iddinam's prayer to Ninisina also identified Idlurugu (the river ordeal) as the father of Marduk/Asalluhi, in contrast to the standard genealogy.

=== Incantations ===
Marduk features in incantations of the Marduk-Ea type formula, in which the god Ea/Enki engages in dialogue with his son Marduk/Asalluhi. The formula begins with Marduk/Asalluhi noticing a problem and reporting it to his father. Ea reassures his son about his knowledge, then instructs him on the procedures. In later incantations from the First Millennium BC, the priests usually claim to be direct representations of Marduk/Asalluhi, replacing the divine dialogue between father and son, for example in Marduk's Address to the Demons the priest starts by declaring themselves to be Marduk. In Neo-Assyrian Assyria, Marduk was one of the major gods that incantation-prayers were directed at, with only Shamash being invoked more than Marduk. It is difficult to tell whether Marduk originally had a role in incantations before being identified with Asalluhi. Marduk sometimes appears in the Sumerian-Akkadian bilinguals as the Akkadian name for Asalluhi, although Marduk and Asalluhi were also attested to appear separately in two different texts, one being the incantation against the evil Udug where Marduk captured the victim instead of helping in contrast to Asalluhi who sought out Enki, the other being an incantation against Lamashtu that listed Marduk and Asalluhi separately as deterrence to the demon.

== Epics and literature ==
=== Enuma Elish ===
The Enuma Elish, generally believed to have been composed in the Isin II period, details Marduk's rise to power as the king of the gods. There are similarities between the Epic of Creation and the Anzu myth as well as other traditions related to Ninurta. The Tablet of Destinies is a key object in both myths, and Marduk uses largely the same weapons as Ninurta. A ritual tablet mentions how the Epic of Creation would be recited and possibly reenacted during the Akitu festival, on the fourth day of the month of Nisannu. The epic starts off by mentioning Apsu and Tiamat, here the oldest gods, and created a younger generation of the gods. However, Apsu was disturbed by their noisiness and decided to kill them. Ea, however, found out about the plot and kills Apsu and takes his splendour. Later Marduk was born to Ea and Damkina, and already at birth he was special. Tiamat then decides to wage war against the younger generation of the gods, giving Kingu the Tablet of Destinies and appointing him as the commander. Marduk volunteers to do battle against Tiamat and defeats her. The world was fashioned from Tiamat's corpse with Babylon as the center, and Marduk assumes kingship and receives his fifty names. The fifty names taken was based on the An = Anum god list, the columnar arrangement removed and slotted in. One of his titles, bēl mātāti (king of the lands) originally belonged to Enlil, who was conspicuously missing from the epic except when he gave this title to Marduk

=== Ludlul bel nemeqi ===
Also known as the "Babylonian Job", the poem describes the narrator's suffering caused by Marduk's anger, causing him to lose his job and to experience hostility from his friends and family. Diviners were incapable of helping him and his personal protective spirits and gods also did not come to help. He claims that nobody understood the actions of the gods, and despite the narrator's protests of innocence and that he had always been pious to the gods and never abandoned him, he quickly became ill and was on death's bed. Then, in a series of dreams, he met a young man, an incantation priest that purified him, a young woman with a godlike appearance who came to say that his suffering had ended, and an incantation priest from Babylon. Afterwards, the narrator praises Marduk's mercy which was the main point of the text despite the expressions of Marduk's anger.

=== Epic of Erra ===
In the Erra epic, Erra convinced Marduk to leave Esagil and to go to the netherworld, leaving Erra to become king. Afterwards, Erra wreaks havoc on all the cities and causes instability. Marduk came back and lamented the state of Babylon. Unlike the Enuma Elish which championed Marduk as the bringer of peace and stability, Marduk is here the one who brought instability by leaving his seat, thus bringing darkness upon the world. He also indirectly brought war by yielding to Erra.

=== Marduk Ordeal ===
Written in the Assyrian dialect, versions of the so-called Marduk Ordeal Text are known from Assur, Nimrud and Nineveh. Using sceneries and language familiar to the procession of the Akitu Festival, here Marduk is instead being held responsible for crimes committed against Ashur and was subject to a river ordeal and imprisonment. The text opens with Nabu arriving in Babylon looking for Marduk, his father. Tashmetum prayed to Sin and Shamash. Meanwhile, Marduk was being held captive, the color red on his clothes was reinterpreted to be his blood, and the case was brought forward to the god Ashur. The city of Babylon also seemingly rebelled against Marduk, and Nabu learned that Marduk was taken to the river ordeal. Marduk claims that everything was done for the good of the god Ashur and prays to the gods to let him live (Note: In the Ninevite version of the Marduk Ordeal, it is Sarpanit who prays to let Marduk live). After various alternate cultic commentaries, the Assyrian version of the Enuma Elish was recited, proclaiming Ashur's superiority. However, despite the content, the Marduk Ordeal was not simply an anti-Marduk piece of literature. At no point was Marduk actually accused of a crime, and the end of the text seems to suggest that the gods fought to get Marduk out by drilling holes through the door which he is locked behind. Marduk also appeared in the curse section, so it is possible that the majority of the blame was put on the Babylonians for leading Marduk astray, while Marduk retains a position within the pantheon. While most attribute this text to Sennacherib's destruction of Babylon, Frymer-Kensky suggests that the background could be the return of Marduk's statue to Babylon in 669 BCE.

=== Enmesharra's Defeat ===
Known from only one copy and with a badly damaged top half, Enmesharra's Defeat is likely composed in the Seleucid or Parthian era. Structurally similar to the Enuma Elish, the text starts with Enmesharra and his seven sons going against Marduk, who subsequently defeated them and threw them into jail with Nergal as the prison warden. The preserved portion starts with Nergal announcing Marduk's judgement to Enmesharra that he and his sons would all be put to death, and Enmesharra laments about Marduk's terrible judgement and pleads with Nergal. Nergal replies, but the text breaks off. Nergal is then shown to be escorting Enmesharra and his sons to Marduk, who first beheads the sons, and Enmesharra's radiance was then taken and given to Shamash. Nabu was also given the power of Ninurta, Nergal those of Erra, and Marduk took Enlil's power. Marduk, Nabu and Nergal then shared the throne, which likely previously belonged to Anu, together. The gods were then assigned their cities, and a voice from heaven could be heard. A fish-goat praised Marduk as the exalted lord, and the text ends with the gods gathering at Babylon.

== Syncretisms ==
=== Asalluhi ===
The earliest evidence of Asalluhi's syncretism with Marduk is Sin-iddinam's prayer to Ninisina, where Asalluhi was called the "king of Babylon." An Old Babylonian text substitutes "son of Eridu" for "lord of Tintir" as a title for Asalluhi (Tintir being another attested name for Babylon.) In Hammurabi's prayer to Asalluhi, he is clearly viewed as synonymous with Marduk. However, in a prayer for Samsu-iluna, Marduk and Asalluhi were mentioned as separate gods, suggesting that the syncretism Marduk = Asalluhi was not yet fully established as canonical in the Old Babylonian period. Johandi also suggests that keeping Marduk and Asalluhi separate was a deliberate act on the part of Samsu-iluna to reclaim authority over the southern cities, which were centers of rebellion during the early years of his reign.

Sommerfield suggested that the syncretism may have been due to both having a similar role as a god of incantations, or because Asalluhi was more well known in Southern Babylonia compared to Marduk, who was still a local god. Lambert also believes the syncretism to be a means to elevate Marduk to a more respectable position. Johandi proposes that Marduk and Asalluhi were identified for some other reason other than magic, and Marduk only became a god associated with magic after being syncretized with Asalluhi.

=== Enlil ===
The syncretism of Babylon and Nippur was in place from the Isin II period, and the names of the city walls were switched, with Imgur-Enlil and Nimit-Enlil in Babylon while Imgur-Marduk and Nimit-Marduk were in Nippur. By extension, Marduk was also identified with Enlil, and in the Isin II period Marduk was attested with Enlil's titles. Marduk was often called the "Enlil of the gods" in the First Millennium.

A statue of Marduk, conveniently named "King of the gods of Heaven and the Underworld" was placed in Enlil's sanctuary in Babylon, and Marduk receives the title bēl mātāti "king of the lands" in the Enuma Elish.

=== Tutu ===
The previous patron deity of Borsippa. Although Hammurabi recognized Tutu's dominion as extending over Borsippa and E-zida, Tutu became another name for Marduk after Hammurabi, but became a byname for Nabu in the First Millennium. Tutu was also a name for Marduk in the Enuma Elish. In the bird call text, the bird of Enmesharra calls that he sinned against Tutu, here meaning Marduk.

== See also ==
- Akitu
- Etemenanki
- Mesopotamian Religion
- Zakmuk
