= Sabium =

Amorite king

Sabium Sabūm

King of Babylon
- Reign: c. 1845 – c. 1831 BC
- Predecessor: Sumu-la-El
- Successor: Apil-Sin
- Died: c. 1831 BC

Location of Babylon

Sabium (sà-bi-um also Sabum sà-bu-um and Zabium) was an Amorite King in the First Dynasty of Babylon, the Amorite Dynasty. He ruled what was at the time a small recently created Amorite kingdom which included the town of Babylon. Sabium makes no claim of kingship of Babylon itself, suggesting that it had not yet grown into the major metropolis it would become under his descendant Hammurabi. His is known to have maintained control over the city of Sippar, conquered by Sumu-la-El. He is roughly cotemporal with Enlil-bani of Isin, Sin-Iddinam of Larsa, Ibal-pi-El I of Eshnunna, and the obscure Aminum of Ekallatum. Because the Old Babylonian period archaeological levels at the city of Babylon were below the water table and not excavated what is known about Sabium is from other sites like Sippar, which Babylon controlled.

About 14 year names of Sabium are known, notably (Note that the god of Ibbi-Anum is Urash and the god of E-sagil is Marduk):

- Year the city wall of Kazallu was destroyed
- Year the army of Larsa was smitten by weapons
- Year Sabium built the city wall of Kar-Shamash
- Year in which Sabium the king built (the temple) E-babbar (of Shamash)
- Year (Sabium) restored the house / temple of Ibbi-Anum
- Year in which Sabium the king built E-sagil, temple raising the head to heaven / temple in which the head of the king is raised

Ibal-pi-El I of Eshnunna is known to have concluded a treaty with Sin-Iddinam of Larsa and Sîn-kāšid of Uruk against Sabium and his ally Ikūn-pī-Sîn of Nerebtum.

It is known that in his 1844 BC accession year Sabium decreed a mīšarum (forgiveness of debt) in the kingdom. This was a fairly common practice for rulers of that period. The god Nabu was first attested in the pantheon of Babylon during the reign of Sabium, with the name ^{d}na-bi-um.

In a letter to later ruler of Babylon Sin-Muballit, the later Uruk ruler An-am (c. 1824-1816 BC) reminds him that Sabium had sent one thousand soldiers to Uruk in support in his time.

A Neo-Babylonian text contains a literary chronicle of Sabium and Apil-Sin.

== See also ==
- Chronology of the ancient Near East
- List of Mesopotamian dynasties

Regnal titles
Preceded by Sumu-la-El	King of Babylon c. 1845 – c. 1831 BC	Succeeded by Apil-Sin
