= Sippar =

Archaeological site in Iraq

Coordinates: 33°03′32″N 44°15′08″E

- Sippar (Sumerian)
- Location within Iraq
- Type: settlement
- Periods: Early Dynastic, Old Babylonian, Kassite, Neo-Assyrian, Neo-Babylonian
- Location: Baghdad Governorate, Iraq
- Region: Mesopotamia

Site notes
- Excavation dates: 1880-1881, 1894, 1972-1973, 1978-2002
- Archaeologists: Hormuzd Rassam, Jean-Vincent Scheil, H. Gasche, Walid al-Jadir

Sippar (Sumerian: 𒌓𒄒𒉣𒆠, Zimbir) (also Sippir or Sippara) was an ancient Near Eastern Sumerian and later Babylonian city on the east bank of the Euphrates river. Its tell is located at the site of modern Tell Abu Habbah near Yusufiyah in Iraq's Baghdad Governorate, some 69 km (43 mi) north of Babylon and 30 km (19 mi) southwest of Baghdad. The city's ancient name, Sippar, could also refer to its sister city, Sippar-Amnanum (located at the modern site of Tell ed-Der); a more specific designation for the city here referred to as Sippar was Sippar-Yaḫrurum (Sippar-Jaḫrurum). The name comes from the Amorite Yaḫrurum tribe that lived in the area along with the Amorite Amnanum tribe. The Babylonian Map of the World was found in Sippar.

== History ==
While pottery finds indicate that the site of Sippar was in use as early as the Uruk period, substantial occupation occurred only in the Early Dynastic and Akkadian Empire periods of the 3rd millennium BC, the Old Babylonian and Kassite periods of the 2nd millennium BC, and the Neo-Babylonian times of the 1st millennium BC. Lesser levels of use continued into the time of the Achaemenid, Seleucid and Parthian Empires.

=== Early Bronze Age ===
Despite the fact that thousands of cuneiform clay tablets have been recovered at the site, relatively little is known about the history of Sippar. In the Sumerian king list a king of Sippar, En-men-dur-ana, is listed as one of the early pre-dynastic rulers of the region but has not yet turned up in the epigraphic records.

==== Akkadian period ====
Sippar was the cult site of the sun god (Sumerian Utu, Akkadian Shamash), along with his consort Aya, and the home of his temple E-babbara (𒂍𒌓𒌓𒊏, means "white house") where the Cruciform Monument of Manishtushu was found. Mamu, the daughter of Shamash, also had a temple in Sippar as did the goddesses Nin-Isina, Ninḫegal, Ninkarrak, and Tašmētum.

In the later part of the 3rd millennium BC, a large coalition of city-states led by Iphur-Kis of Kish (Sumer) and Amar-Girid of Uruk, joined by Enlil-nizu of Nippur, and including the city-states of "Kutha, TiWA, Sippar, Kazallu, Kiritab, [Api]ak and GN" as well as "Amorite [hi]ghlanders" revolted against Akkadian Empire ruler Naram-Sin of Akkad. The rebellion was joined by the city of Borsippa, among others. The revolt was crushed.

=== Middle Bronze Age ===
Sippar was the production center of wool. It also produced some of the finest Old Babylonian cylinder seals.

==== Middle Bronze I ====
In Middle Bronze IB (c. 1900-1820 BC), the city-state of Babylon started to expand. Sippar eventually came within the Babylonian realm. Sumu-la-El of Babylon (r. 1878-1843 BC) conducted several military campaigns gaining control over Sippar. In his 29th year of reign, Sumulael reported building the city wall of Sippar. Sabium (r. 1842-1829 BC) did some religious activity dedicated to Utu/Shamash, Marduk in one of his year-names. Apil-Sin (r. 1828-1812 BC) did some activity in Sippar in his Year 14.

Based on Shamash Temple records Sippar ruler Immerum (Akkadian for sheep or ram) is known to have been roughly contemporary with the rule of Sumu-la-El and independent of though possibly vassal to Babylon. He is also mentioned in a oath on a text found at Šaduppûm (Tell Harmal). Another was found at Chagar Bazar. He is suggested to have been ruling Sippar when Babylon took control based on a text sealed with oaths to both Immerum and Sumu-la-El. In another text detailing gifts for dignitaries Sumu-abum, first ruler of the First Babylonian Empire received the largest gift with Immerum and Sumu-la-El (2nd ruler of that empire) receiving smaller gifts. Four year names of Immerum are known including "The year (in which) the temple of Inanna Immerum built". Another year name was "Year when Immerum dug the Asuhu canal". It was suggested that Immerum could also be read as Nur^{d}-Immer. In the Immerum year name "The year (in which) he fashioned two BALAG li-li-ìs for Shamash" a Balag is a musical instrument used in religious ceremonies by a Gala priest. The ruler Ammi-ṣura (Hammi-ṣura) is known from 8 texts a several year names including "Year: Ammi-ṣura laid the foundations of Adad’s temple". Another ruler, Buntaätun-ila, is also known from texts one, dated with the year name "Year Bunu-tahtun-ila (became) king", also bears a synchronism with Sumu-la-El. In another year name he brought a kettledrum (lilissu drum) into the temple of Ninkarrak/Gula. Buntaätun-ila is generally thought to be the final independent ruler of Sippar before it came under the control of Babylon. The ruler Ilum-ma-Ila is only known from texts. The rulers Altinû and Lipit-Ištar have also been suggested as rulers of Sippar in this period. year names are known including "The year in which Lipit-Ištar expelled the Amorites". They definitely ruled somewhere the question is whether it was at Sippar.

==== Middle Bronze II (c. 1820-1587 BC) ====
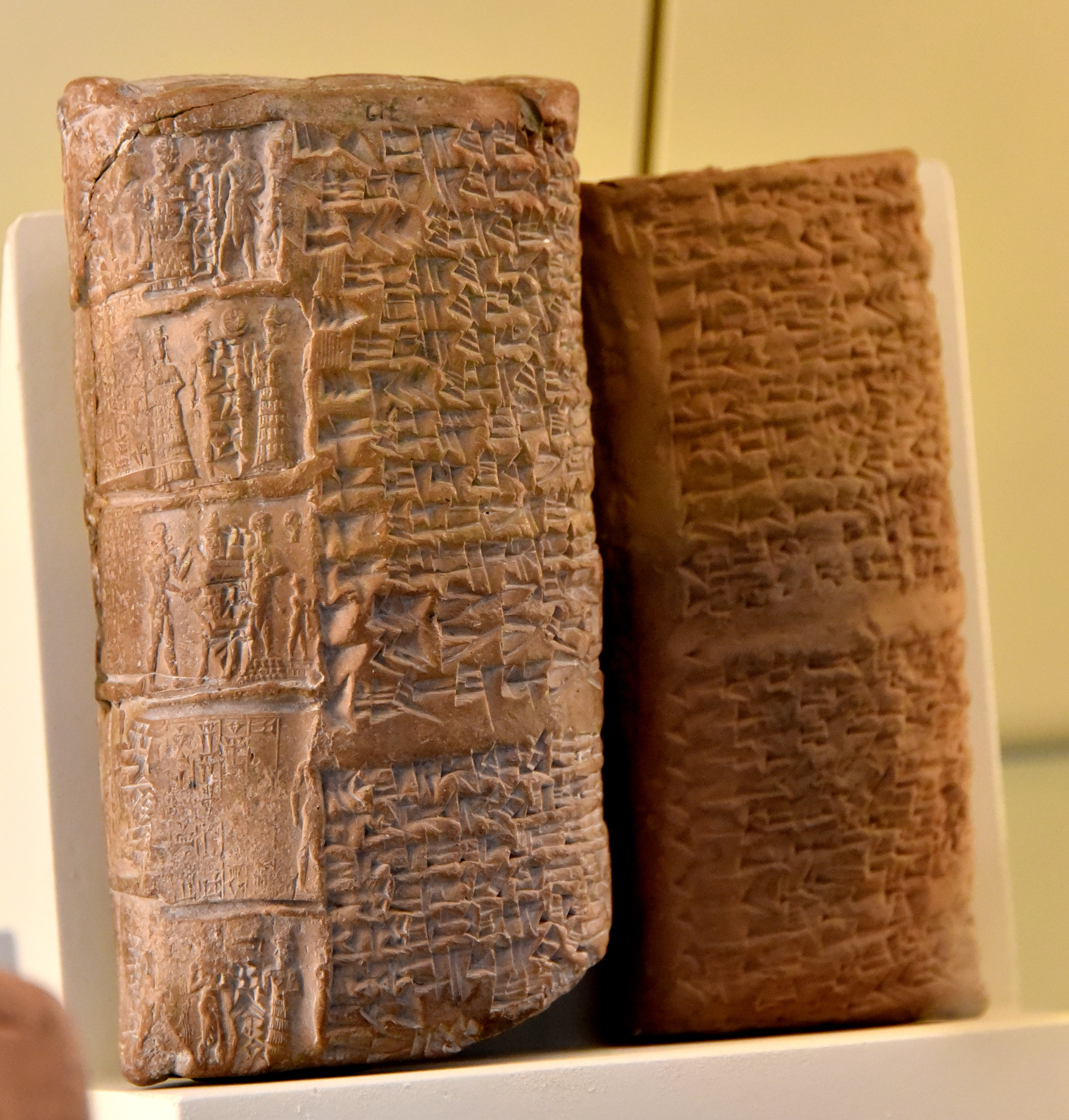
Clay tablet and its sealed clay envelope. Legal document, listing of land and their distribution to several sons. From Sippar, Iraq. Old-Babylonian period. Reign of Sin-Muballit, 1812-1793 BCE. Vorderasiatisches Museum, Berlin

Sin-Muballit (r. 1811-1793 BC) controlled the city and a sealed clay envelope is known.

Hammurabi's Babylonia 1

Some years later Hammurabi of Babylon (r. 1792-1750 BC) reported laying the foundations of the city wall of Sippar in his 23rd year and worked on the wall again in his 43rd year. His successor in Babylon, Samsu-iluna (r. 1749-1712 BC) worked on Sippar's wall in his 1st year. The city walls, being typically made of mud bricks, required much attention. The Code of Hammurabi stele was probably erected at Sippar. Shamash was the god of justice, and he is depicted handing authority to the king in the image at the top of the stele.

The city flourished under Babylonian rule until the Sack of Babylon by Mursili I of Hatti around 1587 BC.

=== Late Bronze Age ===
The city then came under the control of the Kassite dynasty. In the final years of that dynasty the Elamite ruler Shutruk-Nakhunte (c. 1184 to 1155 BC) captured Sippar. Shutruk-Nakhunte carried back statues from the Shamash temple to Susa adding his own inscription to a stele of the Akkadian Empire ruler Naram-Sin:

"I am Shutruk-Nahhunte, son of Hallutush-Inshushinak, beloved servant of the god Inshushinak, king of Anshan and Susa, who has enlarged the kingdom, who takes care of the lands of Elam, the lord of the land of Elam. When the god Inshushinak gave me the order, I defeated Sippar. I took the stele of Naram-Sin and carried it off, bringing it to the land of Elam. For Inshushinak, my god, I set it as an offering."

=== Iron Age ===
==== Neo-Babylonian period ====
In the succeeding Late Bronze Age collapse period, it was taken by the Neo-Babylonian ruler Nebuchadnezzar I about 1120 BC. In the reign of Neo-Babylonian ruler Adad-apla-iddina (c. 1064–1043 BC) the Shamash cult center along with all the other temples in Sippar were destroyed by Suteans and cult symbol of Shamash was lost.

==== Neo-Assyrian period ====
In the early 1st millennium BC, Sippar came under Neo-Assyrian control. After the final defeat of the Neo-Assyrians by the Neo-Babylonians at the Battle of Carchemish in 605 BC text report that a number of Egyptian and Assyrian prisoners were brought to Sippar as chattel. Records of Neo-Babylonian ruler Nebuchadnezzar II (605-562 BC) and Nabonidos (556-539 BC) record that they repaired the Shamash temple E-babbara.

==== Achaemenid period ====
After the Battle of Opis in September 539 BC Sippar surrendered to the Achaemenid Empire, followed soon after by the fall of the Neo-Babylonian empire.

After the Battle of Guagamela in 331 BCE, a cuneiform tablet records a message originating in Sippar from Alexander the Great to the people of Babylon promising that he "shall not enter your houses."

=== Speculation ===
Xisuthros, the "Chaldean Noah" in Sumerian mythology, is said by Berossus to have buried the records of the antediluvian world here—possibly because the name of Sippar was supposed to be connected with sipru, "a writing". And according to Abydenus, Nebuchadnezzar II excavated a great reservoir in the neighbourhood.

Pliny (Natural History 6.30.123) mentions a sect of Chaldeans called the Hippareni. It is often assumed that this name refers to Sippar (especially because the other two schools mentioned seem to be named after cities as well: the Orcheni after Uruk, and the Borsippeni after Borsippa), but this is not universally accepted.

Sippar has been suggested as the location of the Biblical Sepharvaim in the Old Testament, which alludes to the two parts of the city in its dual form.

== Archaeology ==
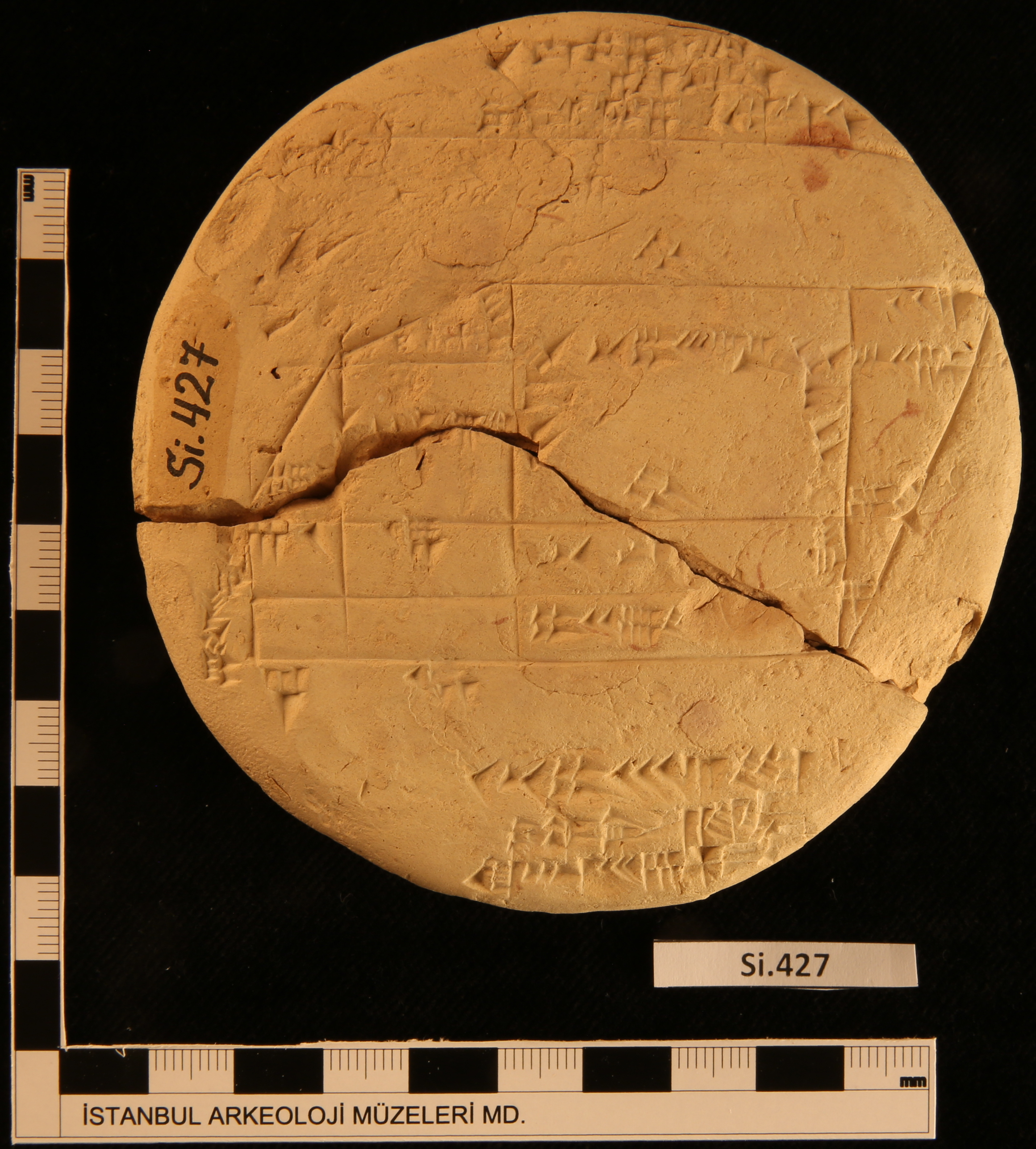
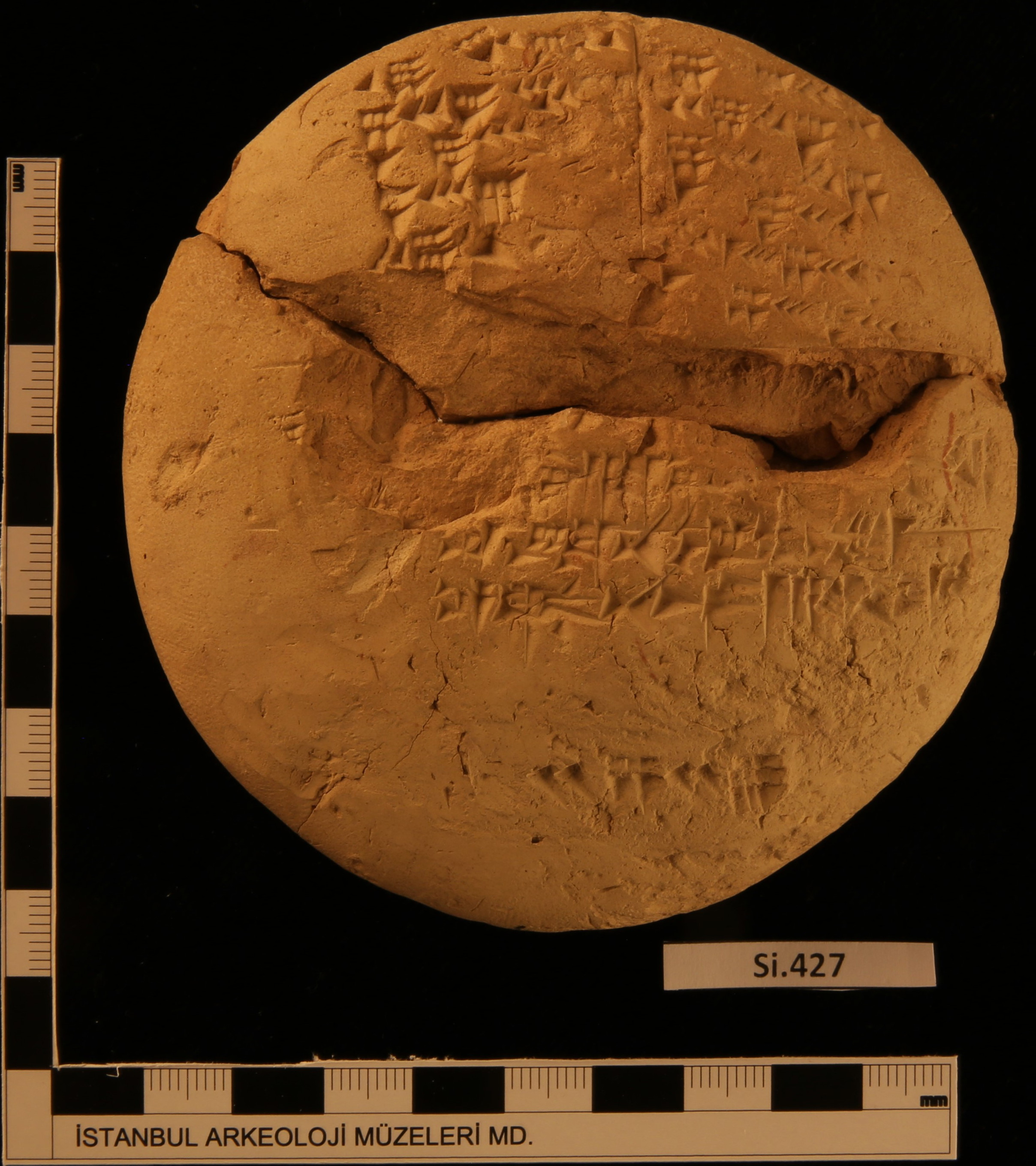
Si.427, a tablet excavated in Sippar in 1894, depicting a land survey. A mathematical text dealing with the surface area of a field divided into 11 pieces.

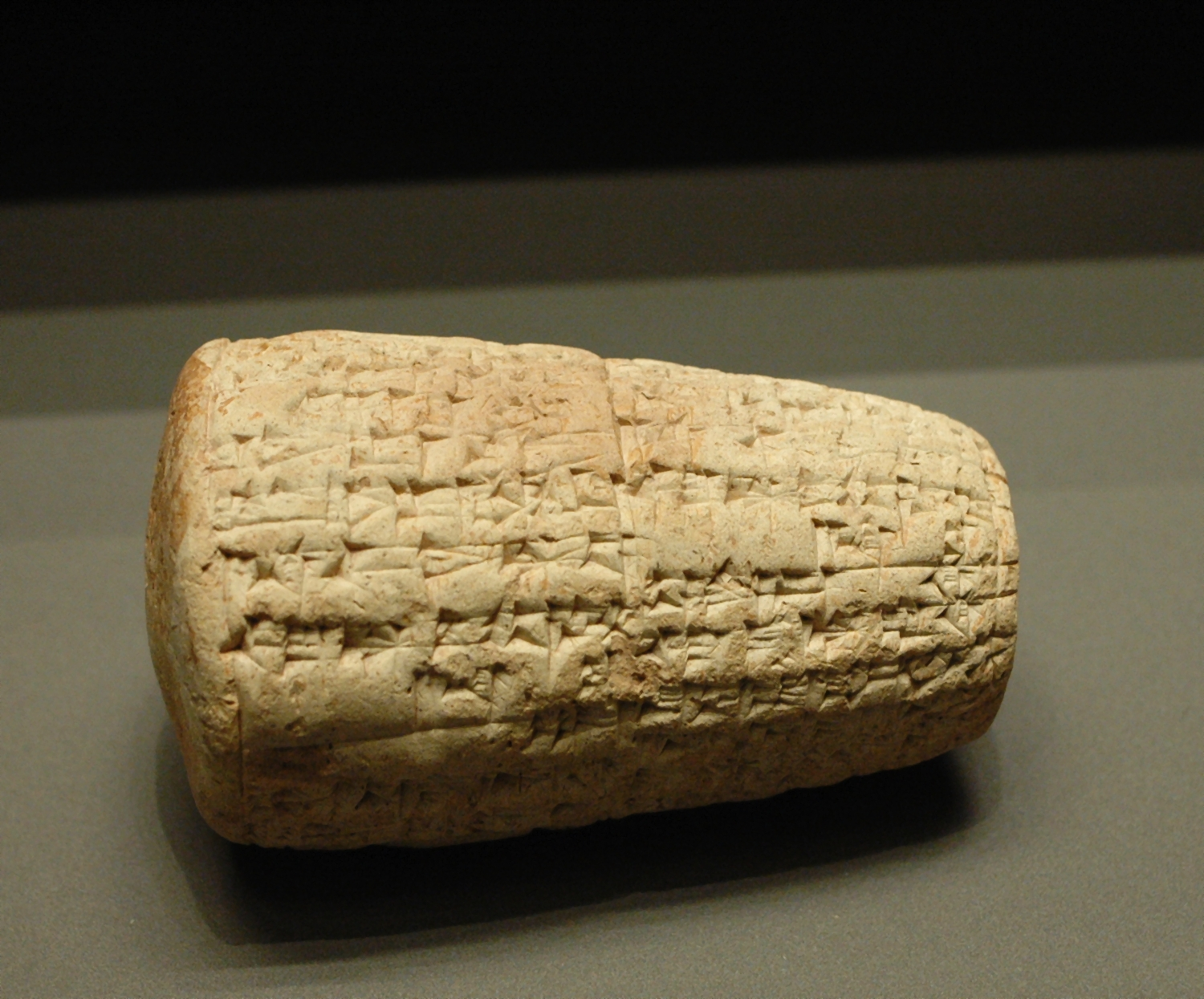
Hammurabi clay cone from Sippar at Louvre

Tell Abu Habba, measuring over 1 square kilometer was first excavated by Hormuzd Rassam (referring to the site as Aboo-Habba) between 1880 and 1881 for the British Museum in a dig that lasted 18 months. Rassam excavated only down to the Old Babylonian levels and was focused mainly on the Neo-Babylonian remains. Tens of thousands of tablets were recovered including the Tablet of Shamash in the Temple of Shamash/Utu. Most of the tablets were Neo-Babylonian. The temple had been mentioned as early as the 18th year of Samsu-iluna of Babylon, who reported restoring "Ebabbar, the temple of Szamasz in Sippar", along with the city's ziggurat.

The tablets, which ended up in the British Museum, are being studied to this day. As was often the case in the early days of archaeology, excavation records were not made, particularly find spots. This makes it difficult to tell which tablets came from Sippar-Amnanum as opposed to Sippar. Other tablets from Sippar were bought on the open market during that time and ended up at places like the British Museum and the University of Pennsylvania. Since the site is relatively close to Baghdad, it was a popular target for illegal excavations.

In 1894, Sippar was worked briefly by Jean-Vincent Scheil. The tablets recovered, mainly Old Babylonian, went to the Istanbul Museum. In 1927 archaeologists Walter Andrae and Julius Jordan visited, and mapped, the site. In modern times, the site was worked, mainly soundings, by a Belgian team led by H. Gasche from 1972 to 1973. They determined that Sippar was protected by a wall, partially for flood protection, extending 1200 meters by 800 meters, cutting a trench across it. A tablet of Samsu-iluna was found showing the wall dated back to at least Old Babylonian period though ground water prevented deeper excavation.

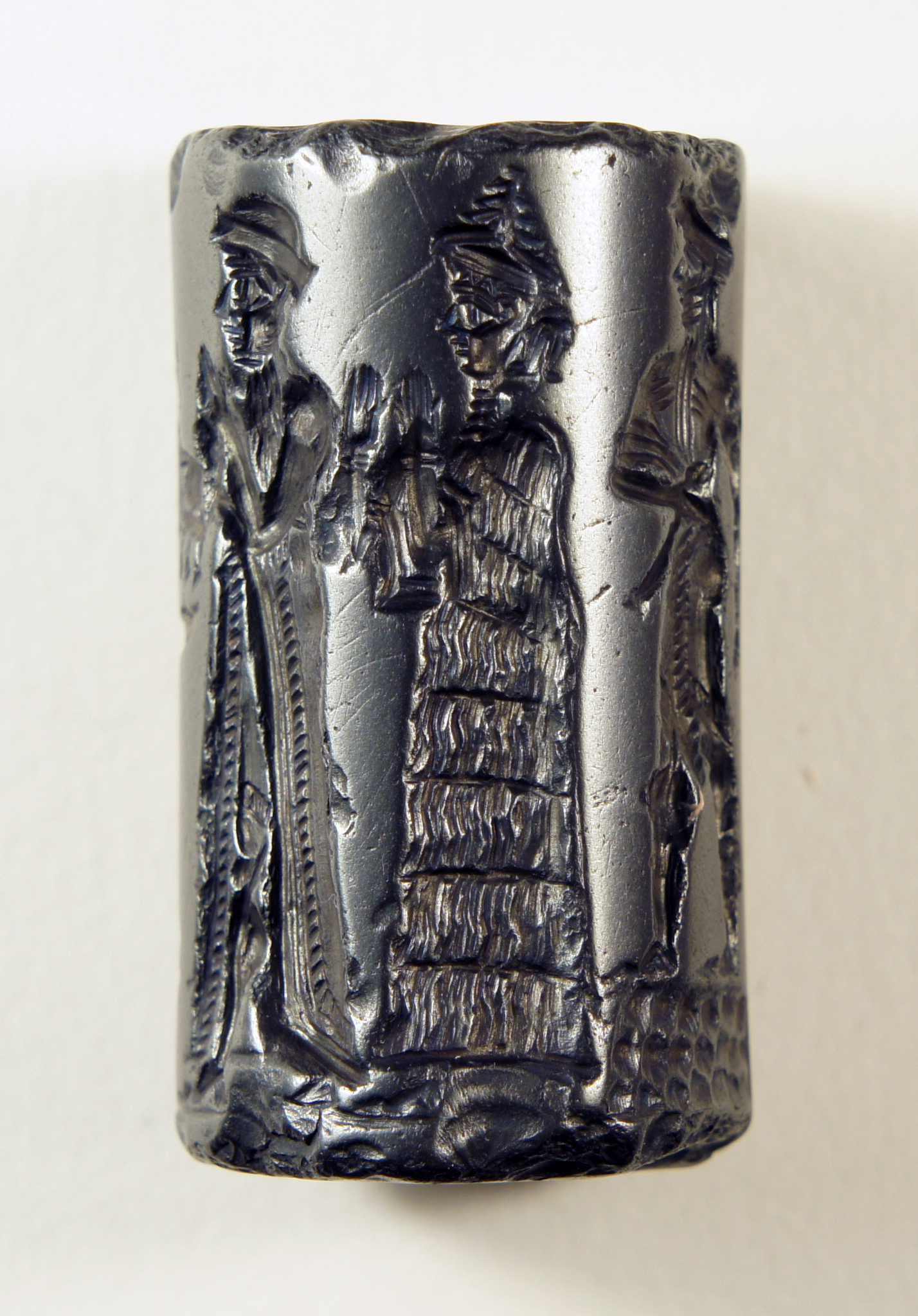
Old Babylonian Cylinder Seal, hematite. The king makes an animal offering to Shamash. The style of this seal suggests that it originated from a workshop in Sippar

Iraqi archaeologists from the College of Arts at the University of Baghdad, led by Walid al-Jadir with Farouk al-Rawi, have excavated at Tell Abu Habbah starting in 1978. Work began with a new site contour map and excavation in the Old Babylonian area in the north where two buildings were uncovered. About 100 Old Babylonian period cuneiform tablets were found. Subsequently, the team worked in an Old Babylonian residential area where terracotta plaques and figurines, and cuneiform tablets were found. The tablets were from the reign of Immerum, Buntahun-ila, and Samsu-iluna. Focus then shifted to the Shamash temple area. In the northeast, Old Babylonian part of the site, a 30 meter by 5 meter deep sounding was excavated. The sounding found 4 Old Babylonian levels, 2 Akkadian Empire levels, and 3 Early Dynastic levels ( with plano-convex mud brick construction). In 1986, while clearing spoil from the Rassam excavation in the E-Babbar temple, a room was discovered which Rassam had not noticed. It contained a library with about 400 cuneiform tablets, which had been stored in 10 ranks of 17 cm by 30 cm niches in 4 rows. The tablets included copies of earlier inscriptions dating back to the Akkadian Empire and contemporary texts as late as the reign of Cambyses II. Few of the tablets were published at the time due to conditions in Iraq. With conditions improving, they are now being published. After 2000, they were joined by the German Archaeological Institute. In total, the effort continued in 24 seasons until 2002. In the 24th season in 2002, 700 cuneiform tablets were found in one important building in the center of town. Most date to the reign of Ammi-Saduqa (c. 1646–1626 BC) a ruler of the First Dynasty of Babylon with a few from Abi-Eshuh (c. 1711-1684 BC) and Ammi-Ditana (c. 1683-1647 BC).

== Gallery ==
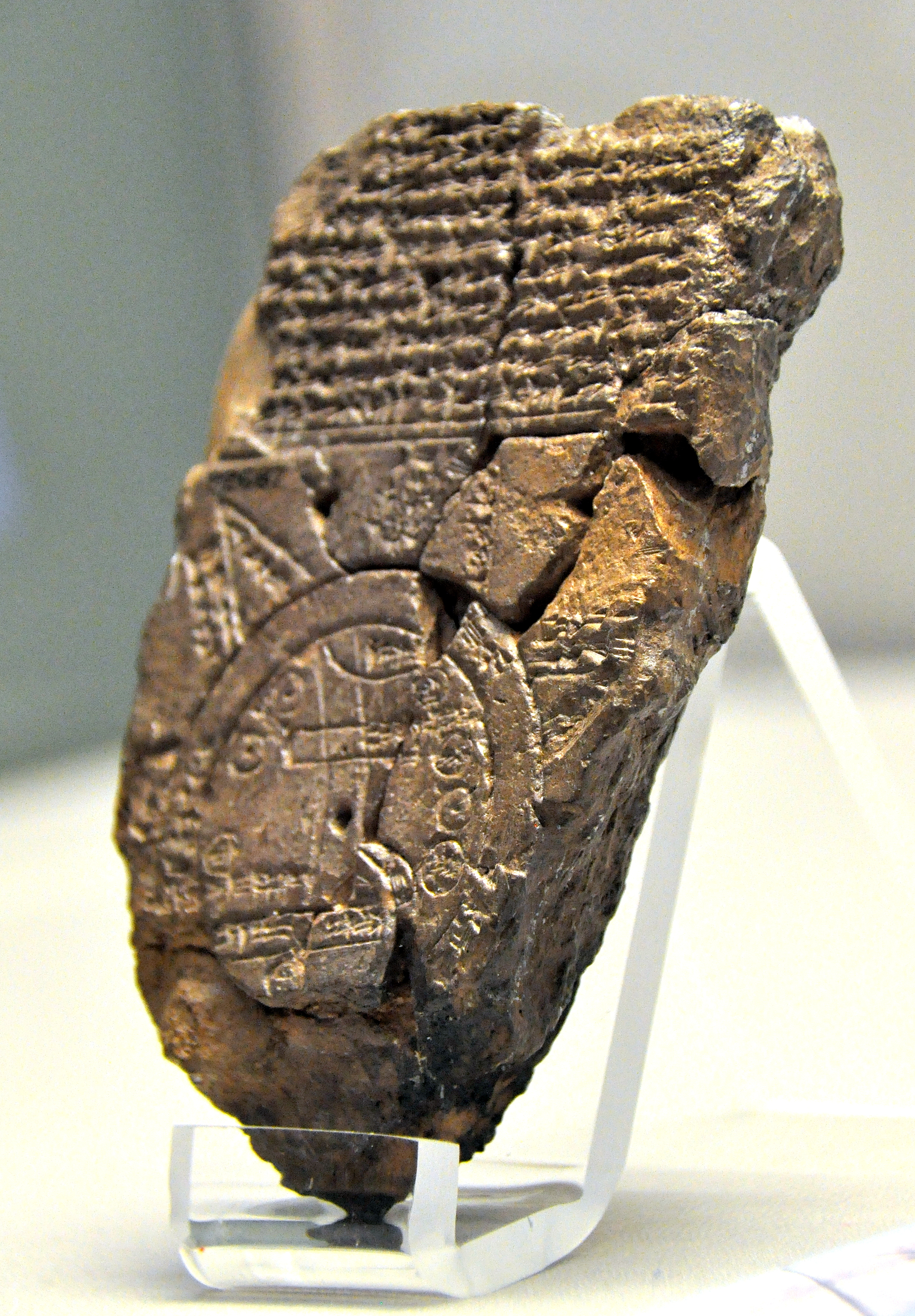
Map of the World from Sippar, Mesopotamia, Iraq. 6th century BCE. The British Museum

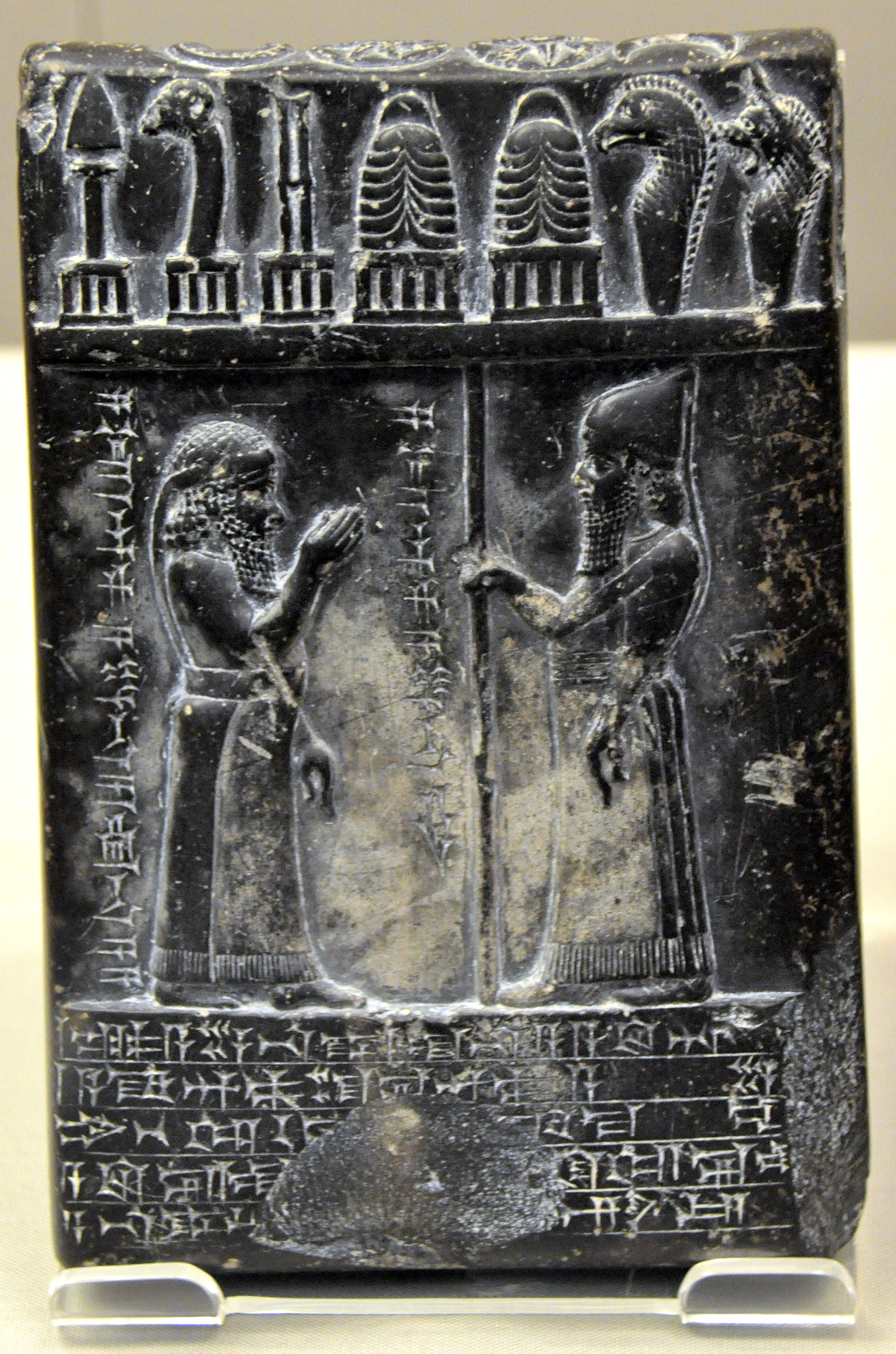
Tablet of Nabu-apla-iddina, 9th century BCE, from Sippar, Iraq. British Museum

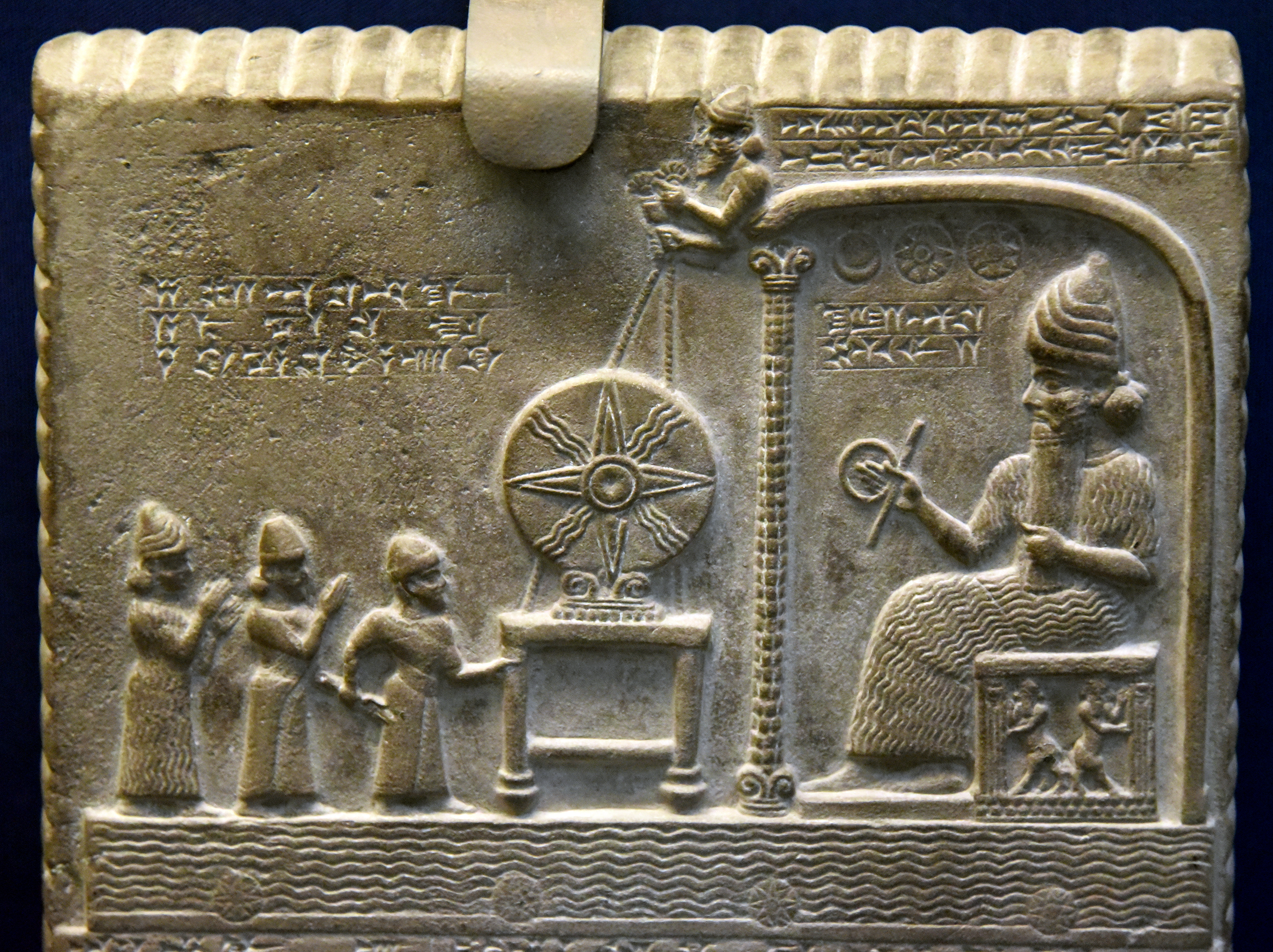
Detail, Sun God Tablet from Sippar, Iraq, 9th century BCE. British Museum

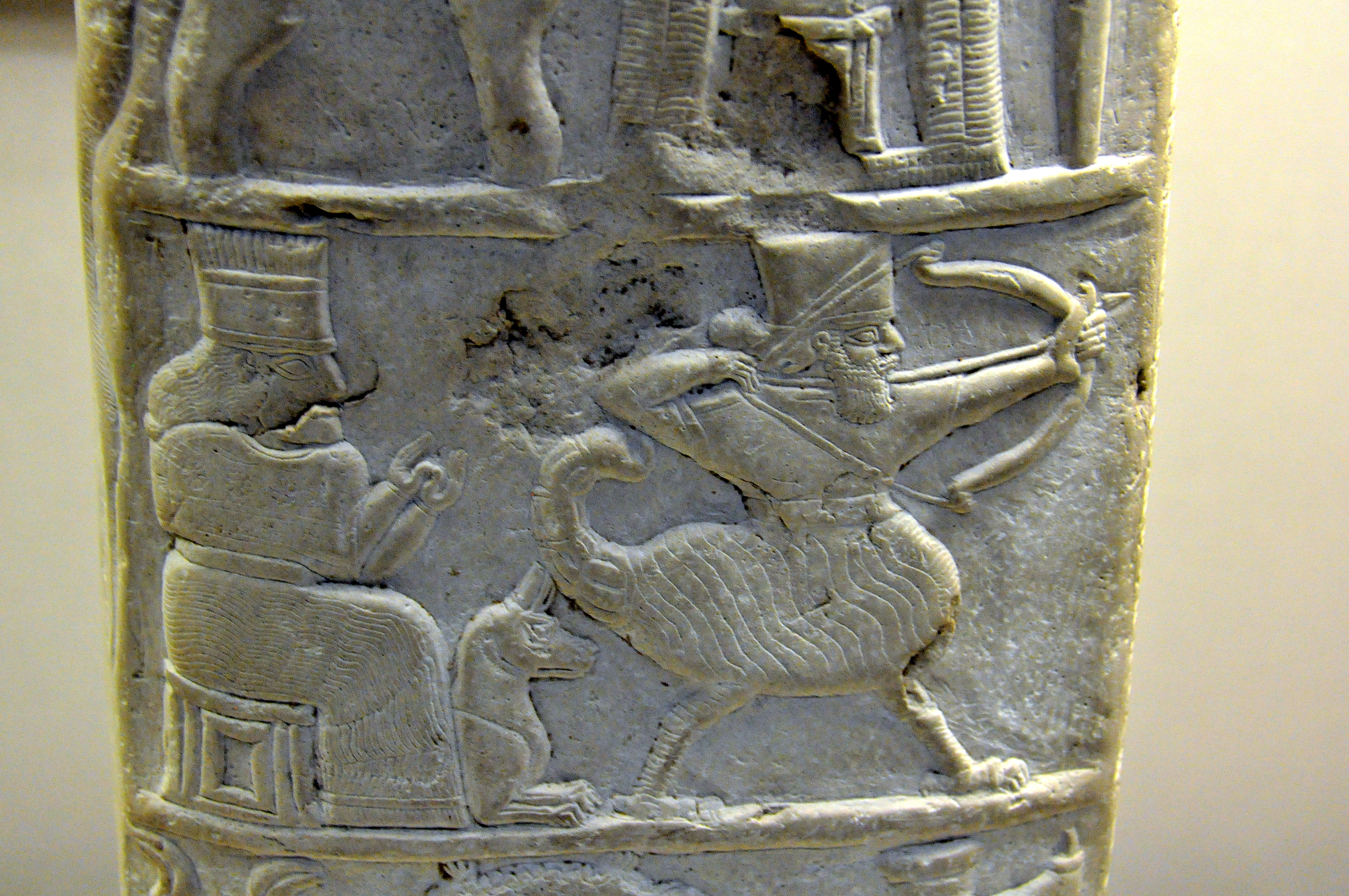
Detail, Kudurru of Ritti-Marduk, from Sippar, Iraq, 1125-1104 BCE. British Museum

== List of rulers ==
The following list should not be considered complete:

#	Depiction	Ruler	Succession	Epithet	Approx. dates	Notes
Early Dynastic I period (c. 2900 – c. 2700 BC)
Predynastic Sumer (c. 2900 – c. 2700 BC)
"Then Larak fell and the kingship was taken to Sippar." — Sumerian King List (SKL)
1st		En-men-dur-ana 𒂗𒉺𒇻𒍣𒀭𒈾			Uncertain, reigned c. 2820 BC (21,000 years)	Said on the SKL to have held the title of, "King" of not just Sippar; but, to have held the "Kingship" over all of Sumer; Known from the SKL; very little otherwise; Historicity uncertain
"1 king; he ruled for 21,000 years. Then Sippar fell and the kingship was taken to Shuruppak." — SKL
#	Depiction	Ruler	Succession	Epithet	Approx. dates	Notes
Old Babylonian period (c. 2000 – c. 1000 BC)
Amorite dynasty (c. 2000 – c. 1000 BC)
		Altinu'u			Uncertain	Historicity certain
		Bunu-tahtun-ila			Uncertain	Historicity certain
		Immerum			reigned c. 1880 – c. 1845 BC	Historicity certain
		Sin-bani			Uncertain	Historicity certain

== See also ==
- List of cities of the ancient Near East
- Cylinders of Nabonidus
- Nadītu in Sippar
