= Old Babylonian Empire =

2nd millennium BCE empire in Babylonia

- c. 1894 BC – c. 1595 BC
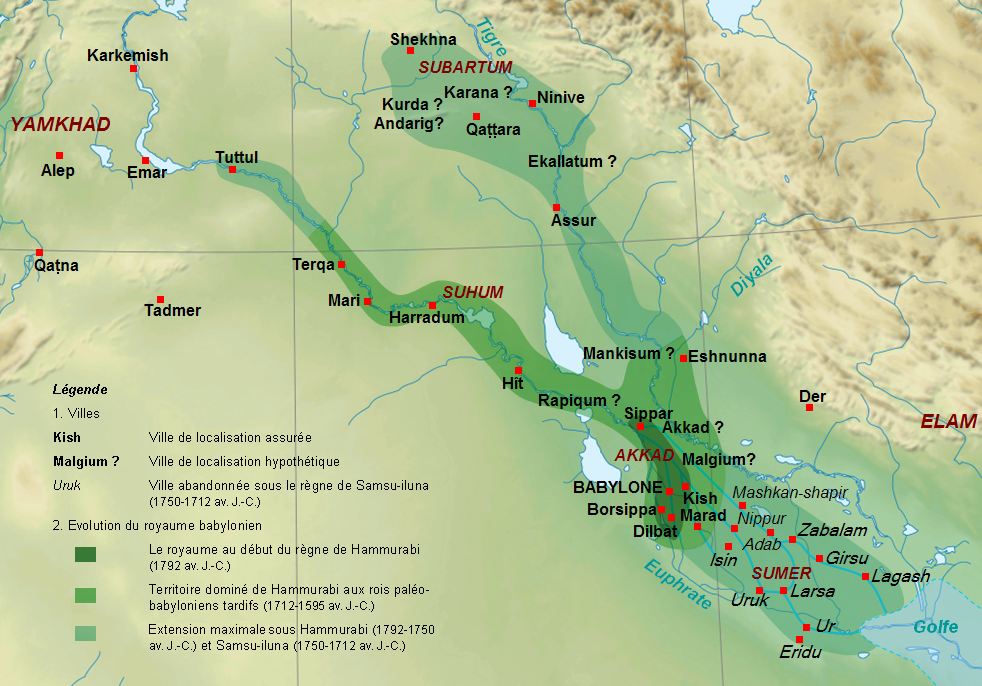
- The extent of the Old Babylonian Empire at the start and end of Hammurabi of Babylon's reign, c. 1792 BC – c. 1750 BC
- Capital: Babylon
- Common languages: Akkadian (official), Sumerian (literary), Amorite
- Religion: Babylonian religion
- Government: Monarchy
- King
  - c. 1894–1881 BC: Sumu-abum (first)
  - c. 1792–1750 BC: Hammurabi
  - c. 1626–1595 BC: Samsu-Ditana (last)
- Historical era: Bronze Age
  - Established: c. 1894 BC
  - Sack of Babylon: c. 1595 BC
  - Disestablished: c. 1595 BC
Preceded by	Succeeded by
Isin-Larsa period	Kassite dynasty; First Sealand dynasty
- Today part of: Iraq; Syria

A map of Iraq showing important sites that were occupied by the First Babylonian Dynasty (clickable map)

The Old Babylonian Empire, or First Babylonian Empire, is dated to c. 1894–1587 BC, and comes after the end of Sumerian power with the destruction of the Third Dynasty of Ur, and the subsequent Isin-Larsa period. The chronology of the first dynasty of Babylonia is debated; there is a Babylonian King List A and also a Babylonian King List B, with generally longer regnal lengths. In this chronology, the regnal years of List A are used due to their wide usage.

== Difficulty of searching for origins of the First Dynasty ==
The origins of the First Babylonian dynasty are hard to pinpoint because Babylon itself yields few archaeological materials intact due to a high water table. The evidence that survived throughout the years includes written records such as royal and votive inscriptions, literary texts, and lists of year-names. The minimal amount of evidence in economic and legal documents makes it difficult to illustrate the economic and social history of the First Babylonian Dynasty, but with historical events portrayed in literature and the existence of year-name lists, it is possible to establish a chronology.

== First kings of the dynasty ==
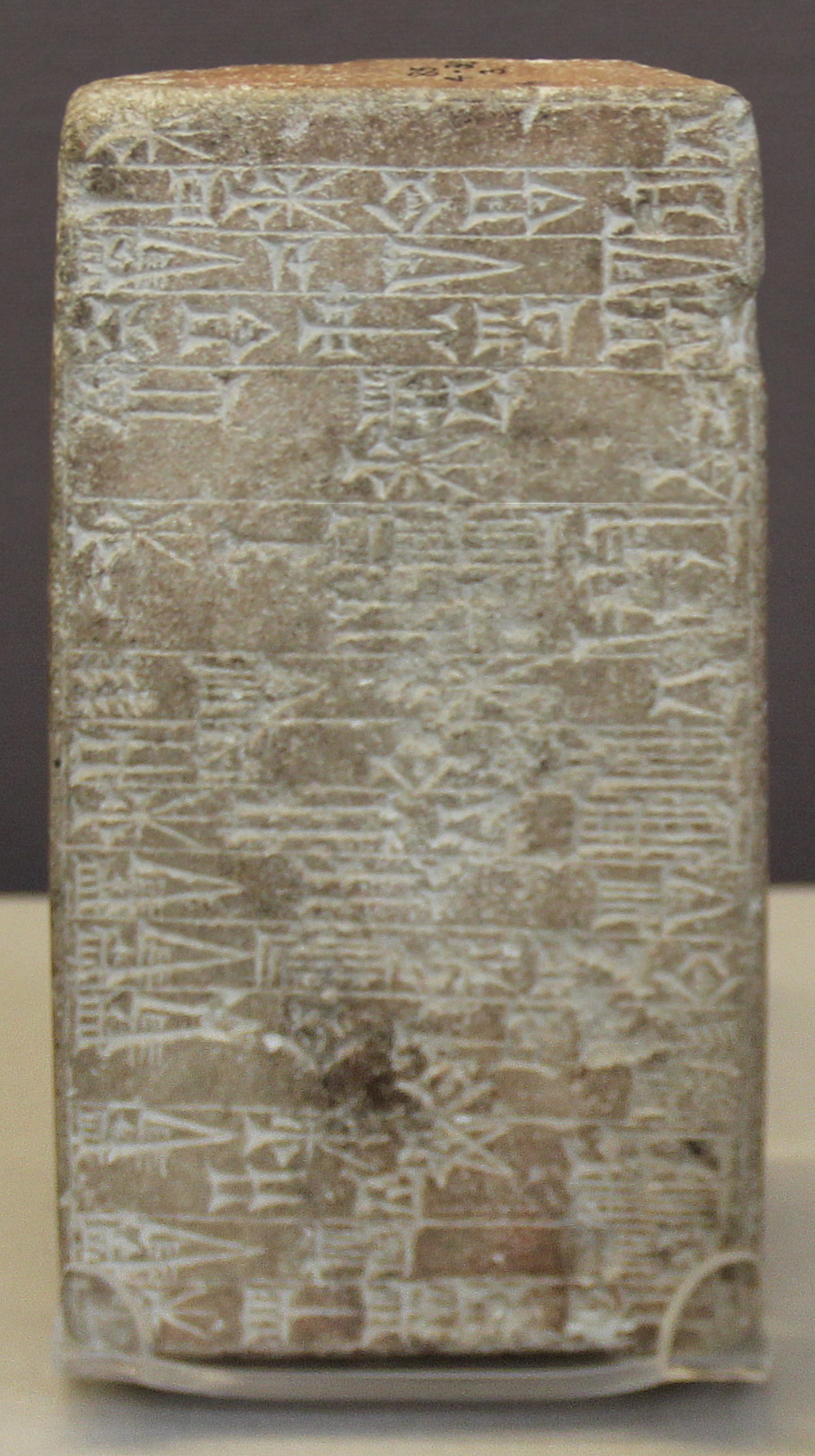
Tablet of Hammurabi (𒄩𒄠𒈬𒊏𒁉, 4th line from the top), King of Babylon. British Museum.

With little evidence on hand, there is not much known about the reigns of the kings from Sumuabum through Sin-muballit — other than the fact they were Amorites rather than Akkadians. What is known, however, is that they did not add much to the size of the territory. When the Amorite king Hammurabi came into power, his military victories were successful in gaining more land for the Empire. However, Babylon was just one of the several important powers among Isin and Larsa.

The accomplishments of the first known king of the Dynasty, Sumuabum, include his efforts in expanding Babylonian territory by conquering Dilbat and Kish. His successor, Sumualailum, was able to complete the wall around Babylon that Sumuabum had begun constructing. Sumualailum was also able to defeat rebellions in Kish and became successful in the destruction of Kazallu, and even had brief control over Nippur (though it did not last).

There is little information available about the reigns of Sabium, Apil-Sin and Sin-muballit, other than that they continued ruling the conquered territory, as well as strengthening the walls and began building canals. However, Sin-muballit is known for his successful defeats of Rim-Sin I, which protected Babylon from further invasion. Sin-muballit would then pass on the role of king to his son, Hammurabi.

== King Hammurabi ==
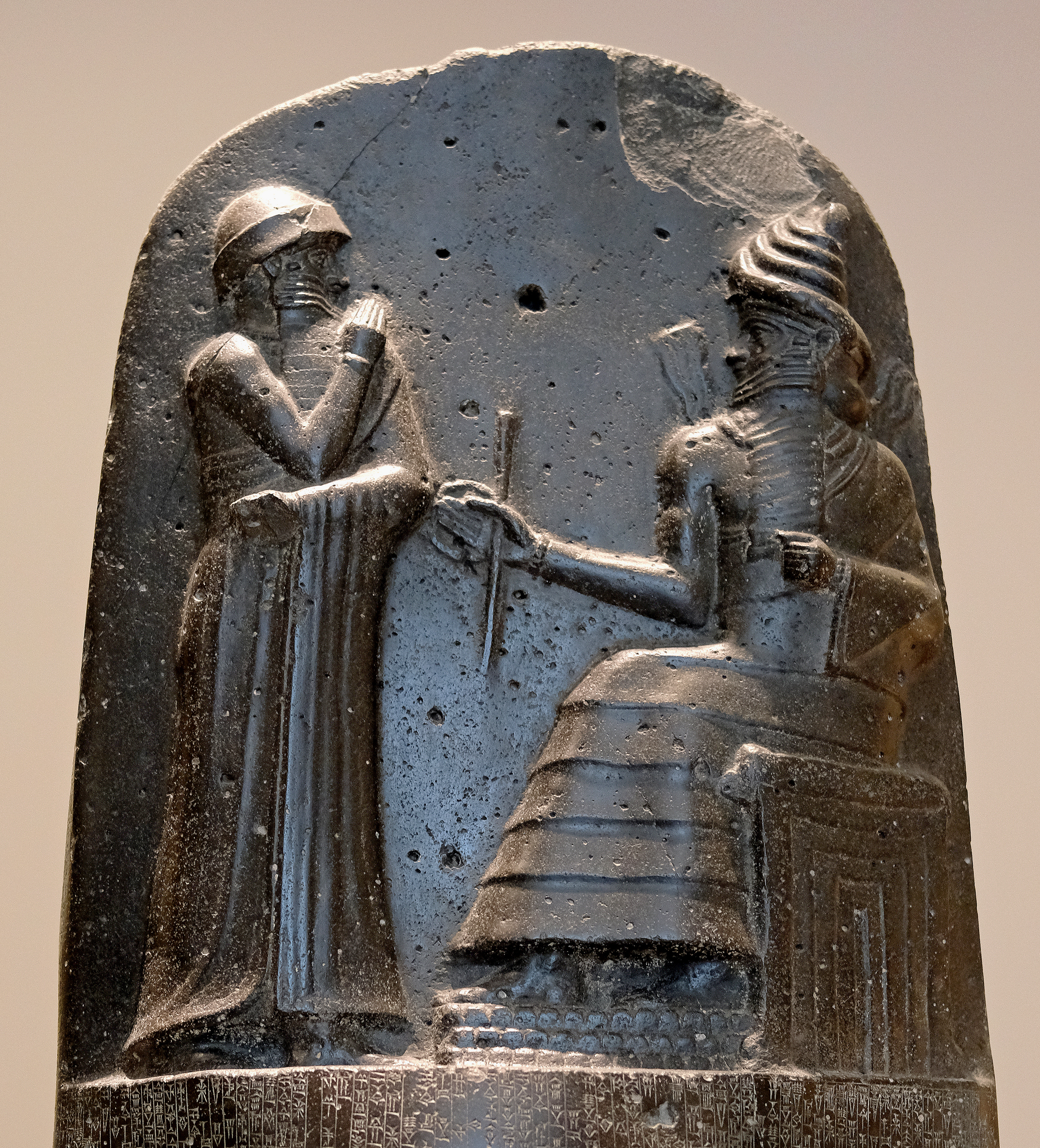
Hammurabi (standing), depicted as receiving his royal insignia from Shamash (or possibly Marduk). Hammurabi holds his hands over his mouth as a sign of prayer (relief on the upper part of the stele of Hammurabi's code of laws).

Code of Hammurabi

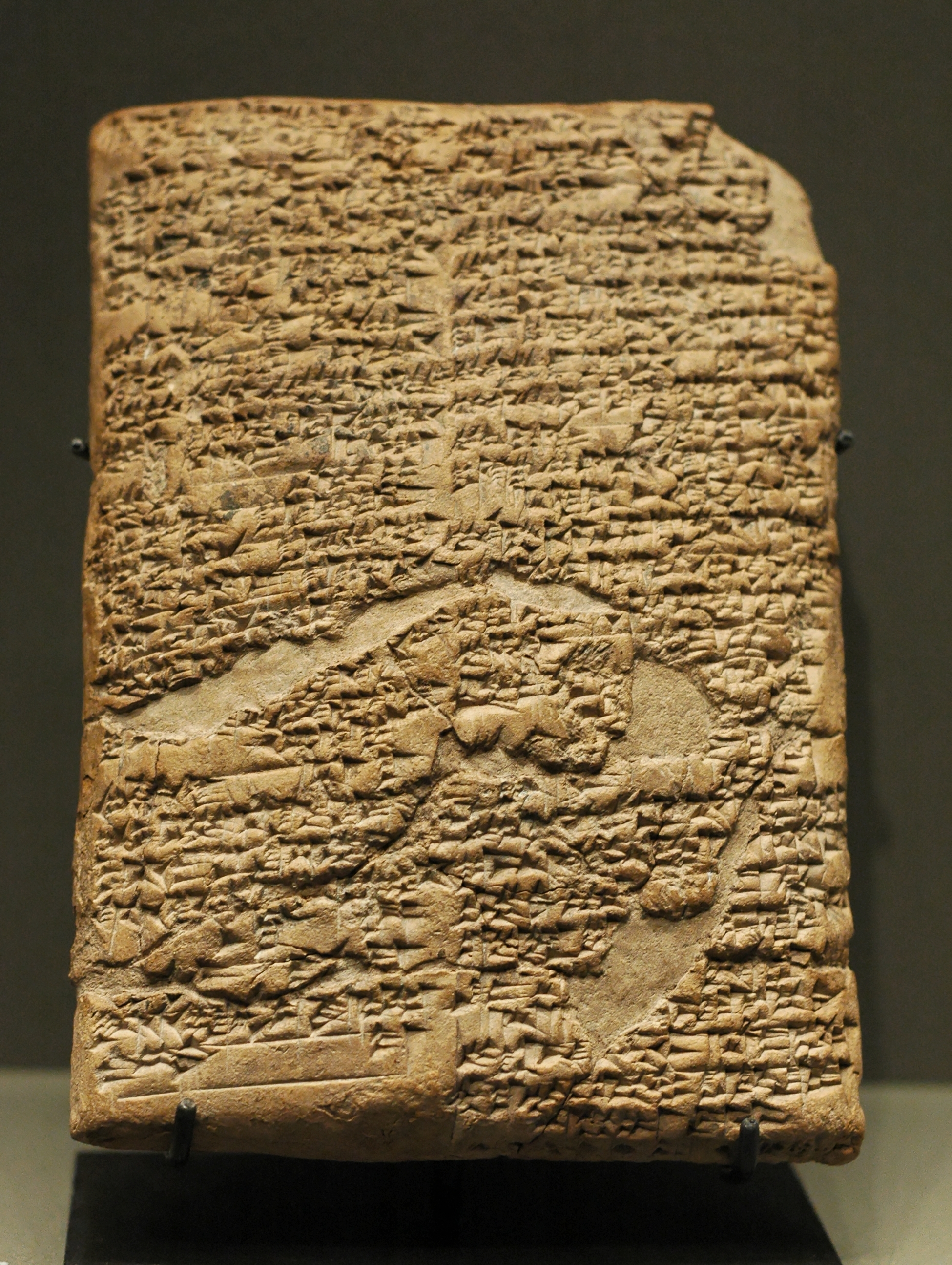
The code on clay tablets

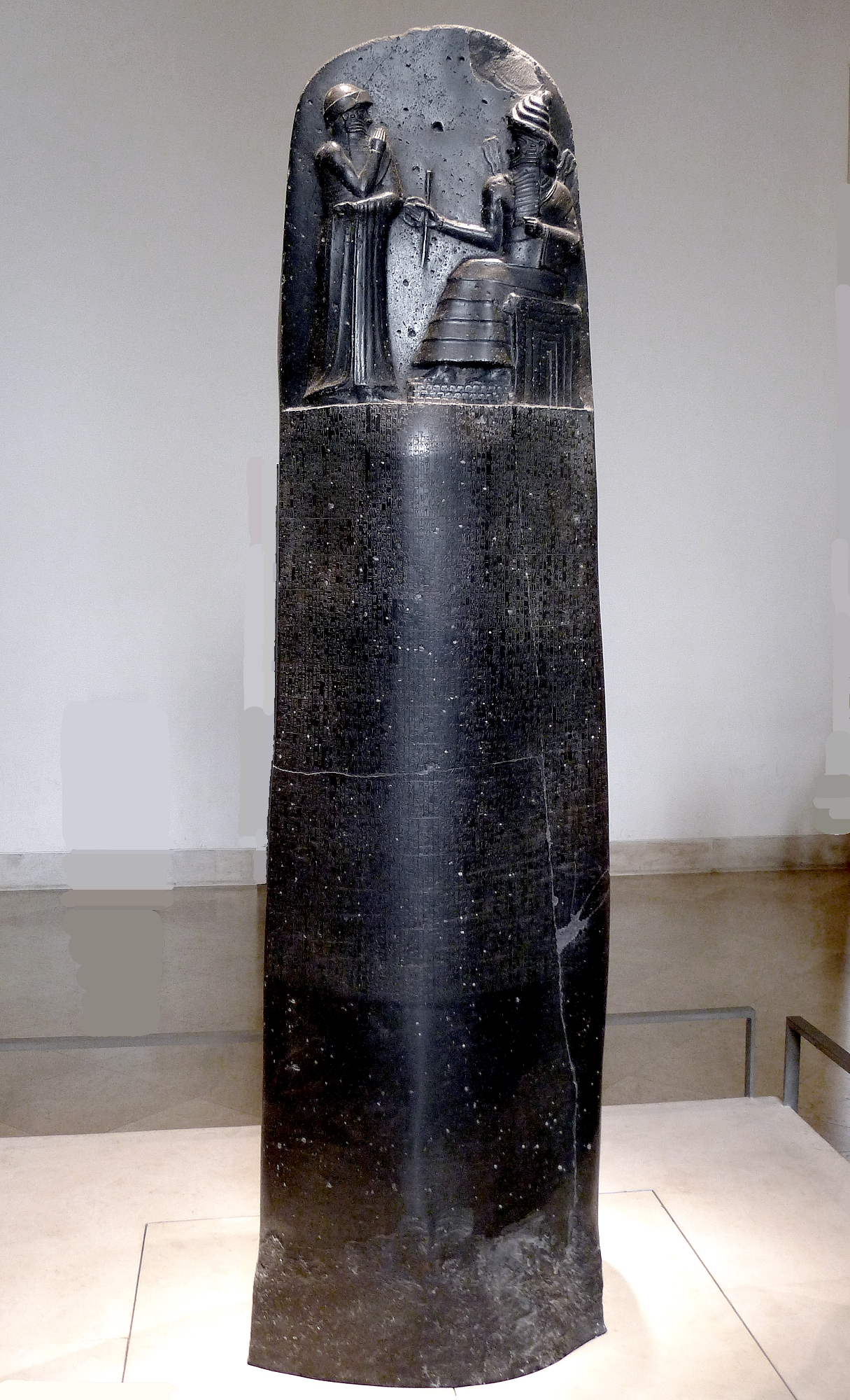
The code on a diorite stele

Two versions of the Code of Hammurabi at the Louvre

Hammurabi is also at times referred to as "Hammurapi" in ancient texts, including multiple primary-source Babylonian letters. This is a common phenomenon in Amorite names. (Another Amorite of the era, "Dipilirabi", is also known as "Dipilirapi".).

The Code of Hammurabi — one of the oldest written laws in history, and one of the most famous ancient texts from the Near East, and among the best known artifacts of the ancient world — is from the first Babylonian dynasty. The code is written in cuneiform on a 2.25 meter (7 foot 4½ inch) diorite stele. At the top, it portrays the Babylonian king receiving his kingship from the sun god Shamash; on the bottom is the collection of written laws. The text itself explains how Hammurabi came to power and created a set of laws to ensure justice throughout his territory — emphasizing that these are the divine roles that were given to him.

Before presenting the laws written in the Code, Hammurabi states, "When the god Marduk commanded me to provide just ways for the people of the land (in order to attain) appropriate behavior, I established truth and justice as the declaration of the land, I enhanced the well-being of the people." It then goes on to detail the laws of just punishment for crimes and provide rules for his people to abide.

King Hammurabi ruled Babylon from 1792 to 1750 BC. When he first came to power, the empire only consisted of a few towns in the area near Babylon: Dilbat, Sippar, Kish, and Borsippa. By 1762 BC, Hammurabi managed to succeed in capturing the formidable power of Eshnunna, inheriting its well-established trade routes and the economic stability that came along with them. It was not long before Hammurabi's armies took Assyria and parts of the Zagros Mountains. Eventually in 1761 BC, Babylon gained control over Mari, making up virtually all the territory of Mesopotamia that had been under the Third Dynasty of Ur.

During Hammurabi's thirtieth year as king, he conquered Larsa from Rim-Sin I, thus, gaining control over the lucrative urban centers of Nippur, Ur, Uruk, and Isin. Hammurabi was one of the most notable kings of the first Babylonian dynasty because of his success in gaining control over Southern Mesopotamia and establishing Babylon as the center of his Empire. Babylon would then come to dominate Mesopotamia for over a thousand years.

Zimri-Lim, king of the nearby polity of Mari, plays a significant role for modern historians. He contributed immense amounts of historical writing that describe the history and diplomacy of the first Babylonian dynasty during Hammurabi's reign. The archives of Hammurabi at the site of Babylon cannot be recovered, since its remains are under the local water table, and have practically turned to mud. But Zimri-Lim's palace at Mari held an archive that included letters and other texts that provide insight into the alliance between the king and Hammurabi, as well as other leaders in the Syro-Mesopotamian region. These documents survived because Hammurabi had burned the palace down — which buried the material, thus preserving it. War was a common occurrence for the kingdoms in Syria and Mesopotamia, so the majority of the documents from that era were in regard to military affairs. The documents included letters written by the messengers of the kings, discussing conflicts, divine oaths, agreements, and treaties between the powers.

== Hammurabi's successors ==
There is also little that is known about the kings who succeeded Hammurabi. The kings from Samsuiluna to Samsuditana have very few records of the occurrences during their reigns. However, we do know that Samsuiluna was successful in beating Rim-Sîn II, but nevertheless lost major parts of Babylon's conquered land — only having real authority over the core of the Babylonian territory left from Hammurabi's reign. The kings who succeeded Samsuiluna would face similar turmoil.

The first Babylonian dynasty eventually came to an end as the Empire lost territory and money, and faced great degradation. The attacks from Hittites who were trying to expand outside of Anatolia eventually led to the destruction of Babylon. The Kassite Period then followed the First Babylonian Dynasty, ruling from 1570 to 1154 BC. By the time of Babylon's fall the Kassites had already been part of the region for a century and a half, acting sometimes with Babylon's interests and sometimes against.

== The sun and astronomy in Babylonian history ==
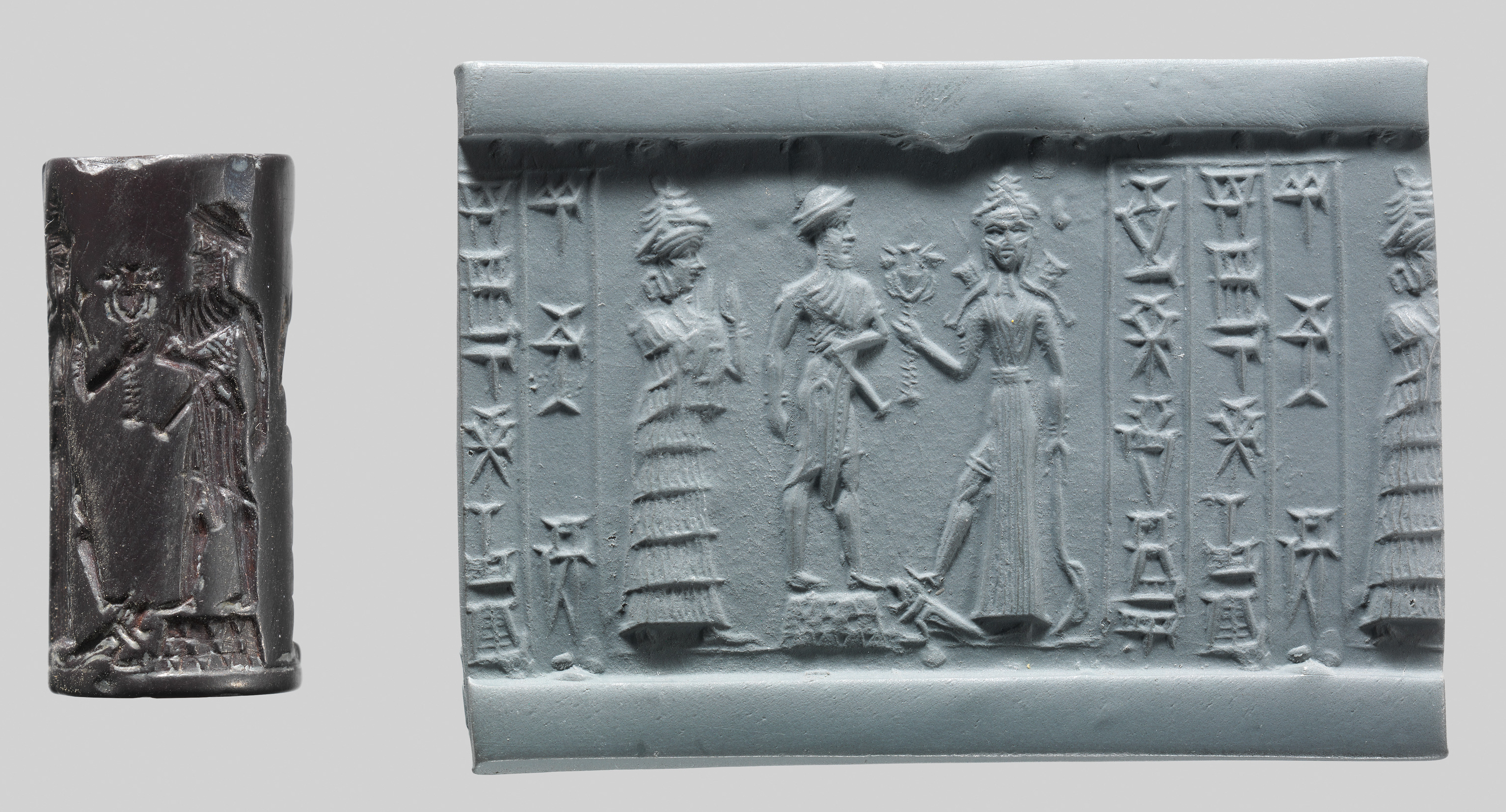
Cylinder seal, c. 18th–17th century BC. Babylonia

The sun played a role in the royal power of old Babylonia. Shamash was the god of the sun, of justice, and of divination, as was mentioned in the Code of Hammurabi. The text states, "May the god Shamash, the great judge of heaven and Earth, who provides just ways for all living creatures, the lord, my trust, overturn his kingship." Shamash was considered to have an influence on Hammurabi, and represented the concept that he will execute the laws of justice on land just as Shamash does in his role as a god.

A recent translation of the Chogha Gavaneh tablets from modern-day Iran, which date back to 1800 BC, indicates close contacts between Babylon and the town at the site of present-day Chogha Gavaneh, which is located in the intermontane valley of modern Islamabad in Iran's central Zagros and Dyala region.

A text about the fall of Babylon by the Hittites under Mursilis I (at the end of Samsuditana's reign over Babylon) tells a story about a twin eclipse — which is crucial for a correct Babylonian chronology. The pair of lunar and solar eclipses occurred in the month of Shimanu (Sivan). The lunar eclipse took place on February 9, 1659 BC. It started at 4:43 a.m. and ended at 6:47 a.m. The latter was invisible, which satisfies the record, and which also tells that the moon was still in eclipse. The solar eclipse occurred on February 23, 1659 BC. It started at 10:26 a.m., has its maximum at 11:45 a.m., and ended at 1:04 p.m.

The Venus tablets of Ammisaduqa (i.e., several ancient versions on clay tablets) are also well-known, and several books had been published about them. Several dates have been offered for their events, but the dates of many older sourcebooks seem to be outdated and incorrect. There are further difficulties: the 21-year span of the detailed observations of the planet Venus may or may not coincide with the reign of this king, because his name is not mentioned, only the Year of the Golden Throne.

A few sources, some printed almost a century ago, claim that the original text mentions an occultation of Venus by the moon. However, this may be a misinterpretation. Modern calculations support the year of 1659 BC for the fall of Babylon, based on the statistical probability of the planet's observations. The presently-accepted middle chronology is too low from the astronomical point of view.

== Seals ==
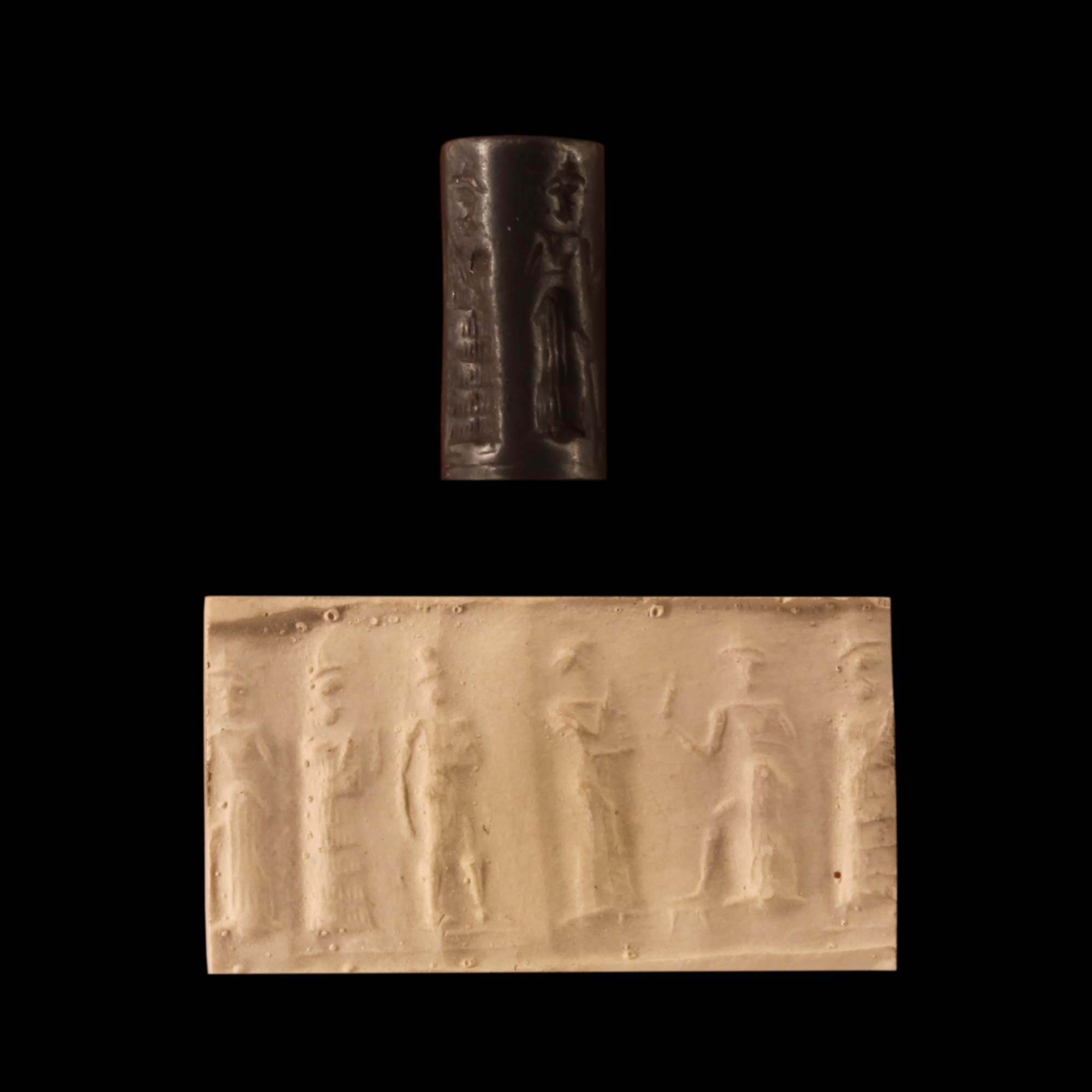
Devotion scene

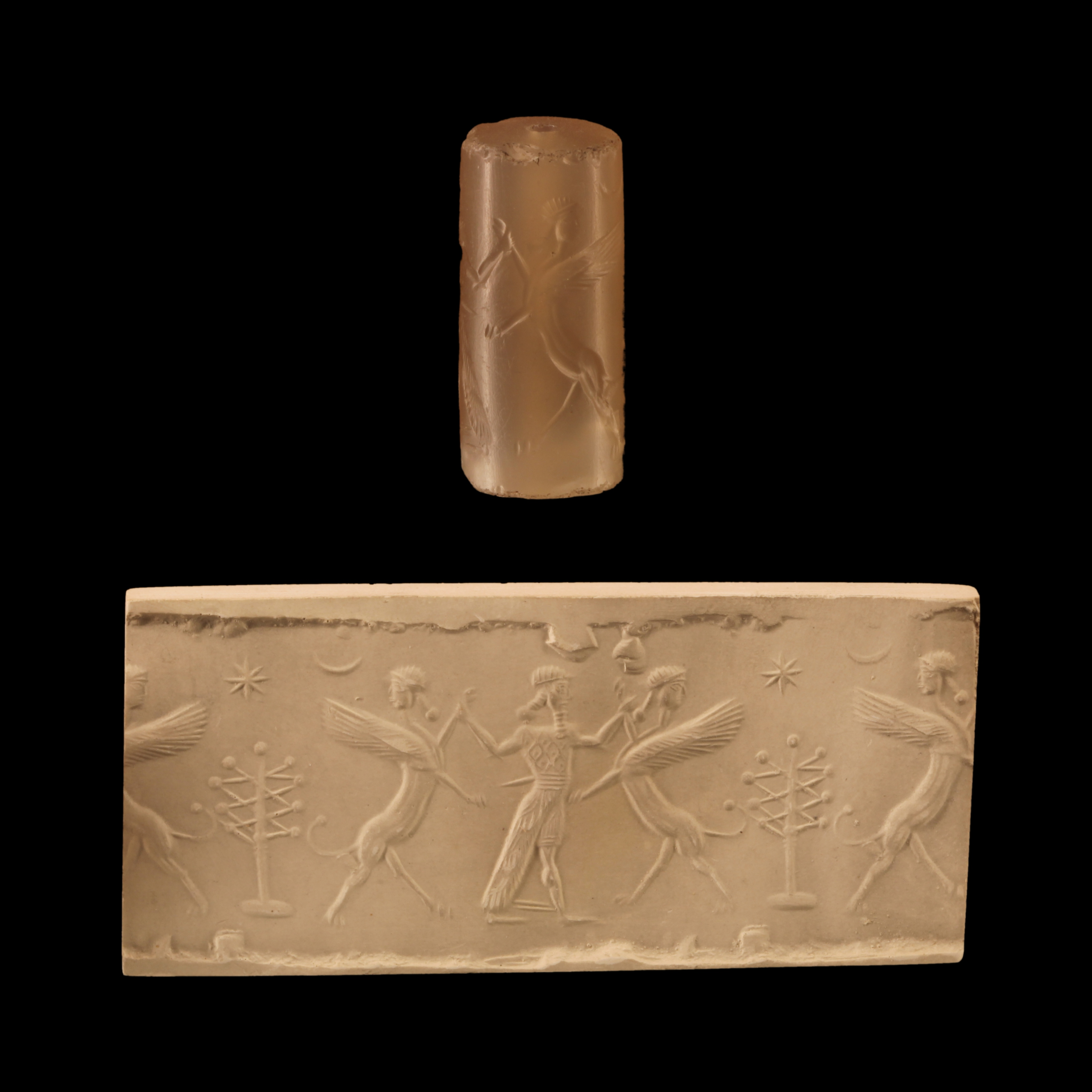
Hero fighting two winged demons

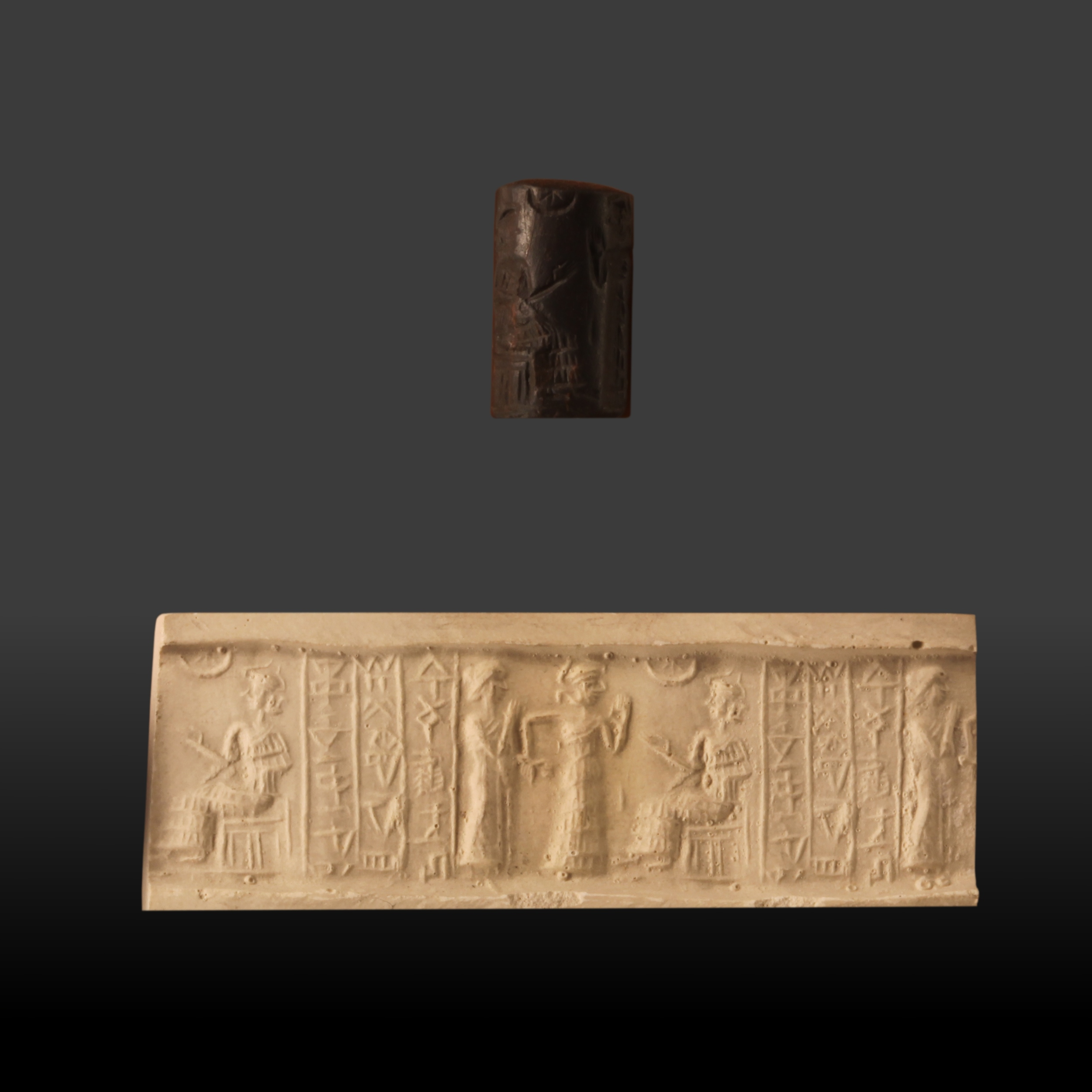
Presentation to a divinity

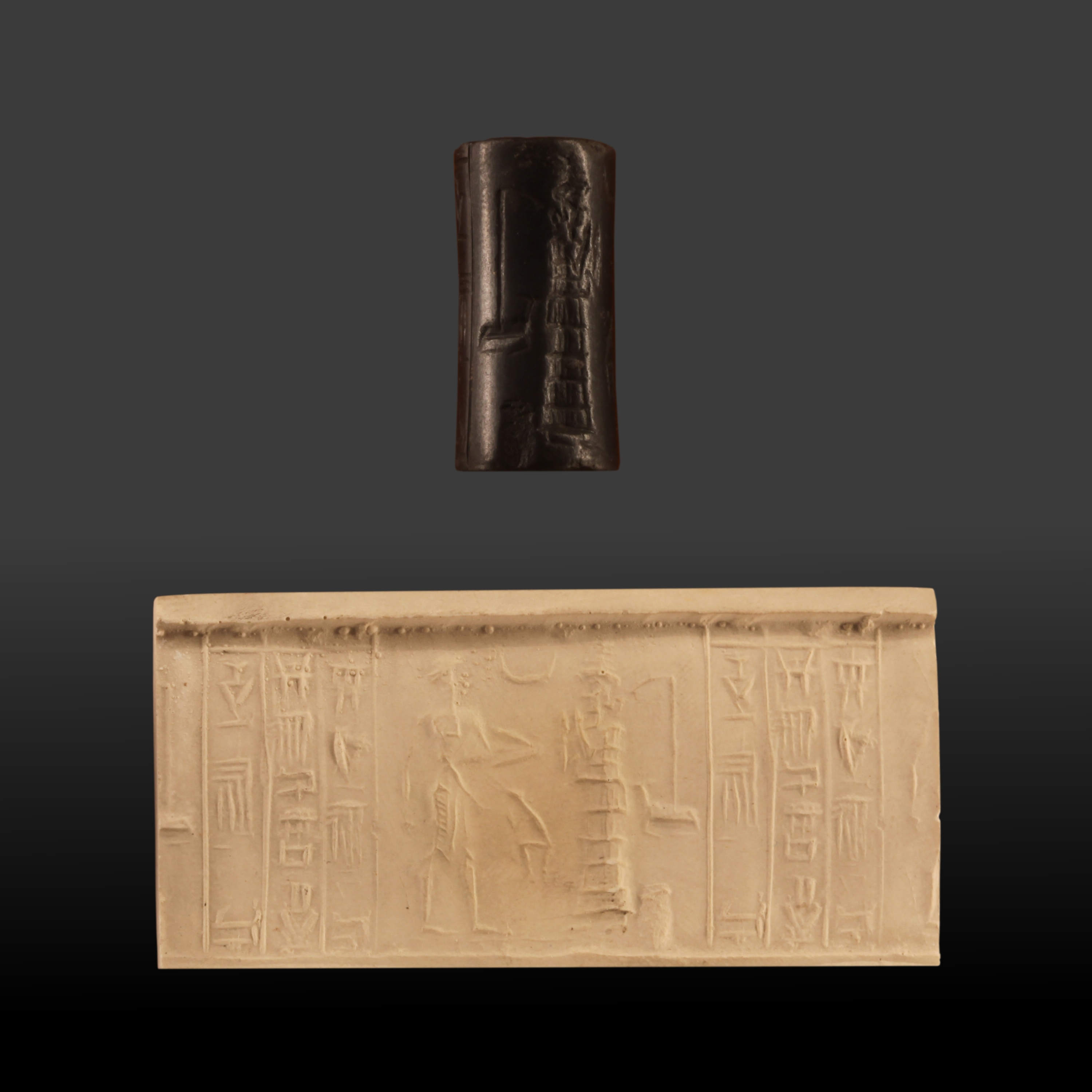
Scene of devotion with inscription

== List of rulers ==
#	Depiction	Name	Succession	Title	Approx. dates	Notes
1		Sumuabum Šumu-abum	Unclear succession	King of Babylon	r. c. 1894 – c. 1881 BC (MC) r. c. 1830 – c. 1817 BC (SC) (14 years)	temp. of: Ilushuma; First named king on the Babylonian King List (BKL)
2		Sumulael Šumu-la-El	Unclear succession	King of Babylon	r. c. 1881 – c. 1845 BC (MC) r. c. 1817 – c. 1781 BC (SC) (36 years)	temp. of: Erishum I
3		Sabum Sabūm	Son of Sumulael	King of Babylon	r. c. 1845 – c. 1831 BC (MC) r. c. 1781 – c. 1767 BC (SC) (14 years)	temp. of: Naramsuen
4		Apil-Sin Apil-Sîn	Son of Sabum	King of Babylon	r. c. 1831 – c. 1813 BC (MC) r. c. 1767 – c. 1749 BC (SC) (17 years)	temp. of: Erishum II
5		Sin-muballit Sîn-Muballit	Son of Apil-Sin	King of Babylon	r. c. 1813 – c. 1792 BC (MC) r. c. 1748 – c. 1729 BC (SC) (19 years)	temp. of: Damiq-ilishu
6		Hammurabi Ḫammu-rāpi	Son of Sin-muballit	King of Babylon King of the Four Corners King of Sumer and Akkad	r. c. 1792 – c. 1750 BC (MC) r. c. 1728 – c. 1686 BC (SC) (43 years)	First major ruler; temp. of: Zimri-Lim; Siwe-Palar-Khuppak; Shamshi-Adad I; b. c. 1810 BC; d. c. 1750 BC
7		Samsuiluna Šamšu-iluna	Son of Hammurabi	King of Babylon King of Larsa	r. c. 1750 – c. 1712 BC (MC) r. c. 1686 – c. 1648 BC (SC) (38 years)	temp. of: Gandash; Ilum-ma-ili; Ishme-Dagan I; d. c. 1712 BC
8		Abieshu Abī-Ešuḫ	Son of Samsuiluna	King of Babylon	r. c. 1712 – c. 1684 BC (MC) r. c. 1648 – c. 1620 BC (SC) (28 years)	temp. of: Agum I; Itti-ili-nibi; Adasi
9		Ammiditana Ammi-ditāna	Son of Abieshu	King of Babylon	r. c. 1684 – c. 1647 BC (MC) r. c. 1620 – c. 1583 BC (SC) (37 years)	temp. of: Abi-Rattash; Ishkibal; Sharma-Adad I
10		Ammisaduqa Ammi-Saduqa	Son of Ammiditana	King of Babylon	r. c. 1647 – c. 1626 BC (MC) r. c. 1582 – c. 1562 BC (SC) (21 years)	temp. of: Shushushi; Bazaya; Also known from the Venus tablet of Ammisaduqa.
11		Samsuditana Šamšu-ditāna	Son of Ammisaduqa	King of Babylon	r. c. 1626 – c. 1595 BC (MC) r. c. 1562 – c. 1531 BC (SC) (31 years)	temp. of: Kashtiliash II; Gulkishar; Lullaya; Known primarily due to the Sack of Babylon by the Hittites.

== See also ==
- Chronology of the Ancient Near East
- Kings of Babylon
- List of lists of ancient kings
- List of Mesopotamian dynasties
- Short chronology timeline
- Timeline of the Assyrian Empire
