= Sumu-abum =

First king of the First Dynasty of Babylon

1st King of Babylon
- Reign: c. 1894-1881 BC
- Predecessor: Monarchy established
- Successor: Sumu-la-El
- Died: c. 1881 BC

Location of Babylon

Sūmû-abum (also Su-abu or Sūmabum) was an Amorite, and the first King of the First Dynasty of Babylon (the Amorite Dynasty). He reigned c. 1894–1881 BC (MC). In this period after the fall of the Ur III Empire the city-states of Isin and Larsa were the major powers in the region. He freed a small area of land previously ruled by the fellow Amorite city state of Kazallu which included Babylon, then a minor administrative center in southern Mesopotamia. Sumu-abum (and the three Amorite kings succeeding him) makes no claim to be King of Babylon, suggesting that the town was at this time still of little importance. He is known to have become king of Kisurra. An alternative view is that the Sumu-abum controlling Kisurra was actually a ruler in the 6th Dynasty of Uruk, preceding Sîn-kāšid. He controlled the city of Dilbat 25 kilometers south of Babylon, recording the building of its city wall in his 9th year of rule. In his 3rd year of rule he claimed to have conquered the city of Elip, a major city of the Manana Dynasty. By year 10 of his reign, Sumu-abum had gained control of Kish, 12 kilometers east of Babylon, which had been controlled by the Manana dynasty for some time. It was then briefly lost to Larsa but recovered by Sūmû-abum in his 13th reigning year. While Kish was no longer a powerful city, it maintained its outsized symbolic importance. Because the Old Babylonian period archaeological levels at the city of Babylon were below the water table and not excavated what is known about Sumu-abum is from other sites like Kazallu, Dilbat, Sippar, and Kisurra.

About 14 year names of Sumu-abum are known, notably:

- Year the great city wall of Babylon was built
- Year the city wall of Elip was seized
- Year the temple of Ninisina was built
- Year (the temple) Emah of Nanna was built
- Year the city wall of Dilbat was built
- Year in which (Sumu-abum) made for Kish its city wall (reaching) heaven
- Year Sumu-abum destroyed / seized Kazallu

He should not be confused with Isi-sümü-abum of the same period who ruled a city as yet unknown. On a tablet found at Sippar, BM 80328, there is a list of rulers of Babylon with 14 unknown rulers before Sūmû-abum including "A-ra-am-ma-da-ra, Tu-ub-ti-ya-mu-ta, Ya-am-qu-uz-zu-ha-lam-ma, He-a-na, Nam-zu-u, Di-ta-nu, Zu-um-ma-bu, Nam-hu-u, Am-na-nu, Ya-ah-ru-rum, Ip-ti-ya-mu-ta, Bu-ha-zu-um, Su-ma-li-ka, As-ma-du".

== See also ==
- List of Mesopotamian dynasties
- Chronology of the ancient Near East

Regnal titles
Preceded by Monarchy established	King of Babylon c. 1894 – c. 1881 BC	Succeeded by Sumu-la-El
