= Sumu-la-El =

Babylonian king

2nd King of Babylon
- Reign: c. 1881–1845 BC
- Predecessor: Sumu-abum
- Successor: Sabium
- Died: c. 1845 BC
- Issue: Sallurtum

Location of Babylon

Sumu-la-El (also Sumulael or Sumu-la-ilu) was a King in the First Dynasty of Babylon. He reigned c. 1881–1845 BC (MC). He was a contemporary of Sîn-kāšid of Uruk and with Sūmu-El and Nur-Adad or Larsa.During this period Babylon contested with the city-state of Isin for control of the local region. He subjugated and conquered nearby cities like Kish and built a string of fortresses around his territory. He is known to have conquered the city of Sippar. Economic ties extended as far north as Tilmen Hoyuk. His daughter, Šallurtum, married Sîn-kāšid, the king of Uruk. Because the Old Babylonian period archaeological levels at the city of Babylon were below the water table and not excavated what is known about Sumu-la-el is from other sites like Sippar and Marad which Babylon controlled. In the first half of Sumu-la-el's reign Marad had an independent kingdom which also controlled Dilbat.

About 36 year names of Sumu-la-el are known, notably :

- Year Sumu-la-el built the city wall of Dilbat
- Year Alumbiumu (Kazallu) was smitten by weapons
- Year the great city wall of Babylon was built
- Year the temple of Adad was built
- Year Kish was destroyed
- Year Iahzir-el was driven out of Kazallu
- Year the city wall of Kazallu was destroyed and his army was smitten by weapons
- Year the city walls of Kutha and Anzagar-urgi were built
- Year in which Sumu-la-el entered Borsippa
- Year Sumu-la-el the king built the city wall of Sippar
- Year the temple of Zababa (the Emeteursag) was built by Sumu-la-el
- Year the great city wall of Habuz was built

In a text from the time of later Babylon ruler Apil-Sîn, found at Sippar, a case was recorded adjudicated by Apil-Sin " ... the houses which Sumulael had given them, Nur-ilisu laid claim, but they obtained an audience with King Apil-Sin and he returned their houses to them.". One of the witnesses was Ayyalatum, daughter of earlier ruler Sumu-la-el.

== See also ==
- List of Mesopotamian dynasties
- Chronology of the ancient Near East

Regnal titles
Preceded by Sumu-abum	King of Babylon c. 1881 – c. 1845 BC	Succeeded by Sabium
