= Apil-Sin =

Amorite king

Apil-Sîn

King of Babylon
- Reign: c. 1831 – c. 1813 BC
- Predecessor: Sabium
- Successor: Sin-Muballit
- Died: c. 1813 BC
- Issue: Sin-Muballit

Location of Babylon

Apil-Sîn was an Amorite King of the First Dynasty of Babylon (the Amorite Dynasty). He was the grandfather of Hammurabi, who significantly expanded the Babylonian kingdom. In the time of Apil-Sin Babylon was in the process of developing into a local empire, primarily contesting with the city-state of Isin for territory in the region. His regnal length is not known with absolute certainly but ran at least 18 years based on the number of attested year names. Because the Old Babylonian period archaeological levels at the city of Babylon were below the water table and not excavated what is known about Apil-Sin is from other sites like Sippar, Kish, and Marad, which Babylon controlled. One side effect is that only one text from Apil-Sîn is known, beginning "Thus says Apil-Sîn, your lord". In one texts found at Sippar a case was recorded adjudicated by Apil-Sin " ... the houses which Sumulael had given them, Nur-ilisu laid claim, but they obtained an audience with King Apil-Sin and he returned their houses to them.". One of the witnesses was Ayyalatum, daughter of earlier ruler Sumulael.

It is known that Apil-Sîn built a fortress named Dur-Apil-Sîn. The Babylonian ruler Nebuchadnezzar wrote "I sought not the battle, I retreated to Dur Apil Sîn, I sat down defeated.".

About 17 year names of Apil-Sîn are known, notably:

- Year Apil-Sîn the king built the city wall of Borsippa
- Year Apil-Sîn built a magnificent new city wall for Babylon
- Year Apil-Sîn the king built the city wall of Durmuti/Nurum
- Year Apil-Sîn restored (the temple) Emeslam / the Ezida temple
- Year Apil-Sîn built the temple of Inanna in Elip
- Year Apil-Sîn built the Eturkalama, the sheepfold of the land, the temple of Inanna in Babylon
- Year Apil-Sîn built the wall of Kār-šamaš on the bank of the Tigris

Another year name "Year Apil-Sîn the king entered Astabala" is generally taken as meaning Apil-Sin conquered that city which is unlocated but known to have been on the Tigris river. Similarly the year name "Year Apil-Sîn built (the city wall of) Upi/Opis" is generally taken to mean that Babylon controlled the city of Opis at that time.

In the 1st millennium BC literary composition Esagila Chronicle Damiq-ilīšu, king of the First Dynasty of Isin gives adviceto Apil-Sîn in proper conduct based on lessons from history.

In a chronicle fragment of Neo-Babylonian date (BM 29297) it states "Apil-Sîn, the son of Sabu, during his reign, he did not rule any part of the Sealands".

== See also ==
- Chronology of the ancient Near East
- List of Mesopotamian dynasties

Regnal titles
Preceded by Sabium	King of Babylon c. 1831 – c. 1813 BC	Succeeded by Sin-Muballit
