= Sin-Muballit =

King of Babylon

King of Babylon
- Reign: c. 1813 – c. 1792 BC
- Predecessor: Apil-Sin
- Successor: Hammurabi
- Died: c. 1792 BC
- Issue: Hammurabi
- Father: Apil-Sin

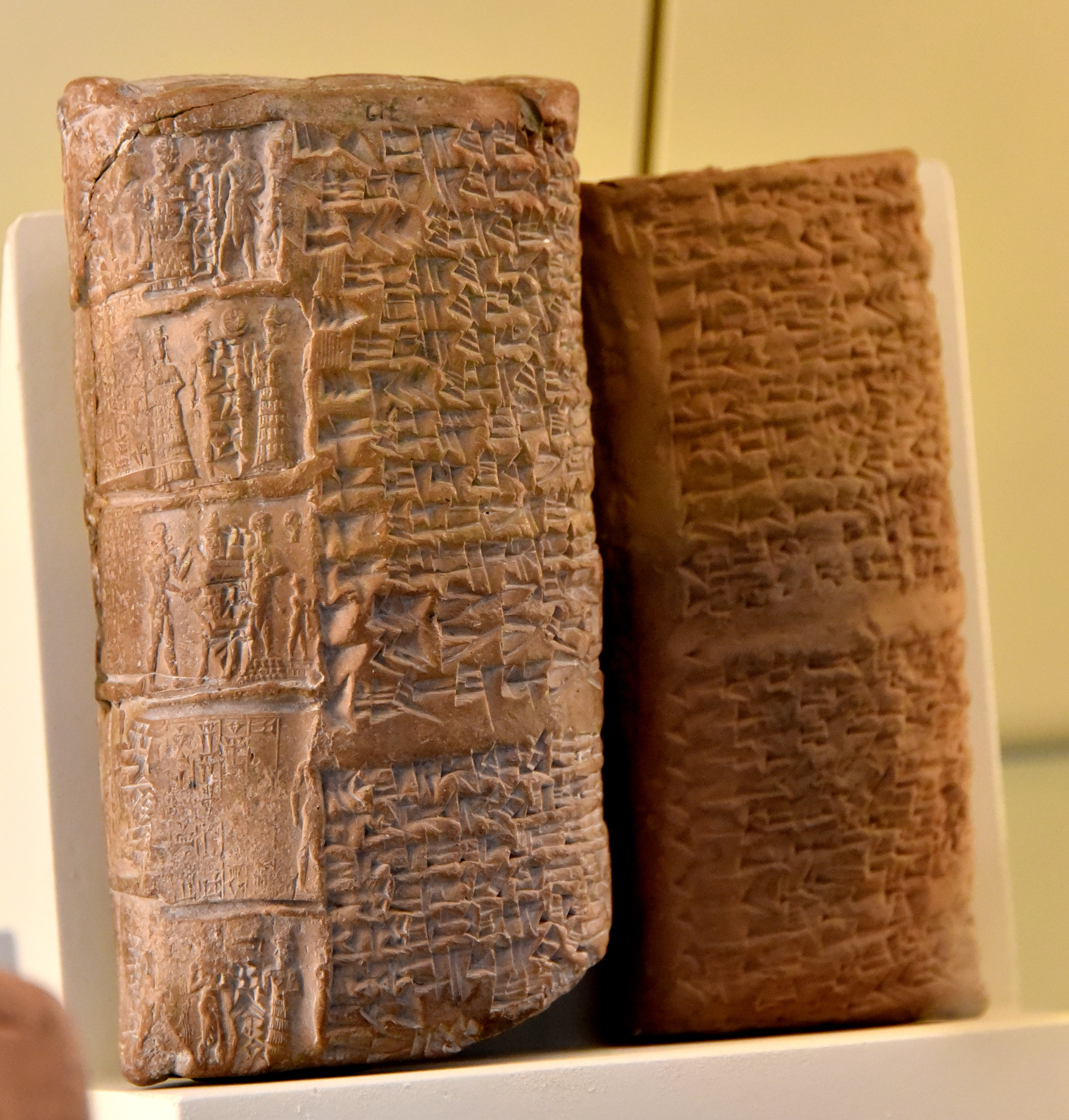
Clay tablet and its sealed clay envelope. Legal document, listing of land and their distribution to several sons. From Sippar, Iraq. Old-Babylonian period. Reign of Sin-Muballit, c. 1813-1792 BC. Vorderasiatisches Museum, Berlin, Germany.

Sin-Muballit (died c. 1792 BC) was the father of Hammurabi and the fifth Amorite king of the first dynasty (the Amorite Dynasty) of Babylonia. He ruled over a relatively new and minor kingdom; however, he was the first ruler of Babylon to actually declare himself king of the city, and the first to expand the territory ruled by the city, and his son greatly expanded the Babylonian kingdom into the Babylonian Empire.

== Reign ==
Sin-Muballit succeeded his father Apil-Sin. No inscriptions for either king are known. A record of 19 year-names are preserved.

1799 BC | In Sin-Muballlit's 13th year, he repelled the army of Larsa, which was frequently in conflict with Babylon.

1795 BC | In the 17th year of his reign, Sin-Muballit took possession of the city of Isin and his power grew steadily over time as evidenced by his building and fortifying a number of towns. He abdicated his throne to his son Hammurabi due to failing health.

== See also ==
- Chronology of the ancient Near East
- List of Mesopotamian dynasties

Preceded by Apil-Sin	King of Babylon c. 1813 – c. 1792 BC	Succeeded by Hammurabi
