= Sargon I =

Assyrian ruler

- Issi'ak Assur
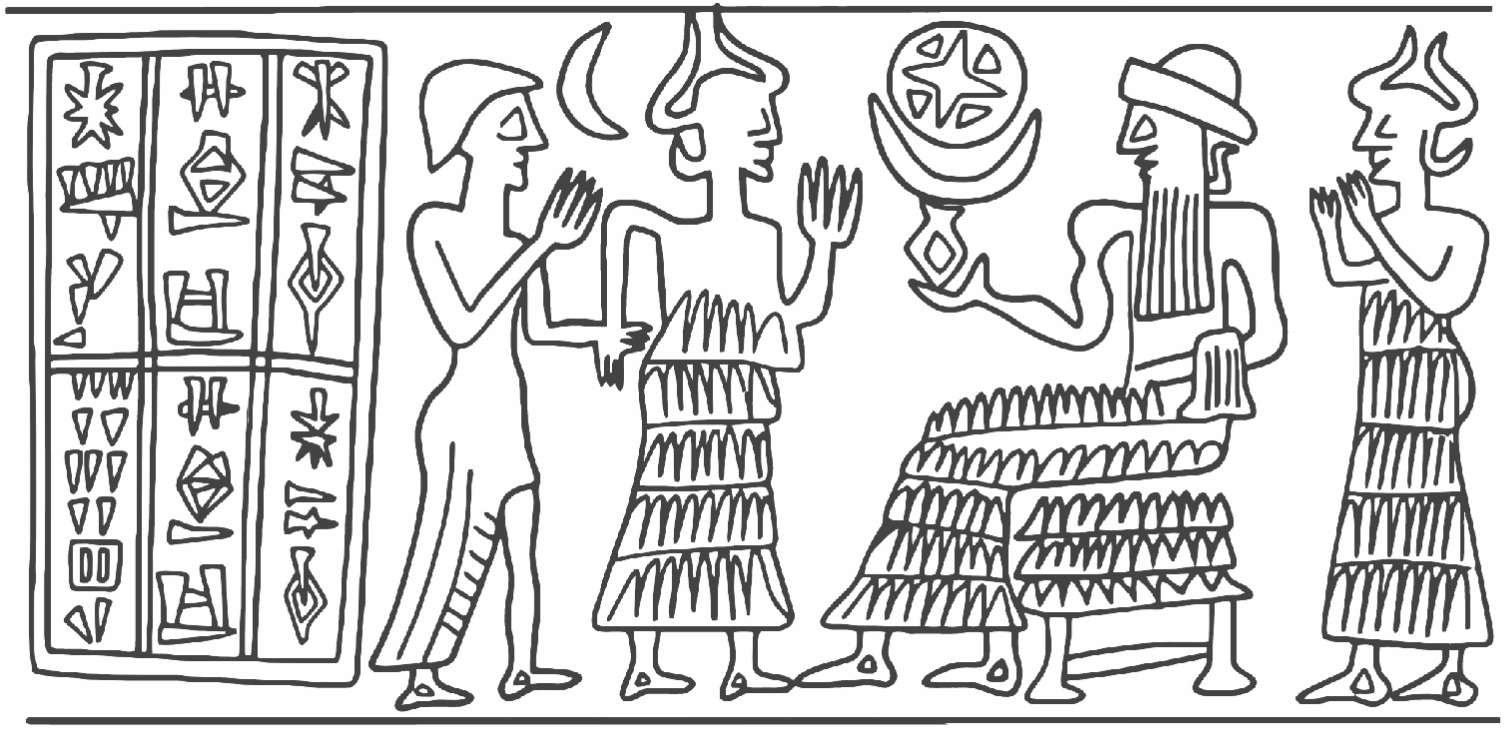
- Line-drawing of a seal of Sargon I from Kültepe. The seated figure is believed to be the god Ashur, with Sargon being the figure furthest to the left being led towards him.

King of Assyria
- Reign: c. 1921 – c. 1881 BC
- Predecessor: Ikunum
- Successor: Puzur-Ashur II
- Died: c. 1881 BC
- Issue: Puzur-Ashur II
- Father: Ikunum

Sargon I was the king (Išši’ak Aššur, "Steward of Assur"; died c. 1881 BC) during the Old Assyrian period from c. 1921 BC to 1881 BC.

== Reign ==
On the Assyrian King List, Sargon appears as the son and successor of Ikunum, and the father and predecessor of Puzur-Ashur II.

The name "Sargon" (also transcribed as Šarru-kīn I and Sharru-ken I) means "the king is legitimate" in Akkadian. Sargon I might have been named after Sargon of Akkad, both Akkad and Assyria being Akkadian-speaking Mesopotamian states, perhaps reflecting the extent to which Sargon I identified with the prestigious Dynasty of Akkad in a similar way to Naram-Sin of Assyria likely being named after the Akkadian king of the same name.

Sargon I is known for his work refortifying Assur, the Assyrian capital. Very little is otherwise yet known about Sargon I, although he presided over Assyria's trading colonies (Karum) in southeast Anatolia, the most prominent being Kanish (modern Kultepe), where his limmu lists have been uncovered.

=== Limmu Year-names ===
The following is a list of the 41 annually-elected limmu officials from the year of accession of Sargon I until the year of his death. Dates are based on a date of 1833 BC for the solar eclipse recorded in the limmu of Puzur-Ishtar:

1920 BC Irišum son of Iddin-Aššur
1919 BC Aššur-malik son of Agatum
1918 BC Aššur-malik son of Enania
1917 BC Ibisua son of Suen-nada
1916 BC Bazia son of Bal-Tutu
1915 BC Puzur-Ištar son of Sabasia
1914 BC Pišaḫ-Ili son of Adin
1913 BC Asqudum son of Lapiqum
1912 BC Ili-pilaḫ son of Damqum
1911 BC Qulali
1910 BC Susaya
1909 BC Amaya the Weaponer
1908 BC Ipḫurum son of Ili-ellat
1907 BC Kudanum son of Laqipum
1906 BC Ili-bani son of Ikunum
1905 BC Šu-Kubum son of Susaya
1904 BC Quqidi son of Amur-Aššur
1903 BC Abia son of Nur-Suen
1902 BC Šu-Ištar son of Šukutum
1901 BC Bazia son of Šepa-lim
1900 BC Šu-Ištar son of Ikunum, the starlike (kakkabanum)
1899 BC Abia son of Šu-Dagan
1898 BC Salia son of Šabakuranum
1897 BC Ibni-Adad son of Baqqunum
1896 BC Aḫmarši son of Malkum-išar
1895 BC Sukkalia son of Minanum
1894 BC Iddin-Aššur son of Kubidi
1893 BC Šudaya son of Ennanum
1892 BC Al-ṭab son of Pilaḫ-Aššur
1891 BC Aššur-dammiq son of Abarsisum
1890 BC Puzur-Niraḫ son of Puzur-Suen
1889 BC Amur-Aššur son of Karria
1888 BC Buzuzu son of Ibbi-Suen
1887 BC Šu-Ḫubur son of Elali
1886 BC Ilšu-rabi son of Bazia
1885 BC Alaḫum son of Inaḫ-ili
1884 BC Ṭab-Aššur son of Suḫarum
1883 BC Elali son of Ikunum
1882 BC Iddin-abum son of Narbitum
1881 BC Adad-bani son of Iddin-Aššur
1880 BC Aššur-iddin son of Šuli

Preceded by Ikunum	King of Assyria c. 1921 – c. 1881 BC	Succeeded by Puzur-Ashur II
