= Puzur-Ashur II =

Assyrian king

King of Assyria
- Reign: c. 1881 – c. 1873 BC
- Predecessor: Sargon I
- Successor: Naram-Sin
- Died: c. 1873 BC
- Issue: Naram-Sin
- Father: Sargon I

Puzur-Ashur II (also transcribed as Puzur-Aššur II; died c. 1873 BC) was king (Išši’ak Aššur, "Steward of Assur") during the Old Assyrian period c. 1881 to 1873 BC. Puzur-Ashur II had been both the son and successor of Sargon I. Due to Sargon I's long reign, Puzur-Ashur II came to the throne at such a late age that one of his sons, named Ili-bani was a witness in a contract (and so already a grown man) 11 years before Puzur-Ashur II became ruler. Puzur-Ashur II was succeeded by his son Naram-Sin. The following is a list of the nine annually-elected "limmu" ("eponym") officials from the year of accession of Puzur-Ashur II, the "waklum" ("overseer"), in the limmu of Ashur-iddin (son of Shuli) to Puzur-Ashur II's death in the limmu of Inaya (son of Amuraya.) BC dates are based on a date of 1833 BC for the recorded solar eclipse in the limmu of Puzur-Ištar:

1880 BC Aššur-iddin son of Šuli
1879 BC Aššur-nada son of Puzur-Ana
1878 BC Kubia son of Karria
1877 BC Ili-dan son of Elali
1876 BC Ṣilulu son of Uku
1875 BC Aššur-nada son of Ili-binanni
1874 BC Ikuppi-Ištar son of Ikua
1873 BC Buzutaya son of Šuli
1872 BC Innaya son of Amuraya

| Preceded by Sargon I | King of Assyria c. 1881 – c. 1873 BC | Succeeded by Naram-Sin |
