= Naram-Sin of Assyria =

Old Assyrian king

Naram-Sin
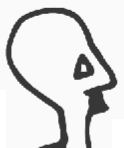

King of Assyria
- Reign: c. 1873 – c. 1823 BC
- Predecessor: Puzur-Ashur II
- Successor: Erishum II
- Died: c. 1823 BC
- Issue: Erishum II
- Father: Puzur-Ashur II

Naram-Sin, or Narām-Sîn or –Suen (died c. 1823 BC) inscribed in cuneiform on contemporary seal impressions as ^{d}na-ra-am-^{d}EN.ZU, had been the "waklum" (ugula, Overseer) or "Išši’ak Aššur" (énsi ^{d}a-šùr, Steward of Ashur) of the city-state Assur.

== Reign ==
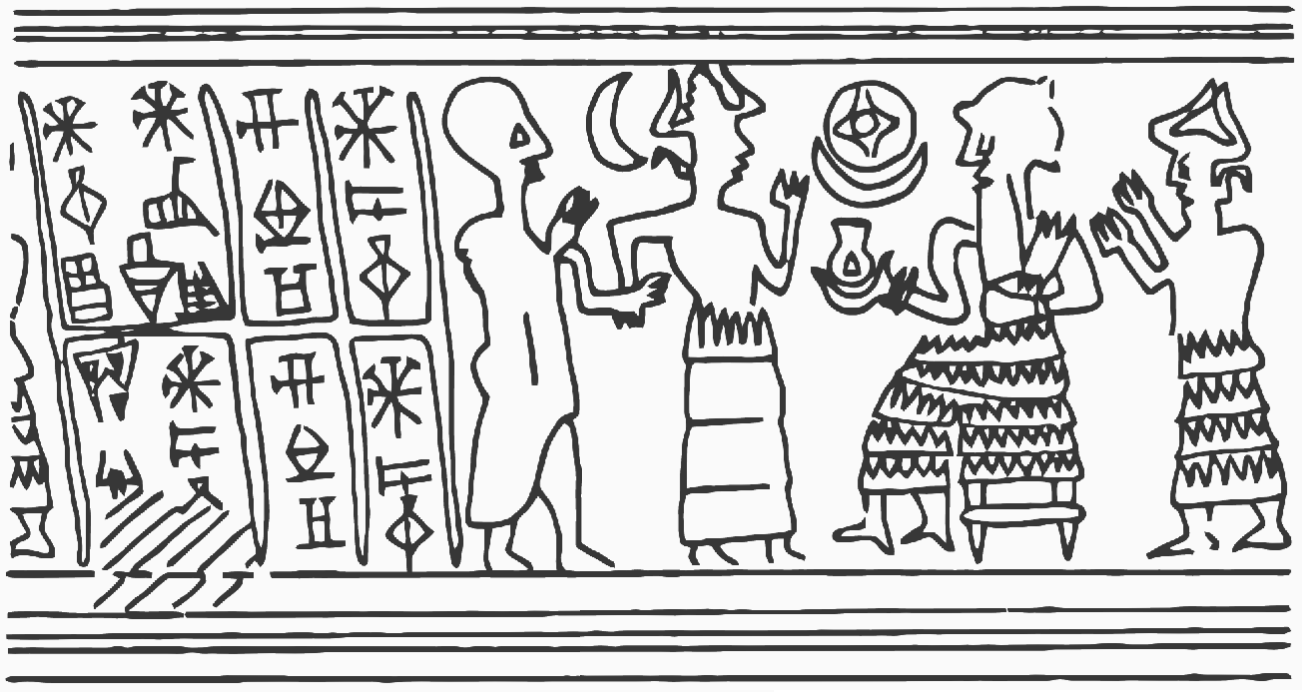
Line-drawing of a seal of Naram-Sin, from Kültepe. The seated figure is believed to be the god Ashur, with Naram-Sin being the figure furthest to the left being led towards him.

He is listed as the 37th king of Assyria on the later Assyrian King Lists, where he is inscribed ^{m}na-ram-^{d}EN.ZU, (Note: SDAS List, IM 60484, i 34.) (Note: Nassouhi List, Istanbul A. 116 (Assur 8836), i 33.) (Note: Khorsabad List, IM 60017 (excavation nos.: DS 828, DS 32-54), i 34.) or a fragmentary list where he appears as -^{d}30. (Note: Assyrian Kinglist fragment VAT 9812 = KAV 14: ‘3) He was named for the illustrious Naram-Sin of Akkad and took the divine determinative in his name (just like Naram-Sin's grandfather: Sargon I, who may have been named after Sargon of Akkad.) Naram-Sin should not be confused with the Naram-Sin who had ruled Eshnunna for around 12 years (the successor and son, as identified on an inscription, of the long-reigning Ebiq-Adad II.) It is probable that Naram-Sin of Assur was, however, contemporaneous with the earlier part of Ebiq-Adad II’s reign (whose last attestation was in the Mari Eponym Chronicle B line 25 some 56 years after Naram-Sin’s inauguration.) Naram-Sin of Assyria was the son and successor of the short-reigning Puzur-Ashur II, filiation preserved in his seal impression on the envelopes of the waklum-letters to his Anatolian-based treading colonies at the karum Kanesh and in the later Assyrian King Lists.

The length of Naram-Sin's reign is uncertain, however; based on various excavated "limmu" (eponym) lists, the reigns of Naram-Sin and his son and successor Erishum II had a combined length of 64 years. The Assyrian King List records that Shamshi-Adad I, “went away to Babylonia in the time of Naram-Sin.” Shamshi-Adad I did not return until he had taken Ekallatum, after which he paused for three years and then overthrew Erishum II. The Mari Eponym Chronicle, which resumes the listing until the seizure of Ekallatum by Shamshi-Adad I, provides no clue as to when the succession of Erishum II had taken place. As the reign of Erishum II was prematurely ended by the conquests of Shamshi-Adad I, it is likely that Naram-Sin's reign was the greater part of the period, additionally; the broken figure on the Nassouhi King List ends on four, so perhaps Naram-Sin reigned 44 or 54 years (c. 1872 BC onward, middle chronology). Despite this, there are no extant monumental inscriptions recording his activities.

=== Limmu year-names ===
The following is a list of the last 27 annually-elected limmu officials listed on the extant Kültepe Eponym Lists (KEL) representing Naram-Sin's first years (ending nearly a decade before Naram-Sin's 35th year during which the karum Kanesh was destroyed c. 1837 BC, the II layer.) The city-state of Assur which Naram-Sin had inherited would have been fairly wealthy as the hub of the trading network at the height of the Assur's activity and despite the destruction of the trading colony at Kanesh partway through his reign, commerce apparently continued elsewhere. A gap of up to four years is apparent between the end of the KEL and the beginning of the Mari Eponym Chronicle (MEC B.) There are no extant monumental inscriptions recording his activities. The dating on this list uses the middle chronology for the ancient Near East:

1872 BC Shu-Suen, son of Bab-ilum
1871 BC Ashur-malik, son of Alahum
1870 BC Ashur-imitti, son of Ili-bani
1869 BC Enna-Suen, son of Shu-Adhur
1868 BC Akkutum, son of Alahum
1867 BC Mas.i-ili, son of Irishum
1866 BC Iddi-ahum, son of Kudanum
1865 BC Samaya, son of Shu-Balum
1864 BC Ili-Anum, son of Sukkalia
1863 BC Ennam-Anum, son of Adhur-malik
1862 BC Ennum-Ashur, son of Duni-Ea
1861 BC Enna-Suen, son of Shu-Ishtar
1860 BC Hannanarum
1859 BC Dadia
1858 BC Kapatia
1857 BC Ishma-Ashur, son of Ea-dan
1856 BC Ashur-mutappil, son of Azizum
1855 BC Shu-Nirah, son of Azuzaya
1854 BC Iddin-abum
1853 BC Ili-dan, son of Azuza
1852 BC Ashur-imitti, son of Iddin-Ištar
1851 BC Buzia, son of Abia
1850 BC Dadia, son of Shu-Ilabrat
1849 BC Puzur-Ishtar, son of Nur-ilišu
1848 BC Isaya, son of Dagan-malkum
1847 BC Abu-Shalim, son of Ili-Anum
1846 BC Ashur-re'i, son of Ili-emuqi

== Inscriptions ==
Preceded by Puzur-Ashur II	King of Assyria c. 1873 – c. 1823 BC	Succeeded by Erishum II
