= Erishum II =

Assyrian king

King of Assyria
- Reign: c. 1823 – c. 1809 BC
- Predecessor: Naram-Sin
- Successor: Position abolished
- Died: c. 1809 BC
- Father: Naram-Sin

Erishum II or Erišum II (died c. 1809 BC) the son and successor of Naram-Sin, was the king of the city-state Assur from c. 1828/1818 BC to 1809 BC. Like his predecessors, he bore the titles Išši’ak Aššur (Steward of Assur) and ensí. The length of Erishum II's reign is uncertain, however; based on various excavated "limmu" (eponym) lists, Naram-Sin's and Erishum II's reigns had a combined length of 64 years.

== Reign and Shamshi adad ==
The Amorites had in the centuries prior overrun the kingdoms of Lower Mesopotamia and the Levant between, but had hitherto been repelled by the Assyrian kings. However, Erishum II was to be the last king of the dynasty of Puzur-Ashur I as he was deposed and the throne of Assyria was abolished by Shamshi-Adad I during the expansion of the Amorite tribes from the Khabur River, establishing Upper Mesopotamia. Although regarded as an Amorite by later Assyrian tradition, Shamshi-Adad I's descent is suggested to be from the same line as the legendary native Assyrian ruler Ushpia within the Assyrian King List, possibly added to the list in order to legitimize his rule. Shamshi-Adad I had inherited the throne in Terqa from his father Ila-kabkabu. The Assyrian King List records that Shamshi-Adad I, "went away to Babylonia in the time of Naram-Sin" while Naram-Sin of Eshnunna had been attacking Ekallatum. Shamshi-Adad I had not returned until he had taken Ekallatum, after which he had paused for three years and then had overthrown Erishum II. The Mari Eponym Chronicle, which resumes the listing until the seizure of Ekallatum by Shamshi-Adad I, provides no clue as to when the succession of Erishum II had taken place. As the reign of Erishum II was prematurely ended by the conquests of Shamshi-Adad I, it is likely that Naram-Sin's reign was the greater part of the period, additionally; the broken figure on the Nassouhi King List ends on four, so perhaps Naram-Sin reigned 44 or 54 years (c. 1872 BC onward, middle chronology.)

Preceded by Naram-Sin	King of Assyria c. 1823 – c. 1809 BC	Succeeded by Position abolished
