= Limmu =

Assyrian official after whom the current year was named

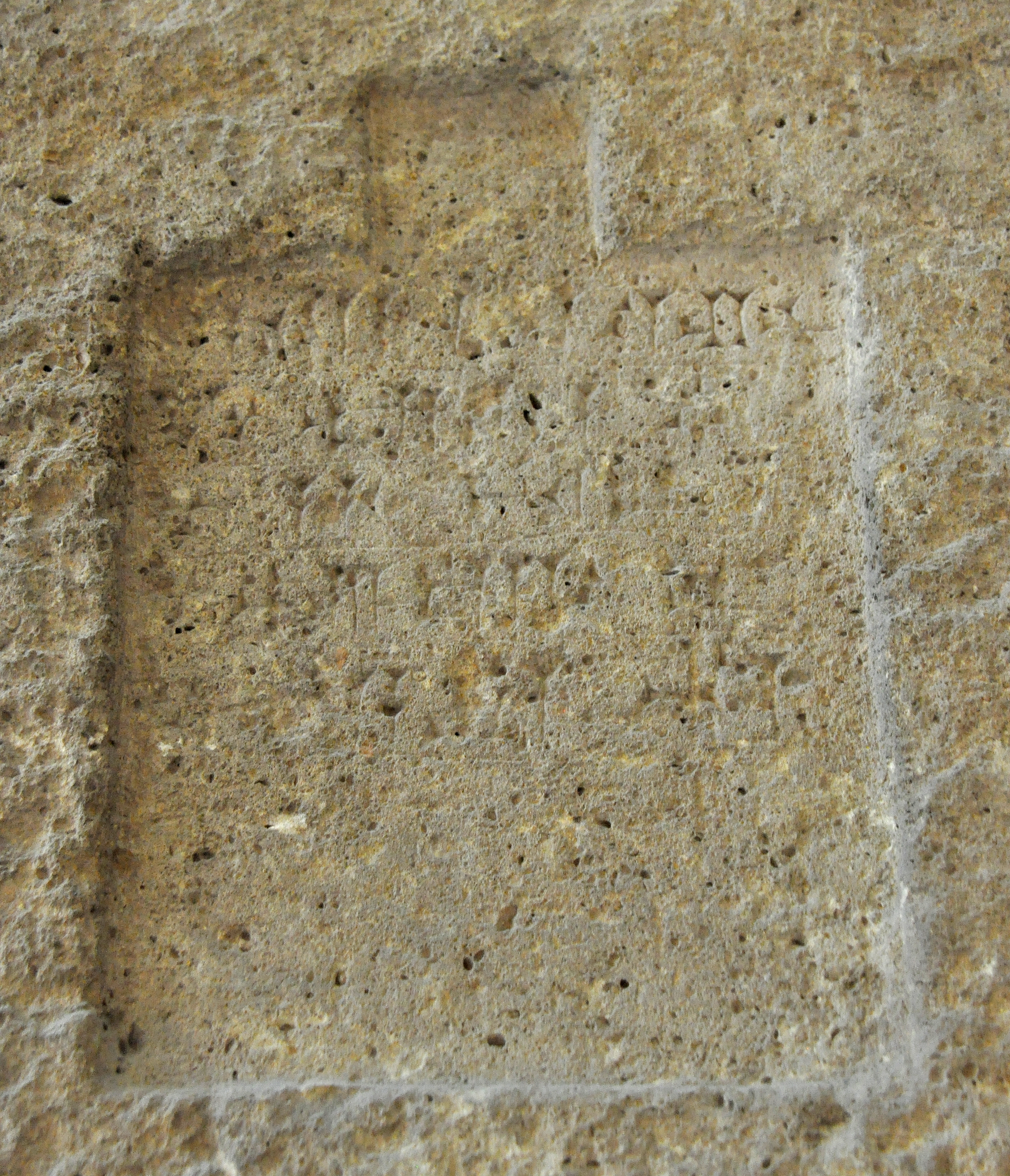
Detail. Stele of Shamsh-bel-usur, limmu of the years 864 and 851 BCE. From Assur, Iraq. Pergamon Museum

In the history of Assyria, Limmu was an Assyrian eponym (a person after whom something is named). At the beginning of the reign of an Assyrian king, the limmu, an appointed royal official, would preside over the New Year festival at the capital. Each year a new limmu would be chosen. Although picked by lot, there was most likely a limited group, such as the men of the most prominent families or perhaps members of the city assembly. The Assyrians used the name of the limmu for that year to designate the year on official documents. Lists of limmus have been found and reconstructed accounting for every year between 858 BC - 699 BC and 1964 BC - 1710 BC. The older list has been named Revised Eponym List (REL), after new clay tablets were discovered in Kültepe (ancient Kanesh) adding more names to the list.

During the Old Assyrian period, the king himself was never the limmum, as it was called in their language. In the Middle Assyrian and Neo-Assyrian periods, however, the king could take this office.

== Dating Methods ==
The chronology is based on the timeline of the destruction of the trading post at Kültepe, which was destroyed after REL 138 and REl 141, which was roughly contemporaneous with the construction of the nearby palace of King Waršama. This dating is corroborated by the solar eclipse recorded in REL 127, identified as the eclipse of 24 March 1838 BC.

== See also ==
- Eponym list
