= King of Sumer and Akkad =

Royal title in Ancient Mesopotamia

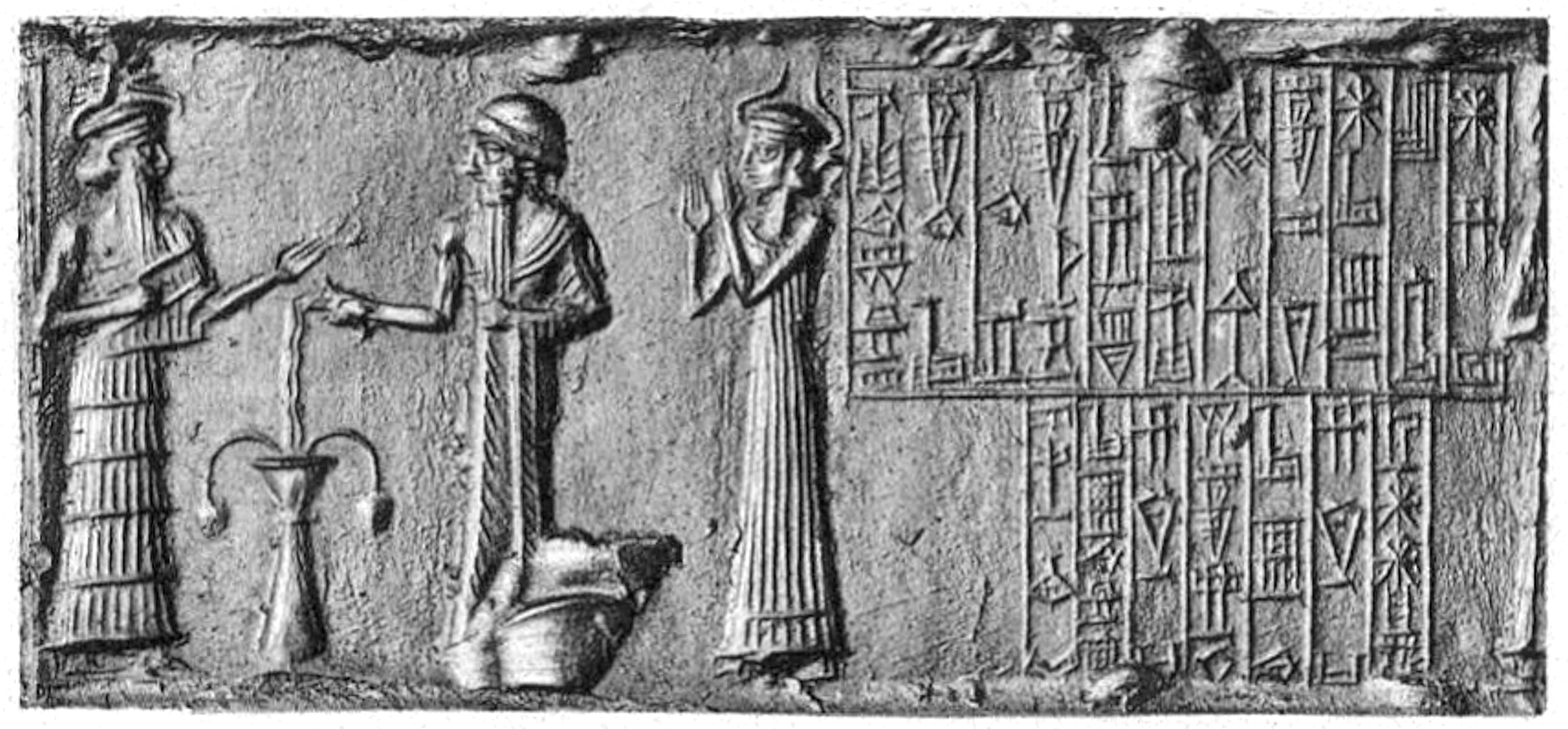
Cylindrical seal of Shulgi of Ur (r. c. 2094–2047 BC). The inscription reads "To Nuska, supreme minister of Enlil, his king, for the life of Shulgi, strong hero, King of Ur, King of Sumer and Akkad".

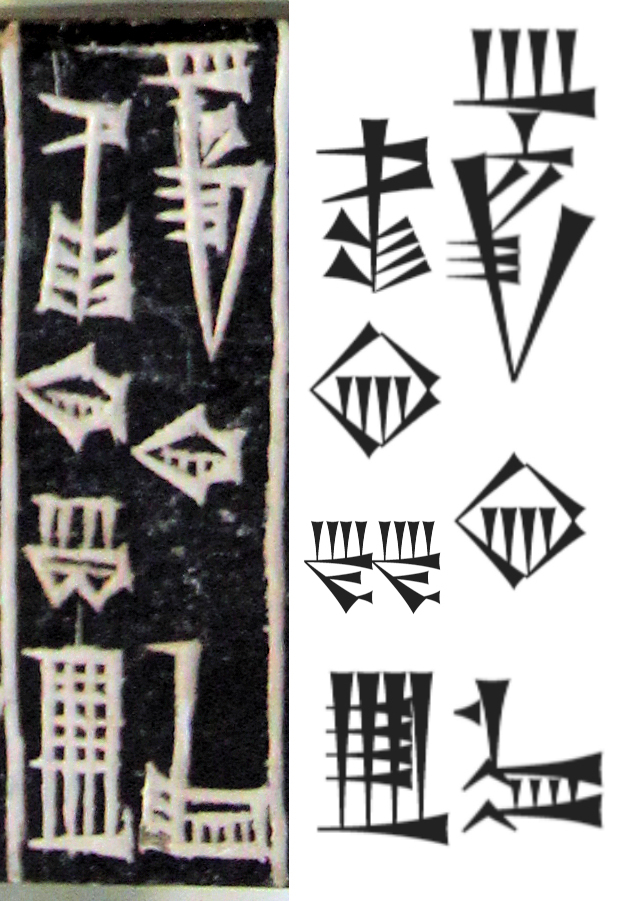
Cuneiform inscription Lugal Kiengi Kiuri 𒈗𒆠𒂗𒄀𒆠𒌵, "King of Sumer and Akkad", on a seal of Shulgi (r. c. 2094–2047 BC). The final ke_{4} 𒆤 is the composite of -k (genitive case) and -e (ergative case).

King of Sumer and Akkad (Sumerian: 𒈗𒆠𒂗𒄀𒆠𒌵 lugal-ki-en-gi-ki-uri, Akkadian: šar māt Šumeri u Akkadi) was a royal title in Ancient Mesopotamia combining the titles of "King of Akkad", the ruling title held by the monarchs of the Akkadian Empire (2334–2154 BC) with the title of "King of Sumer". The title simultaneously laid a claim on the legacy and glory of the ancient empire that had been founded by Sargon of Akkad (r. 2334–2279 BC) and expressed a claim to rule the entirety of lower Mesopotamia (composed of the regions of Sumer in the south and Akkad in the north). Despite both of the titles "King of Sumer" and "King of Akkad" having been used by the Akkadian kings, the title was not introduced in its combined form until the reign of the Neo-Sumerian king Ur-Nammu (c. 2112–2095 BC), who created it in an effort to unify the southern and northern parts of lower Mesopotamia under his rule. The older Akkadian kings themselves might have been against linking Sumer and Akkad in such a way.

In later centuries of Mesopotamian history, when the major kingdoms were Assyria and Babylon, the title was mostly used by monarchs of Babylon since they ruled lower Mesopotamia. For Assyrian kings, the title became a formal assertion of authority over the city of Babylon and its surroundings; only those Assyrian rulers who actually controlled Babylon used the title and when Assyria permanently lost control of Babylon to the Neo-Babylonian Empire, the rulers of that empire began using it instead. The final king to claim to be the King of Sumer and Akkad was Cyrus the Great (r. c. 559–530 BC) of the Achaemenid Empire, who assumed several traditional Mesopotamian titles after his conquest of Babylon in 539 BC.

== History ==
=== Background (2334–2112 BC) ===
The Akkadian Empire at its height under Naram-Sin (r. c. 2254–2218 BC).

In the 24th/23rd century BC, Sargon of Akkad established the earliest known great Mesopotamian empire, known as the Akkadian Empire after its capital Akkad. Though his empire stretched far and wide, one of its most important regions was Sumer, the southern parts of lower Mesopotamia, where city states had competed with each other for universal rule for centuries. As such, the royal titles used by Sargon and his Akkadian successors were King of Akkad (Akkadian: šar māt Akkadi) and King of Sumer (Akkadian: šar māt Šumeri). The Akkadian kings also introduced some additional honorary royal titles, including Sargon's "King of the Universe" (šar kiššatim) and Naram-Sin's (Sargon's grandson) "King of the Four Corners of the World" (šar kibrāt erbetti). The political union of Sumer and Akkad under the Akkadian Empire, the largest empire that the world had yet seen, was seen as a monumentous event even in contemporary times, with both Sargon and Naram-Sin soon becoming legendary figures who would frequently appear in later Mesopotamian discussions on history.

During the reign of Naram-Sin's son Shar-Kali-Sharri (r. c. 2217–2193 BC) the Akkadian Empire began to collapse as a result of widespread drought and an invasion by the nomadic Gutians.'In the 2100s BC, the Gutians destroyed the city of Akkad and supplanted the ruling Sargonic dynasty with their own line of kings of Sumer. The so-called Gutian dynasty did not last long, having been completely driven out by c. 2112 BC, replaced as the overall rulers of Sumer by the kings of Ur, which founded a new period of Sumerian civilization referred to as the Third Dynasty of Ur or the Neo-Sumerian Empire.

=== Creation of the title (2112–1717 BC) ===
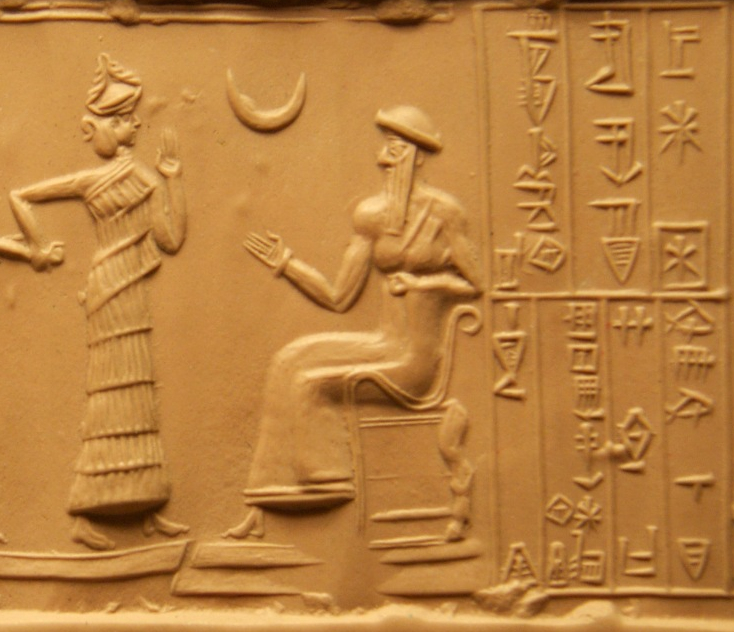
Depiction of an enthroned Ur-Nammu of Ur (r. c. 2112–2095 BC) from one of his cylindrical seals. Ur-Nammu introduced the title of King of Sumer and Akkad to assert his rule over the entirety of lower Mesopotamia.

The founder of the Third Dynasty of Ur, king Ur-Nammu (r. c. 2112–2095 BC) combined the old Akkadian royal titles "King of Akkad" and "King of Sumer" to create the combined title of "King of Sumer and Akkad" (Akkadian: šar māt Šumeri u Akkadi) in an effort to unify the southern and northern parts of lower Mesopotamia under his rule (in his time, "Akkad" would have been associated with the north rather than just the ruined city) and proclaim the reunification of Sumer and Akkad. Though both of the titles that formed the combined title had been used by the Akkadian kings, the double title was new. Some scholars suggest that Sargon of Akkad had during his reign explicitly been against linking Sumer and Akkad in such a fashion.

There was some precedence in Mesopotamia for double titles of this kind. In the late Early Dynastic III period, double titles were sometimes used to express control over all of Sumer, the titles usually include or allude to the cities of Uruk and Ur. At this time, special titles, such as the attested "Lord of Sumer and King of the nation", were usually unique to a single ruler and in most cases, the word "king" (or an equivalent) was repeated, such as in the attested "King of Uruk and King of Ur", used by kings Lugal-kinishe-dudu and Lugal-kisalsi (both c. 2400 BC). Before the creation of titles like King of Sumer, King of Sumer and Akkad and more boastful honoraries like King of the Four Corners of the World and King of the Universe, there were no titles designating a regional ruler and specifying him as more powerful than the ruler of just a city, most titles following the format of ""King of" + city name".

Ur-Nammu might rather have borrowed the idea of the combined title from the Hurrian king Atal-shen, who would have ruled in the land of Subartu in the decades immediately preceding Ur-Nammu's own reign. Atal-shen's title was "King of Urkis and Nawar", a title which combines the names of two cities distant from each other to claim rule over the entire land in between (e.g. Subartu). Ur-Nammu was acknowledged by the priesthood at Nippur, a religiously important city, with the title "King of Sumer and Akkad" and crowned as sovereign of the two lands surrounding Nippur "to right and left". Though the title is only well-attested for Ur-Nammu and his son Shulgi (r. c. 2094–2047 BC), it was the primary royal title of the Third Dynasty of Ur, alongside that of "King of Ur". The title continued to act as an important royal title throughout the rule of the succeeding Dynasty of Isin (c. 1953–1717 BC), many of its rulers using the title, after the collapse of the Third Dynasty of Ur. It is possible that its continued use was because of the northern Akkad region of Mesopotamia gaining some sort of socioeconomic advantage over the southern region of Sumer.

=== Babylonian and Assyrian kings (1728–539 BC) ===
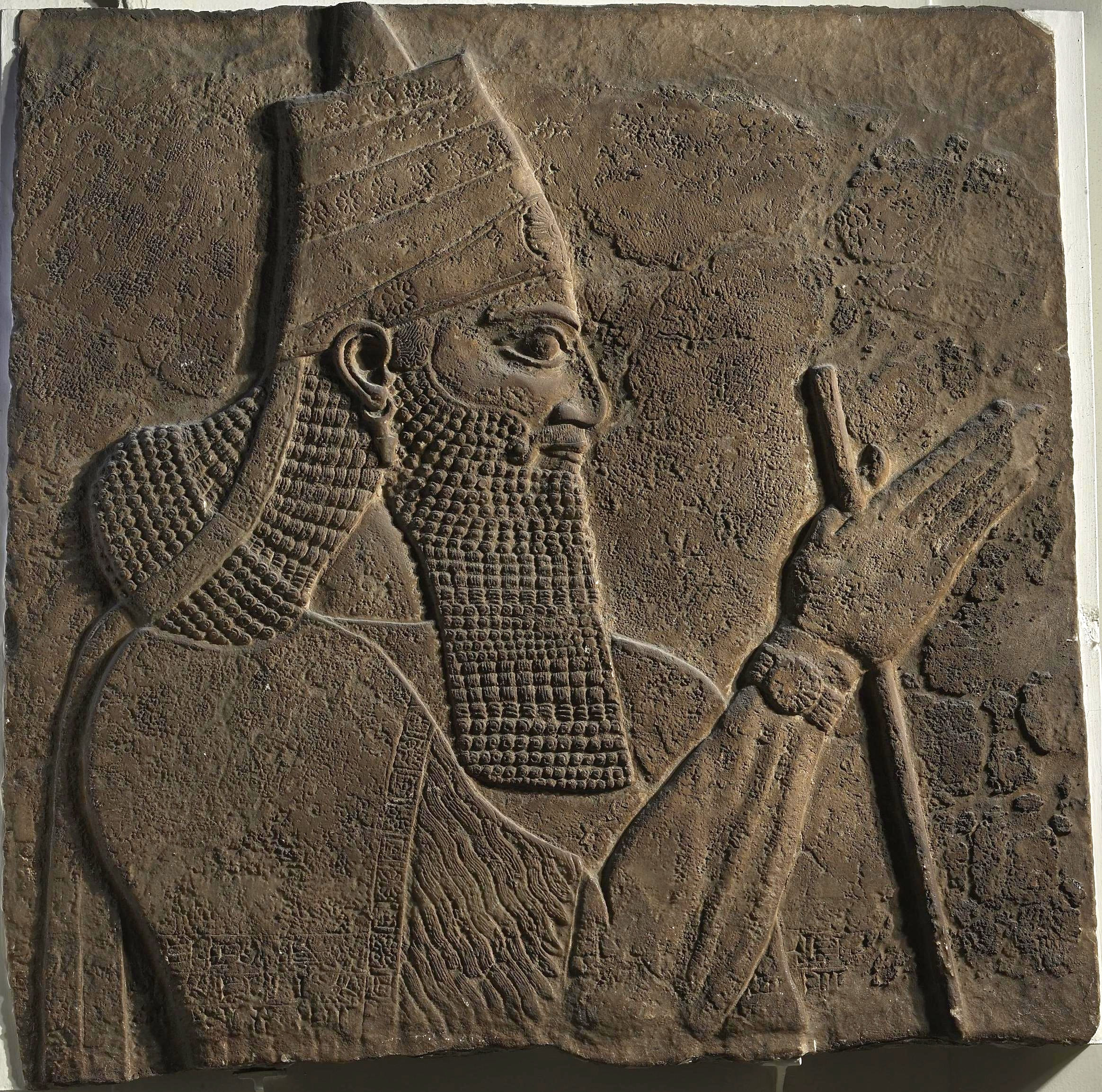
Tiglath-Pileser III (r. c. 745–727 BC) on a stela from the walls of his palace (now in the British Museum, London). Tiglath-Pileser was the first Assyrian king in centuries (except for a claim by Shamshi-Adad V) to use the title of King of Sumer and Akkad following his conquest of Babylon.

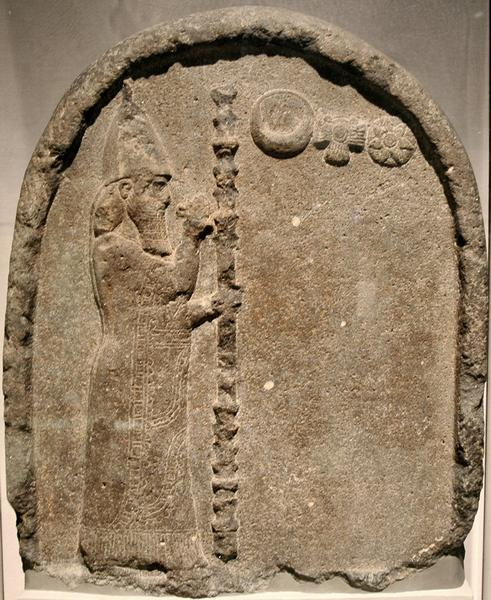
Nabonidus of Babylon (r. c. 556–539 BC) shown praying to the moon, sun and Venus (British Museum). Nabonidus was one of the last rulers to use the title King of Sumer and Akkad.

After the collapse of the Dynasty of Isin, the king Rim-Sin of Larsa (r. c. 1758–1699 BC) claimed its legacy but he was soon defeated by Hammurabi of Babylon (r. c. 1728–1686 BC) who conquered the considerable kingdom that Rim-Sin ruled (which included prominent cities like Uruk and the previous capital Isin). Through either outright conquest or forcing other states to pay tribute, Hammurabi extended Babylonian rule throughout Mesopotamia and while his early reign may be characterizable as a dual monarchy of sorts, ruling both Sumer and Akkad as more or less separate entities, his conquests to the northeast and north saw the formation of a true empire, which would not stay intact under his successors. As part in the formation of his empire, Hammurabi took the traditional ruling title of King of Sumer and Akkad, which after his reign appears sporadically in the titularies of Babylonian kings up until the eighth-century BC.

Apart from the Babylonian kings, those Assyrian rulers who succeeding in conquering and controlling Babylon and Sumer also used the title of King of Sumer and Akkad. The earliest Assyrian king to succeed in this was the Middle Assyrian Tukulti-Ninurta I (r. c. 1244–1208 BC). After his reign, Babylon swiftly regained independence and as such the title would not be used by an Assyrian ruler for five hundred years (except for being claimed by Shamshi-Adad V, c. 824–811 BC, who did not actually control Babylon) until Babylon was reconquered under Tiglath-Pileser III (r. c. 745–727 BC). After Tiglath-Pileser III's reign, Babylon rebelled again and his son Sargon II (r. c. 722–705 BC) was also forced to reconquer it once more, only using the title upon his victory. For unknown reasons Sargon II's heir Sennacherib discarded the title but it was in turn reintroduced by Sennacherib's heir Esarhaddon.

In the light of the Neo-Assyrian Empire's southern conquests, southern titles and epithets, including King of Sumer and Akkad, would have been important in order to assert control. The title allowed the Assyrian king to align himself with both the Akkadian and the Sumerian cultures. With "Sumer" referring to the coastal regions of southern Mesopotamia and Akkad the northern parts of the south, the title claimed control over all of lower Mesopotamia. To the Assyrians, the title was not only a claim to the prestige and legacy of Sargon of Akkad and the Akkadian Empire but also a formal assertion of sovereignty over Babylon. After the Neo-Assyrian Empire lost control over Babylon for good with the founding of the Neo-Babylonian Empire, the Assyrian kings ceased to use the title. "King of Sumer and Akkad" was instead adopted by the first Neo-Babylonian king, Nabopolassar (r. c. 626–605 BC) The title continued to be used by the monarchs of the Neo-Babylonian Empire until its fall.

=== Cyrus the Great (539 BC) ===
In 539 BC, Cyrus the Great, founder of the Achaemenid Empire, conquered the city of Babylon and formally ended the Neo-Babylonian Empire. As part of his conquest, Cyrus created a foundation deposit to be buried in the walls of Babylon, now known as the Cyrus Cylinder, with text written in Akkadian cuneiform script. In the text of the cylinder, Cyrus assumes several traditional Mesopotamian titles including those of "King of Babylon", "King of Sumer and Akkad" and "King of the Four Corners of the World".

Most of the Mesopotamian titles adopted by Cyrus, except for the one of "King of Babylon", were not used beyond his own reign, but other similar Mesopotamian titles continued to be adopted. The popular regnal title "King of Kings" (rendered šar šarrāni in Akkadian), used by monarchs of Iran until the modern age, was originally a title introduced by the Assyrian Tukulti-Ninurta I in the 13th century BC, the same Assyrian king that had first conquered Babylon. The title of "King of Lands", also used by Assyrian monarchs since at least Shalmaneser III (r. c. 859–824 BC), was also adopted by Cyrus the Great and his successors.

== List of kings of Sumer and Akkad ==
Kings of Sumer and Akkad in the Third Dynasty of Ur:

Introduced by Ur-Nammu, the title of Sumer and Akkad was an important royal title during the Third Dynasty of Ur.

- Ur-Nammu (r. c. 2112–2095 BC)
- Shulgi (r. c. 2094–2047 BC)
- Amar-Sin (r. c. 2046–2038 BC)
- Shu-Sin (r. c. 2037–2029 BC)
- Ibbi-Sin (r. c. 2028–2004 BC)

Kings of Sumer and Akkad in the Dynasty of Isin:

King of Sumer and Akkad continued to be the primary royal title claiming kingship over Mesopotamia in the Dynasty of Isin.

- Ishbi-Erra (r. c. 1953–1920 BC)
- Shu-Ilishu (r. c. 1920–1900 BC)
- Iddin-Dagan (r. c. 1900–1879 BC)
- Ishme-Dagan (r. c. 1879–1859 BC)
- Lipit-Eshtar (r. c. 1859–1848 BC)
- Ur-Ninurta (r. c. 1848–1820 BC)
- Bur-Suen (r. c. 1820–1799 BC)
- Lipit-Enlil (r. c. 1799–1794 BC)
- Erra-imitti (r. c. 1794–1786 BC)
- Enlil-bani (r. c. 1786–1762 BC)
- Zambiya (r. c. 1762–1759 BC)
- Iter-pisha (r. c. 1759–1755 BC)
- Ur-du-kuga (r. c. 1755–1751 BC)
- Suen-magir (r. c. 1751–1740 BC)
- Damiq-ilishu (r. c. 1740–1717 BC)

Kings of Sumer and Akkad in Larsa:

- Sin-Iddinam (r. c. 1785–1778 BC)
- Rim-Sin (r. c. 1758–1699 BC)

Kings of Sumer and Akkad in Babylon:

Claimed by Hammurabi after his conquest of Mesopotamia, the title was sporadically used by Babylonian kings up until the 700s BC. Some kings who used the title include;

- Hammurabi (r. c. 1728–1686 BC)
- Karaindash (c. 1410 BC)

Kings of Sumer and Akkad in the Middle Assyrian Empire:

Tukulti-Ninurta I was the only Middle Assyrian king to hold Babylon and as such the only to assume the title.

- Tukulti-Ninurta I (r. c. 1244–1208 BC)

Kings of Sumer and Akkad in the Neo-Assyrian Empire:

With the exception of Shamshi-Adad V, the title was only used by Neo-Assyrian rulers who actually controlled Babylon.

- Shamshi-Adad V (r. 824–811 BC)
- Tiglath-Pileser III (r. 745–727 BC)
- Shalmaneser V (r. 727–722 BC)
- Sargon II (r. 722–705 BC)
- Esarhaddon (r. 681–669 BC)
- Ashurbanipal (r. 669–631 BC)
- Shamash-shum-ukin (Neo-Assyrian king of Babylon, r. 668–648 BC)

Kings of Sumer and Akkad in the Neo-Babylonian Empire:

After regaining independence, the rulers of Babylon continued to use the title.

- Nabopolassar (r. 626–605 BC)
- Nebuchadnezzar II (r. 605–562 BC)
- Amel-Marduk (r. 562–560 BC)
- Neriglissar (r. 560–556 BC)
- Labashi-Marduk (r. 556 BC)
- Nabonidus (r. 556–539 BC)

Kings of Sumer and Akkad in the Achaemenid Empire:

- Cyrus the Great (r. 559–530 BC), claimed the title from 539 BC.
