= Ikūn-pî-Ištar =

Ikūn-pî-Ištar, meaning “Ištar's word has come true” and inscribed [i-k]u-un-pi_{4}-eš_{4}-tár, (fl. c. 1875 BC) was a Mesopotamian king of uncertain jurisdiction. Thorkild Jacobsen suggested Uruk, presumably preceding Sîn-kāšid, contemporary with the latter part of the 1st Dynasty of Isin.

== History ==
He appears on two variant Sumerian King List fragments, one of which has him followed by Sumu-abum of Babylon, the other sandwiched between the reigns of Erra-imitti and Enlil-bani, the kings of Isin. This gives his reign as six months or a year depending on which variant is cited.

Sumuel, the king of Larsa’s fifth year name (c. 1825 BC) celebrates a victory over the forces of Uruk during a time when it was independent. A haematite cylinder (Note: Cylinder seal BM 121209.) seal in the British Museum attests to a servant of pî-Ištar, which may be an abbreviation of this king’s name. A satukku (sá-dug_{4}), or offering, text from Nippur is the only exemplar of a text giving his year name and was found among a cache of cuneiform tablets relating to the temple of Ninurta dating from Lipit-Enlil’s first year (ca. 1798 BC) onward, after which the city remained under the control of the kings of Isin for a seventy five year period. His hegemony over this city must therefore have preceded that of Lipit-Enlil.
