= Ur-Ninurta =

King of Isin
- Reign: c. 1924 - c. 1896 BC
- Predecessor: Lipit-Ishtar
- Successor: Bur-Suen
- Died: c. 1896 BC
- Issue: Bur-Suen
- Dynasty: First Dynasty of Isin

Ur-Ninurta (died c. 1896 BC) was the 6th king of the 1st Dynasty of Isin. A usurper, Ur-Ninurta seized the throne on the fall of Lipit-Ishtar and held it until his violent death some 28 years later.

== Biography ==
He called himself “son of Iškur,” the southern storm-god synonymous with Adad, in his adab to Iškur. (Note: VAT 8212.) His name was wholly Sumerian, in marked contrast to the Amorite names of his five predecessors. There are only two extant inscriptions, one of which is stamped on bricks in 13 lines of Sumerian from the cities of Nippur, Isin, Uruk, and Išān Ḥāfudh, a small site southeast of Tell Drehem, which gives his standard inscription (Note: Extant on numerous bricks, for example BM 90378.) describing him as an “Išippum priest with clean hands for Eridu, favorite en priest of Uruk” and there is a copy of an inscription relating to the erection of a statue of the king with a votive goat. (Note: CBS 12694.)

He was contemporary with Gungunum, and his successor Abisare, c. 1905 BC to c. 1894 BC, the resurgent kings of Larsa. His reign marks the beginning of a decline in Isin's fortunes coinciding with a rise in those of Larsa. Gungunum had wrestled Ur from Isin's control by his 10th year and it is possible this was the cause of Lipit-Ishtar's overthrow. Indeed, Ur-Ninurta made a dedicatory gift to the temple of Ningal in Ur during the 9th year of Gungunum. However, Ur-Ninurta continued to mention Ur in his titles ("herdsman of Ur") as did his successors in Isin. Gungunum went on to expand his kingdom, perhaps taking Nippur late in his reign. His death allowed Ur-Ninurta to launch a temporary counter-offensive, recapturing Nippur and several other cities on the Kishkattum canal. His year-name “year (Ur-Ninurta) set for Enlil free (of forced labor) for ever the citizens of Nippur and released (the arrears of) the taxes which they were bearing on their necks” may mark this point. His offensive was stopped at Adab, modern Bismaya, where Abī-sarē “defeated the army of Isin with his weapon,” in the 9th year-name of his reign. It may be that this battle was where he was killed, as a year A of Halium of the kingdom of Mananâ, (Note: mu ur-^{d}nin-urta ba-gaz.) reads “the year Ur-Ninurta was slain” and Manabalte’el of Kisurra’s year G, (Note: mu ur-^{d}nin-urta ba-ugà.) “the year Ur-Ninurta was killed.”

No Mesopotamian monarch milked the pastoral metaphor more thoroughly than Ur-Ninurta, 'the shepherd who offers everything for Nippur,” a likely sign of problems establishing legitimacy:

Under his rule may the people rest in grassy pastures with him as their herdsman[.] May Ur-Ninurta make the numerous people follow the just path ... As for sheep, may he search for food (for them) to eat, may he let them have water to drink! … (Ur-Ninurta) the faithful shepherd who is attentive to you. May you be available to make the black-headed, numerous as sheep, follow your path…”

— Ur-Ninurta royal praise poetry, D 33f, A 20, 26, C 20–23.

There is a year name (Note: mu ús.sa ^{d}Ur-^{d}Nin.urta lugal.e a.gàr gal.gal a.ta im.ta.an.e_{11} mu.ús.sa.bi.) “year following the year that king Ur-Ninurta made emerge large a.gàrs from the water.” Marten Stol suggests that it indicates he succeeded in converting swamp or similar into cultivatable land.

A curious legal case came to his attention which he ordered be heard by the Assembly of Nippur. Lu-Inanna, a nišakku priest was murdered by Nanna-sig, Ku-Enlilla (a barber) and Enlil-ennam (an orchard-keeper) who then confessed to his estranged wife, Nin-dada, who remained suspiciously silent on the matter. Nine persons, with occupations ranging from bird-catcher to potter, presented the prosecution's case. Two others sprang to the defense of the widow, as she had not actually participated in the murder, but the assembly concluded she must have been “involved” with one of the murderers and consequently in cahoots with them. All four were condemned to execution in front of the victim's chair.

The Instructions of Ur-Ninurta and Counsels of Wisdom is a Sumerian courtly composition which extols the virtues of the king, the reestablisher of order, justice and cultic practices after the flood in emulation of the older role models Gilgamesh and Ziusudra. The Sumerian King List (Note: Sumerian King List extant in 16 copies.) gives his reign for 28 years. He was succeeded by his son, Bur-Suen.

== See also ==
- Sumer
- History of Sumer
- List of Mesopotamian dynasties
- Chronology of the ancient Near East
