= Bur-Suen =

Bur-Suen 𒀭𒁓𒀭𒂗𒍪
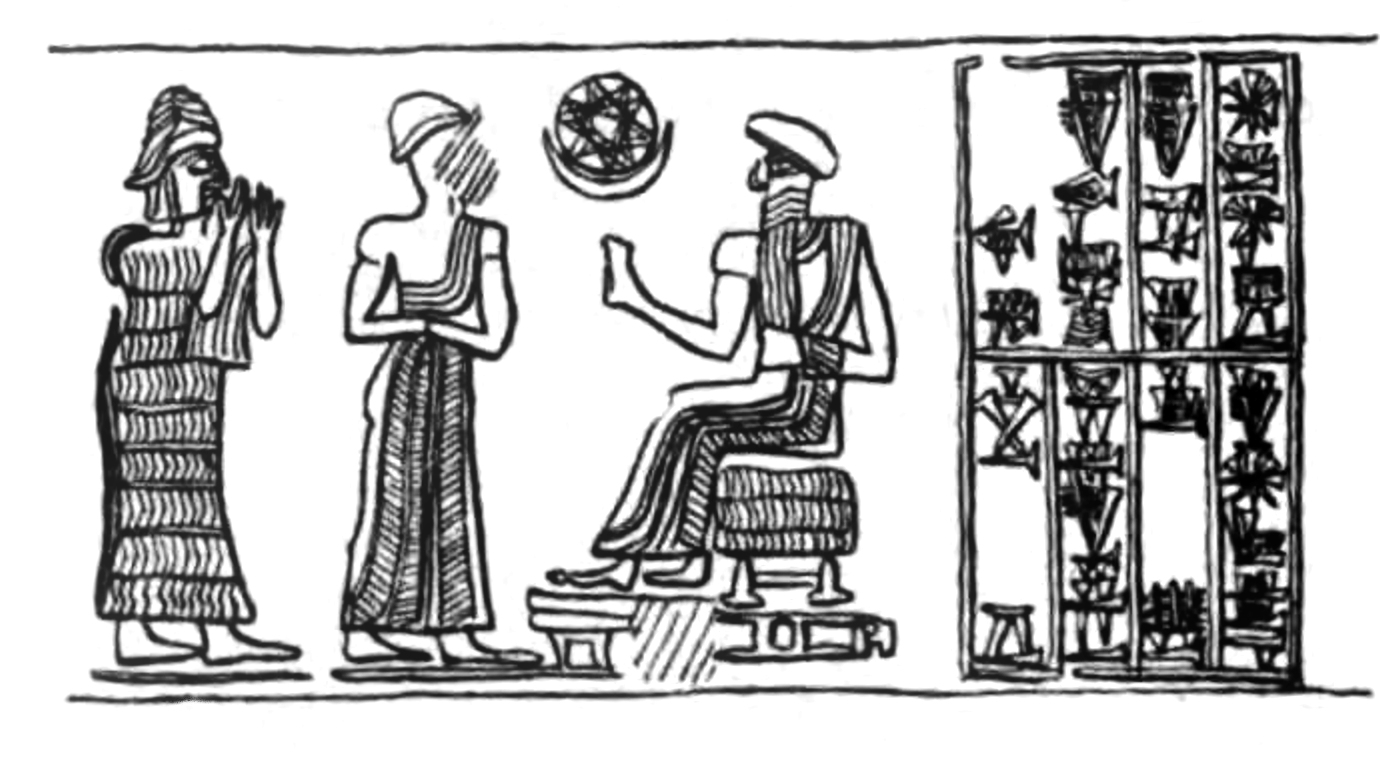
- Cylinder seal of Bur-Sin

King of Isin
- Reign: c. 1896 - c. 1874 BC
- Predecessor: Ur-Ninurta
- Successor: Lipit-Enlil
- Died: c. 1874 BC
- Issue: Lipit-Enlil
- Dynasty: First Dynasty of Isin
- Father: Ur-Ninurta

Būr-Sîn (inscribed 𒀭𒁓𒀭𒂗𒍪 ^{d}bur-^{d}EN.ZU; died c. 1874 BC), was the 7th king of the 1st Dynasty of Isin and ruled for 21 years according to the Sumerian King List, (Note: Sumerian King List, WS 444, the Weld Blundell prism.) 22 years according to the Ur-Isin king list. (Note: Ur-Isin king list MS 1686.) His reign was characterized by an ebb and flow in hegemony over the religious centers of Nippur and Ur.

== Biography ==
The titles “shepherd who makes Nippur content,” "mighty farmer of Ur," “who restores the designs for Eridu” and “en priest for the mes, for Uruk” were used by Būr-Sîn in his standard brick inscriptions in Nippur and Isin, (Note: For example, brick CBS 8642 from Nippur and brick IM 76546 from Isin.) although it seems unlikely that his rule stretched to Ur or Eridu at this time as the only inscriptions with an archaeological provenance come from the two northerly cities. A solitary tablet from Ur is dated to his first year, but this is thought to correspond to Abē-sarē’s year 11, for which several tablets attest to his reign over Ur.

He was contemporary with the tail end of the reign of Abisare, and that of Sumuel, the kings of Larsa. This latter king’s year-names record victories over Akusum, Kazallu, Uruk (which had seceded from Isin), Lugal-Sîn, Ka-ida, Sabum, Kish, and village of Nanna-isa, relentlessly edging north and feverish activity digging canals or filling them in, possibly to counter the measures taken by Būr-Sîn to contain him. Only nine of Būr-Sîn's own year-names are known and the sequence is uncertain. He seized control of Kisurra for a time as two year-names are found among tablets from this city, possibly following the departure of Sumu-abum the king of Babylon who “returned to his city.” The occupation was brief, however, as Sumu-El was to conquer it during his fourth year. Other year-names record Būr-Sîn's construction of fortifications, walls on the bank of the Eurphrates River and a canal. A year-name of Sumu-El records “Year after the year Sumu-El has opened the palace (?) of Nippur,” whose place in this king’s sequence is unknown.

A red-brown agate statuette was dedicated to goddess Inanna (Note: Formerly in collection of Frau G. Strauss.) and an agate plate (Note: LB 2120 in the Lagre Böhl collection.) was dedicated by the lukur priestess and his “traveling companion,” i.e. concubine, Nanāia Ibsa. A certain individual by the name of Enlil-ennam dedicated a dog figurine to the goddess Ninisina for the life of the king. There are around five extant seals and seal impressions of his servants and scribes, three of which were excavated in Ur suggesting a fleeting late reoccupancy of this city at the end of his reign and the beginning of his successor's as coincidentally no texts from Ur bear Sumu-El's years 19 to 22 which correspond with this period.

== See also ==
- Chronology of the ancient Near East
- List of Mesopotamian dynasties
