= Kisurra =

Archaeological site in Iraq

- Abū Ḥaṭab
- Location within Iraq
- 31°50′17″N 45°28′50″E
- Type: settlement
- Location: Al-Qādisiyyah Governorate, Iraq

Site notes
- Excavation dates: 1902-1903
- Archaeologists: Robert Koldewey
- Condition: Ruined
- Owner: Public
- Public access: Yes

Kisurra (modern Abū-Ḥaṭab, Al-Qādisiyyah Governorate, Iraq) was an ancient Near East city situated on the west bank of the Euphrates, 7 kilometres (4.3 mi) north of ancient Shuruppak and due east of ancient Kish. For most of its history it was subsidiary to the major nearby power centers of Uruk, Isin, and Larsa. The deities Inanna of Zabalam, Ningishzida, Ningal, Ninisina, and Annunitum were all worshiped at Kisurra, reflecting this influence. An obscure god Gal-ga-eri is mentioned in a tablet as coming from Kisurra. The ancient name of the site was determined in 1902 based on an inscribed brick translation by Friedrich Delitzsch. The brick read "Itur-Samas, chief of the Rabbeans, son of Iddin-Ilum, governor of Kisurra beloved of the god Samas and the goddess Annunitum".

== History ==
Several rulers of Kisurra (almost always as governors for greater powers) are known from year names with their order being conjectural:

- Itur-Šamaš (14 known year names) - built the temples of Annunitum, Enki, and Adad. Only known royal inscription.
- Manna-balti-El (10 YN) - built the temple of Ninurta and was a contemporary of Ur-Ninurta of Isin
- Šarrasyurrum (1 YN)
- Ubaya (4 YN)
- Zikrû (6 YN)
- Ibbi-Šamaš (1 YN)
- Sallum (2 YN) - built the city wall of Kakkulatum, a town known to be on the Tigris river near the mouth of the Diyalla river. Two tablets found at Kisurra had year names mentioning the death of Sallum.
- Ibni-šadûm (7 YN) - His wife was the daughter of Larsa ruler Sūmû-Ēl (c. 1895-1866 BC).

Another source states that Manna-balti-El, father of Ibni-šadûm married a daughter of Sūmû-Ēl based on an inscription reading "Šat-Sin, daughter of Sumu-El, daughter-in-law of Manna-balti-El, the wife of Ibni-šadum."

=== Early Bronze ===
Kisurra was established ca. 2700 BC, during the Sumerian Early Dynastic II period (17 ha). The southern end of the Isinnitum Canal was joined back into the Euphrates at Kisurra. The city lasted as a center for commerce and transport through the Akkadian, Ur III (46 ha).

=== Middle Bronze ===
The Larsa ruler Rim-Sin (c.1822 to 1763 BC) reports capturing Kisurra in his 20th year of reign. Cuneiform texts and excavation show a decline during the time of the Babylonian ruler Hammurabi (c.1792-1750 BC). Texts show that prisoners of war from Kisurra were held at Old Babylonian period Uruk. The Samsu-iluna (c. 1749-1712 BC), successor to Hammurabi, reports destroying Kisurra in his 13th year "Year in which Samsu-iluna the king by the command of Enlil brought Kisurra and Sabum to praise". Kisurra had joined the failed widespread revolt against the rule of Babylon, led by Rim-Sîn II of Larsa and including 26 cities, among them Uruk, Ur, and Isin as well as three "Elamite" governors (Tanene, Werriri, Kalumatum), against the First Dynasty of Babylon, at that time ruled by Samsu-iluna. Kisurra is mentioned in the Edict of king Ammi-Saduqa (c. 1638–1618 BC) "If a debt is incurred by a son (= citizen) of Numhia, Emutbal, Idamaraz, Uruk, Isin, Kisurra, or Murgu and he [gives] hims[elf], his wife or [his children] in sale, in penal servitude ...".

== Archaeology ==
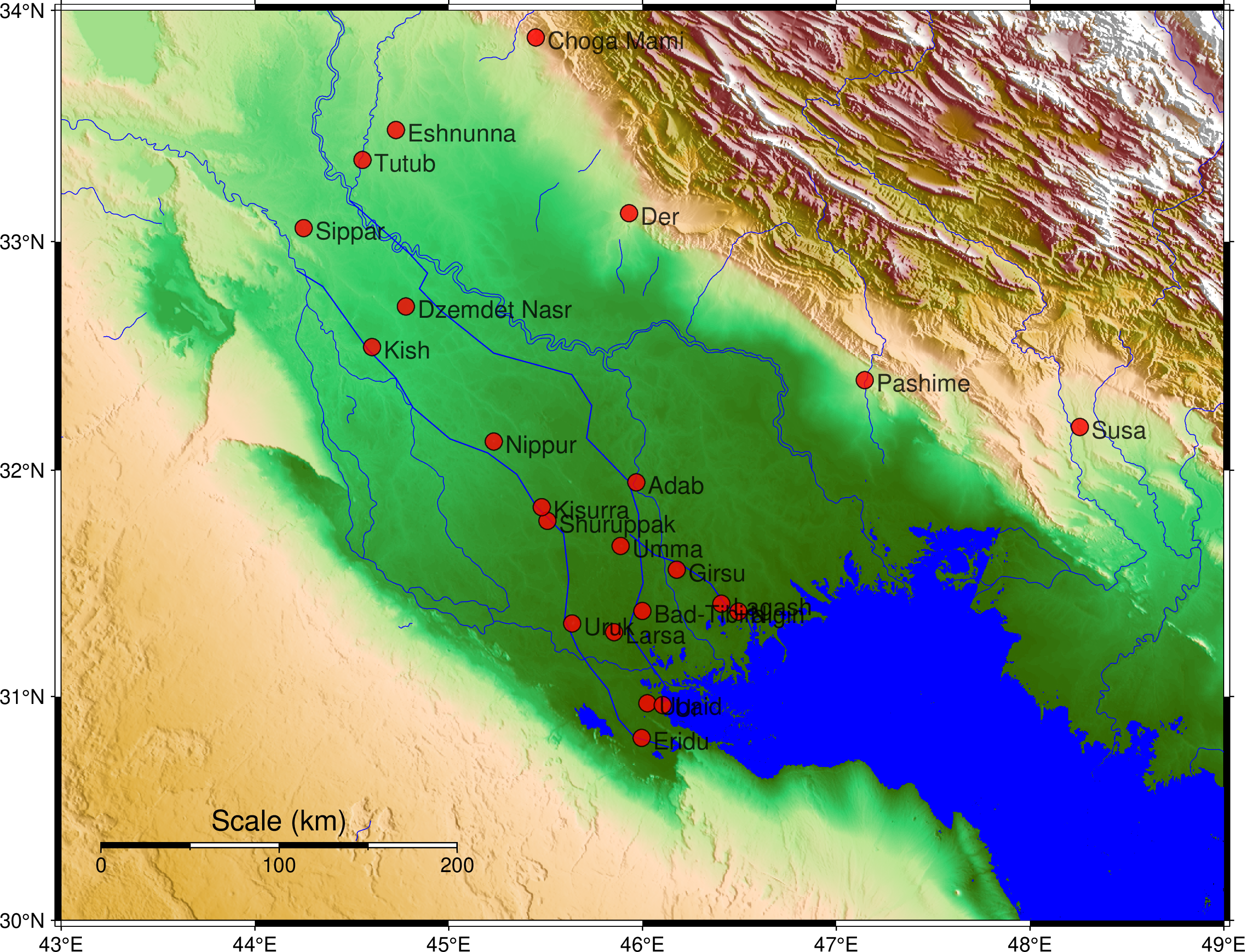
Some Sumerian cities and towns

The site has an area of about 46 hectares which is primarily Ur III and a northern extension of about 17 hectares which is primarily Early Dynastic II-III. The south end of the mound is covered by a modern cemetery. After a test excavation at the site by Hermann Volrath Hilprecht in 1901 German archaeologist Robert Koldewey with the Deutsche Orient-Gesellschaft excavated at the site in 1902-1903 for 33 days, finding many cuneiform tablets from Abū Ḥaṭab. Most of the tablets are held at the Istanbul Museum and Vorderasiatisches Museum in Berlin. Finds included (findspots unknown) an Old Akkadian period cylinder seal and five Old Babylonian period cylinder seals. A north-south trench was cut through the southern portion of the eastern edge of the mound and an east-west trench was dug at the north portion of the mound. A number of inscribed bricks of Bur-Sin (possibly the ruler of Isin) were found "^{d}Bur-Sin lugal Ur-(ki)-ma, Bur-Sin, in Nippur appointed by Bel of the Bel temple, the brave hero, King of Ur, King of the world divisions". In 2016 the QADIS survey project, carried out an aerial and surface survey of the site (QD075a). The surface remains of Abū Ḥaṭab were Early Dynastic I-II and those of the Abū Ḥaṭab main mound were Ur III. To date 260 cuneiform tablets from Kisurra have been published, mostly administrative (primarily loans, deeds, and deliveries) in nature but including one letter. The letter included the notable oath text

"Thus you (have said to me): 'Let your envoy grasp my testicles and my penis, and then I will give (it) to you.' Concerning(?) then what you have said to me, (I am dispatching to you) Burriya the son of Menanum."

The earliest tablets date to the reign of Larsa ruler Gungunum (c. 1932-1906 BC). The latest tablet is dated to the reign of Larsa ruler Rim-Sîn I (c. 1822-1763 BC).

== List of rulers ==
The following list should not be considered complete:

Portrait or inscription	Ruler	Approx. date and length of reign (Middle Chronology)	Comments, notes, and references for mentions
Isin-Larsa period (c. 2025 – c. 1763 BC)
	Itur-Šamaš	Uncertain; this ruler may have fl. c. 1923 – c. 1896 BC	Son of Idinilu; Held the title of, "King"; temp. of Ur-Ninurta
	Bur-Suen 𒀭𒁓𒀭𒂗𒍪	reigned c. 1895 – c. 1874 BC (21 years)	Son of Ur-Ninurta; Originally from Isin; Said on the Sumerian King List (SKL) to have held the title of, "King" of not just Isin; but, to have held the "Kingship" over all of Sumer; temp. of Sumuel
	Erra-imitti 𒀭𒀴𒊏𒄿𒈪𒋾	r. c. 1868 – c. 1861 BC (7 years)	Originally from Isin; Said on the SKL to have held the title of, "King" of not just Isin; but, to have held the "Kingship" over all of Sumer; temp. of Nur-Adad
	Manabaltiel	Uncertain	Held the title of, "King"
	Szarrasyurrum	Uncertain	Held the title of, "King"
	Zikrû	Uncertain	Held the title of, "King"
	Ubaya	Uncertain	Held the title of, "King"
	Ṣallum	Uncertain	Held the title of, "King"
	Ibni-šadûm	Uncertain	Held the title of, "King"
	Ibbi-Szamasz	Uncertain	Held the title of, "King"

== See also ==
- Cities of the Ancient Near East
- List of Mesopotamian dynasties
