= Lipit-Ishtar =

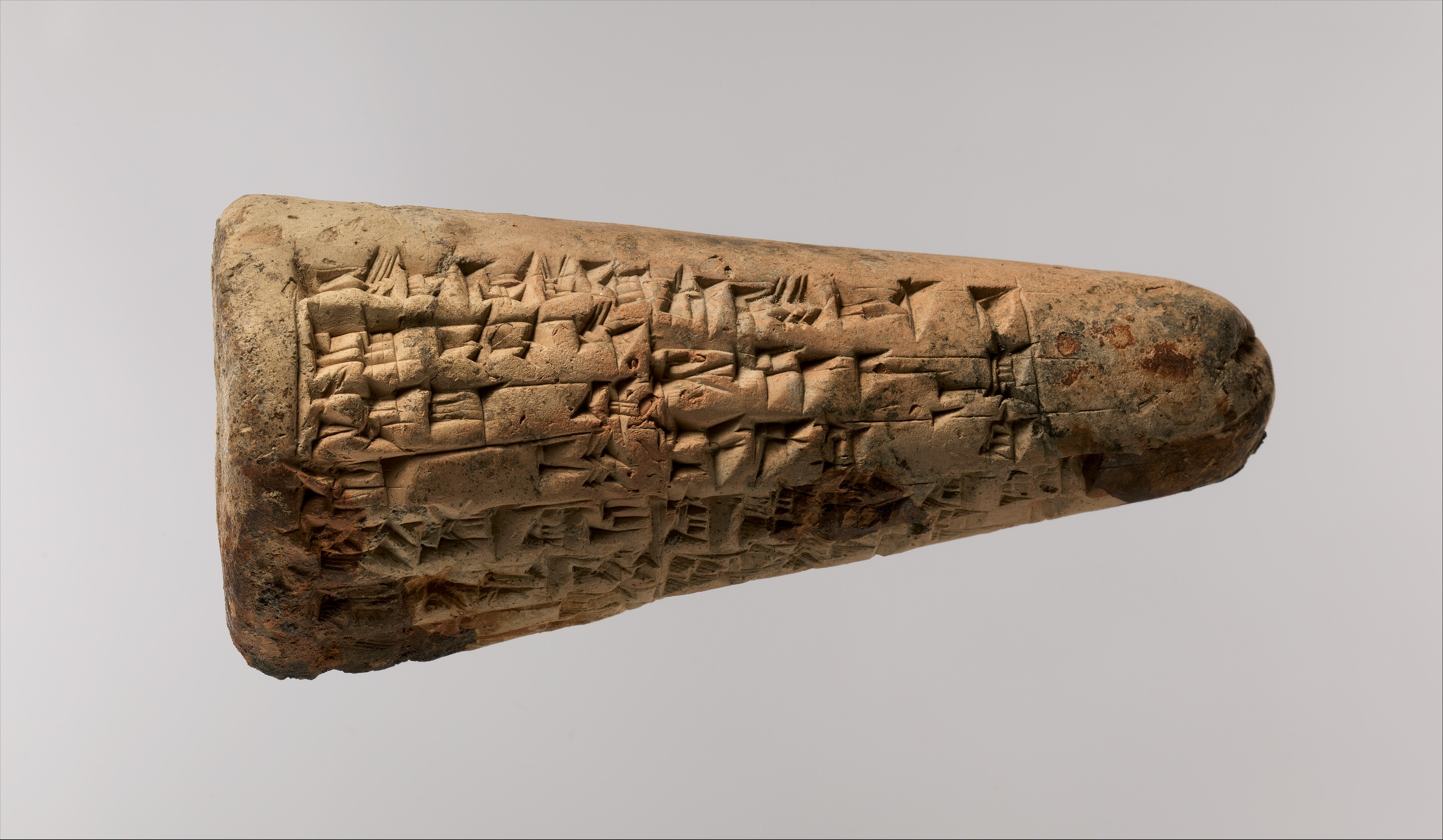
- Votive cone with cuneiform inscription of Lipit-Eshtar

King of Isin
- Reign: c. 1935 – c. 1924 BC
- Predecessor: Ishme-Dagan
- Successor: Ur-Ninurta
- Died: c. 1924 BC
- Dynasty: First Dynasty of Isin

Lipit-Ishtar (Akkadian: 𒇷𒁉𒀉𒁹𒁯, Lipit-Ištar; died c. 1924 BC) was the 5th king of the First Dynasty of Isin, according to the Sumerian King List. The King List notes that he was the son of Ishme-Dagan, and was succeeded by Ur-Ninurta. Some documents and royal inscriptions from his time have survived, however, Lipit-Ishtar is mostly known due to the Sumerian hymns that were written in his honor, as well as a legal code written in his name (preceding the famed Code of Hammurabi by about 100 years)—which were used for school instruction for hundreds of years after Lipit-Ishtar's death. The annals of Lipit-Ishtar's reign recorded that he also repulsed the Amorites.

He died when the king of neighboring Larsa, Gungunum attacked the kingdom of Isin.

== See also ==
- Isin
- Sumer
- Amorites
- Cuneiform law
- History of Sumer
- List of Mesopotamian dynasties

== Further Readings ==
- James R. Court, Codex Collections from Mesopotamia and Asia Minor. Scholars Press, 1995.
- Francis R. Steele, The Code of Lipit Ishtar - University of Pennsylvania Museum Monographs, 1948 - includes complete text and analysis of all fragments [reprinted from American Journal of Archaeology 52 (1948)]

Regnal titles
Preceded by Ishme-Dagan	King of Isin c. 1935 - c. 1924 BC	Succeeded by Ur-Ninurta
