= Erra-imitti =

Erra-Imitti 𒀭𒀴𒊏𒄿𒈪𒋾

King of Isin
- Reign: c. 1868 - c. 1861 BC
- Predecessor: Lipit-Enlil
- Died: c. 1861 BC
- Dynasty: First Dynasty of Isin

Erra-Imittī, (cuneiform: ^{d}èr-ra-i-mit-ti (Note: Ur-Isin King List 14.) or èr-ra-ZAG.LU (Note: Chronicle of Early Kings (ABC 20) A 31 to 36 and repeated as B 1 to 7.) meaning “Support of Erra”; died c. 1861 BC) was king of Isin, modern Ishan al-Bahriyat, and according to the Sumerian King List ruled for eight years. He succeeded Lipit-Enlil, with whom his relationship is uncertain and was a contemporary and rival of Sumuel and Nur-Adad of the dynasty of Larsa. He is best known for the legendary tale of his demise, Shaffer’s “gastronomic mishap”.

== Biography ==
He seems to have recovered control of Nippur from Larsa early in his reign but perhaps lost it again, as its recovery is celebrated again by his successor. The later regnal year-names offer some glimmer of events, for example “the year following the year Erra-Imittī seized Kisurra" (Note: BM 85348: mu ús-sa ki-sur-ra^{ki} ^{d}Ìr-ra-i-mi-ti ba-an-dib.) (the modern site of Abū-Ḥaṭab) for the date of a receipt for a bridal gift and “the year Erra-Imittī destroyed the city wall of Kazallu,” (Note: YOS 14 319: mu ^{d}Ìr-ra-i-mi-ti bàd ka-zal-lu^{ki} ba-gal.) a city allied with Larsa and antagonistic to Isin and its ally, Babylon. His conquest of Kisurra would have been a significant escalation of hostilities against Isin's rival Larsa. A haematite cylinder seal (Note: Cylinder seal BM 130695.) of his servant and scribe Iliška-uṭul, son of Sîn-ennam, has come to light from this city, suggesting prolonged occupation. The latest attested year-name gives the year he built the city wall of gan-x-Erra-Imittī, perhaps an eponymous new town.

When the omens predicted impending doom for a monarch, it was customary to appoint a substitute as a "statue though animate", (Note: NU-NÍG-SAG-ÍL-e.) a scape-goat who stood in the place of the king but did not exercise power for a hundred days to deflect the disaster, at the end of which the proxy and his spouse would be ritually slaughtered and the king would resume his throne. The Chronicle of Early Kings relates that:

^{d}Èr-ar-zà.dib lugal ^{d}En-l íl-dù ^{lú}nu.kiri_{6}
a-na nu nì.sag.gil^{e} ina ^{giš}gu.za-šú ú-še-šib
aga lugal^{ti-šú} ina sag.du-šú iš-ta-kan
^{d}Èr-ra-i-mit-ti ina é.gal-šú pap-pa-su im-me-tú in sa-ra-pi-šú im-tu-ut
^{d}En-l íl-dù šá in ^{giš}gu.za ú-ši-bi ul it-bi^{im-tu-ut}
a-na lugal ^{ú-ti}it-taš-kan

Translation: King Erra-imittī ordered Enlil-bâni, the gardener, to sit on the throne as a royal substitute (and) put the crown of kingship on his head. Erra-imittī died in his palace while swallowing hot porridge (Note: pappasu = a porridge, in CAD “p” vol. 12 (2005), p. 111, other translators say soup or broth.) in little sips. Enlil-bâni, who sat on the throne, did not resign and was elevated to the royal office.

— Chronicle of early kings, after Glassner but with correction

Presumably his error was to remain in the palace while the substitute ceremony was conducted. While the tale may be apocryphal, it provides a literary demarcation between dynasties. He was succeeded by Ikun-pi-Istar, according to two variant copies of the Sumerian King List, or Enlil-bani, if the other sources are correct.

== See also ==
- Chronology of the ancient Near East
- List of Mesopotamian dynasties
