= Enlil-bani =

Enlil-bani 𒀭𒂗𒆤𒁀𒉌

King of Isin
- Reign: c. 1860 - c. 1836 BC
- Successor: Zambiya
- Died: c. 1836 BC
- Dynasty: 1st Dynasty of Isin

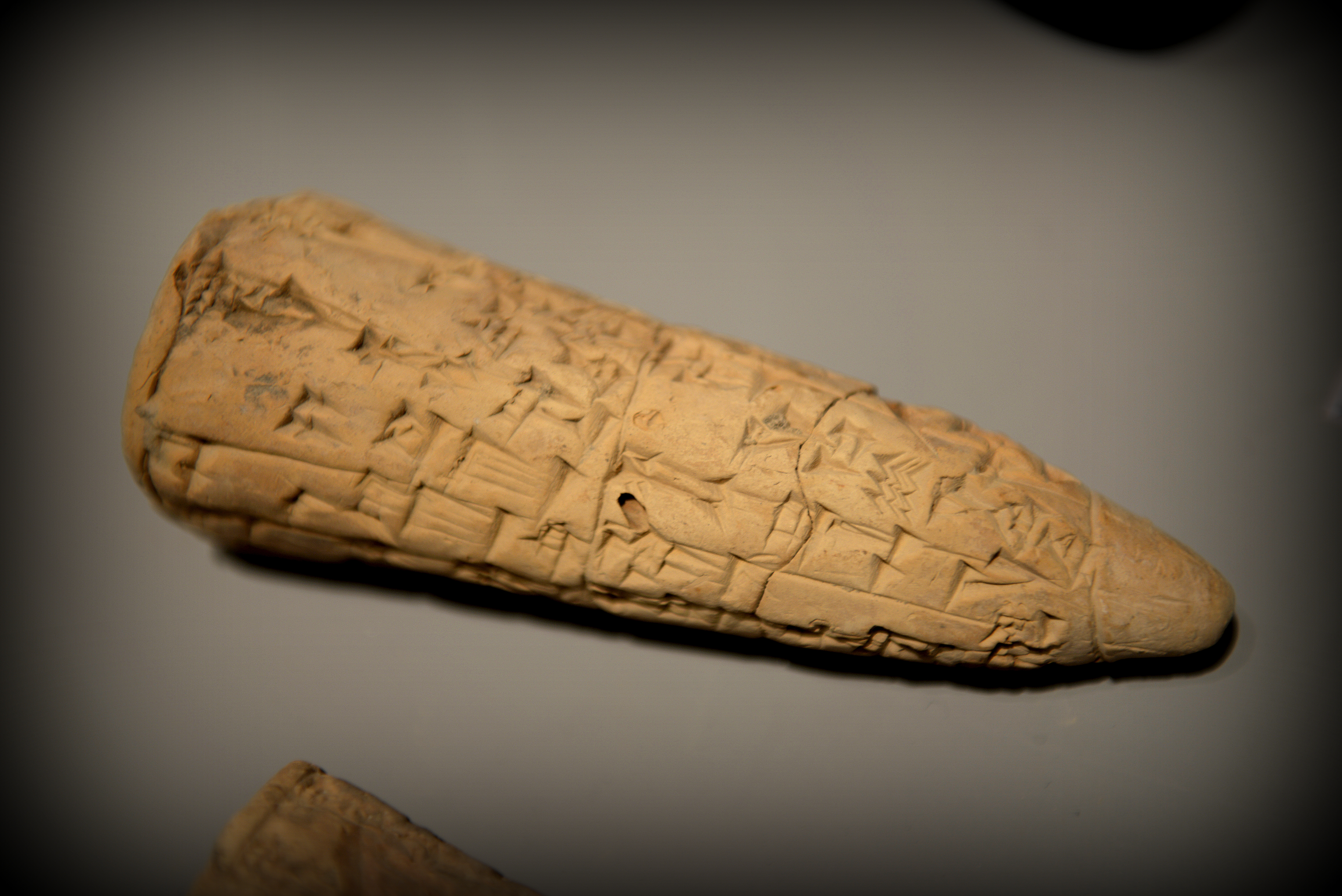
Foundation Cone of Enlil-Bani

Enlil-bani (Note: Inscribed ^{d}En-líl-dù or ^{d}En-líl-ba-ni.) (𒀭𒂗𒆤𒁀𒉌; died c. 1836 BC) was the 10th king of the 1st Dynasty of Isin and reigned 24 years according to the Ur-Isin kinglist. (Note: Ur-Isin kinglist line 15.) He is best known for the legendary and perhaps apocryphal manner of his ascendancy: legend claims that he was a gardener selected by Erra-imitti for the "substitute king ritual" to rule during a period of evil omens before being sacrificed. When Erra-imitti unexpectedly died, Enlil-bani remained on the throne and continued to reign for decades.

== Biography ==
A certain Ikūn-pî-Ištar (Note: I-k[u-un]-pi-Iš_{8}-tár.) is recorded as having ruled for 6 months or a year, between the reigns of Erra-imitti and Enlil-bani according to two variant copies of a chronicle. Another chronicle (Note: The Babylonian chronicle fragment 1 B ii 1-8.) which might have shed further light on his origins is too broken to translate. A lengthy inscription proclaims:

In Nippur I established justice, and promoted righteousness. I sought out nourishment for them like sheep, and fed them with fresh grass. I removed the heavy yoke from their necks and settled them down in a firm place. Having established justice in Nippur and made their hearts content, I established justice and righteousness in Isin and made the heart of the land content. I reduced the barley-tax, which had been at one-fifth, to one-tenth. The muškēnum (Note: The muškēnum were a class between freemen and slaves.) served only four days in the month. The livestock of the palace had grazed on the fields of ... who had cried out with the appeal, "O Šamaš" - I turned the palace livestock out of their ploughed fields and banished those people's cries of "O Šamaš".

— Enlil-bāni Inscription, CBS 13909 (Note: CBS 13909 in the University Museum, Philadelphia.)

Hegemony over Nippur was fleeting, with control of the city passing back and forth between Isin and Larsa several times. Uruk, too, seceded during his reign and, as his power crumbled, he may have had the Chronicle of Early Kings (Note: Chronicle of early kings A 31-36, B 1-7.) redacted to provide a more legendary tale of his accession than the rather mundane act of usurpation that it may well have been. It relates that Erra-Imittī selected his gardener, Enlil-bâni, enthroned him, and placed the royal tiara on his head as part of the "substitute king ritual"--during periods of bad omens, such as eclipses, rulers would briefly abdicate the throne before returning and putting the substitute king to death. But according to the legend, Erra-Imittī died while eating hot porridge before he reclaimed the throne, and Enlil-bâni refused to abdicate.

The colophon of a medical text, (Note: Tablet K.4023 column iv lines 21 to 25.) "when a man's brain contains fire", (Note: Enuma amelu muḫḫu-šu išata u-kal.) from the Library of Ashurbanipal reads: "Proven and tested salves and poultices, fit for use, according to the old sages from before the flood (Note: (21) [na]p-šá-la-tú tak-ṣi-ra-nu lat-ku-tu_{4} ba-ru-ti šá ana [Š]u šu-ṣú-ú (22) šá KA NUN.ME.MEŠ-e la-bi-ru-ti šá la-am A.MÁ.URU_{5}(abūbi) (23) šá ana LAMXKUR^{ki}(šuruppak) MU.2.KÁM ^{Id}EN.LĺL-ba-ni LUGAL ^{uru}Ì.ŠI.IN^{ki} (24) ^{Id}EN.LĺL-mu-bal-liṭ NUN.ME NIBRU^{ki} [ez]-bu.) from Šuruppak, which Enlil-muballiṭ, sage (apkallu) of Nippur, left (to posterity) in the second year of Enlil-bāni."

Enlil-bani found it necessary to "build anew the wall of Isin which had become dilapidated," (Note: Cones IM 77922, CBS 16200, and 8 others.) which he recorded on commemorative cones. He named the wall Enlil-bāni-išdam-kīn, (Note: Two cones, IM 10789 and UCLM 94791.) "Enlil-bāni is firm as to foundation." In practice, the walls of major cities were probably under continuous repair. He was a prodigious builder, responsible for the construction of the é-ur-gi_{7}-ra, "the dog house", (Note: Cone 74.4.9.249 and another in a private collection in Wiesbaden.) temple of Ninisina, a palace, (Note: Clay impression, IM 25874.) also the é-ní-dúb-bu, "house of relaxation", for the goddess Nintinugga, "lady who revives the dead", (Note: Cone in Chicago A 7555.) the é-dim-gal-an-na, "house - great mast of heaven", (Note: IM 79940.) for the tutelary deity of Šuruppak, the goddess Sud, and finally, the é-ki-ág-gá-ni for Ninibgal, the "lady with patient mercy who loves ex-votos, who heeds prayers and entreaties, his shining mother", (Note: NBC 8955 and A 7461 inscription on two cones.) Two large copper statues were taken to Nippur for dedication to Ningal, which Iddin-Dagān had fashioned 117 years earlier but had been unable to deliver, "on account of this, the goddess Ninlil had the god Enlil lengthen the life span of Enlil-Bāni." (Note: Tablet UM L-29-578.) He is recorded, in two foundation nails, as having built (or possibly rebuilt) a temple to the goddess Annunitum.

There are perhaps two hymns addressed to this monarch.

== See also ==
- Chronology of the ancient Near East
- List of Mesopotamian dynasties
