= Lipit-Enlil =

Lipit-Enlil 𒀭𒇷𒁉𒀉𒀭𒂗𒆤

King of Isin
- Reign: c. 1874 - c. 1868 BC
- Predecessor: Bur-Suen
- Successor: Erra-imitti
- Died: c. 1868 BC
- Dynasty: First Dynasty of Isin
- Father: Bur-Suen

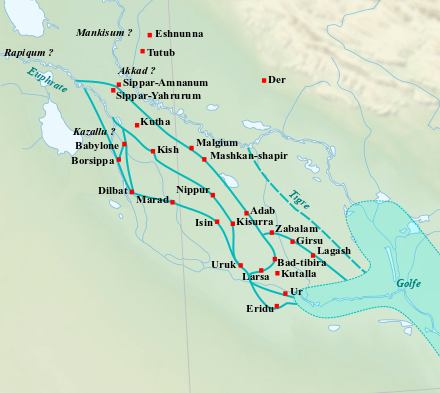
Location map of the main cities of Lower Mesopotamia during the Old Babylonian period (2004-1595 BC).

Lipit-Enlil, written ^{d}li-pí-it ^{d}en.líl, where the Sumerian King List (Note: The Sumerian King List Ash. 1923.444, the Wend-Blundell prism.) and the Ur-Isin king list (Note: MS 1686, the Ur-Isin king list.) match on his name and reign (died c. 1868 BC), was the 8th king of the 1st dynasty of Isin and ruled for around five years, c. 1874–1868 BC (MC). He was a son of Bur-Suen.

== Biography ==
There are no inscriptions known for this king. His brief reign ended a period of relative stability and he was succeeded by Erra-imitti whose filiation is unknown, as the Sumerian King List omits this information from this point on. Both he and his successor were conspicuous in the absence of royal hymns or dedicatory prayers and Hallo speculates this may have been due to the distractions afforded by the commencement of conflict with Larsa.

The archives of the temple of Ninurta, the é-šu-me-ša_{4}, in Nippur, extended over more than 75 years, from year 1 of Lipit-Enlil of Isin (1875) to year 28 of Rim-Sin I (1794) and were inadvertently preserved when they were used as infill for the temple of Inanna in the Parthian period. The 420 fragments show a thriving temple economy absorbing much of the available wealth. The year-names following his accession year all somewhat monotonously commemorate generous gifts to the temple of Enlil.

== See also ==
- Chronology of the ancient Near East
- List of Mesopotamian dynasties
