= Iter-pisha =

Iter-pisha 𒀭𒄿𒋼𒅕𒅗𒊭

King of Isin
- Reign: c. 1833 - c. 1829 BC
- Predecessor: Zambiya
- Successor: Ur-du-kuga
- Died: c. 1829 BC
- Dynasty: 1st Dynasty of Isin

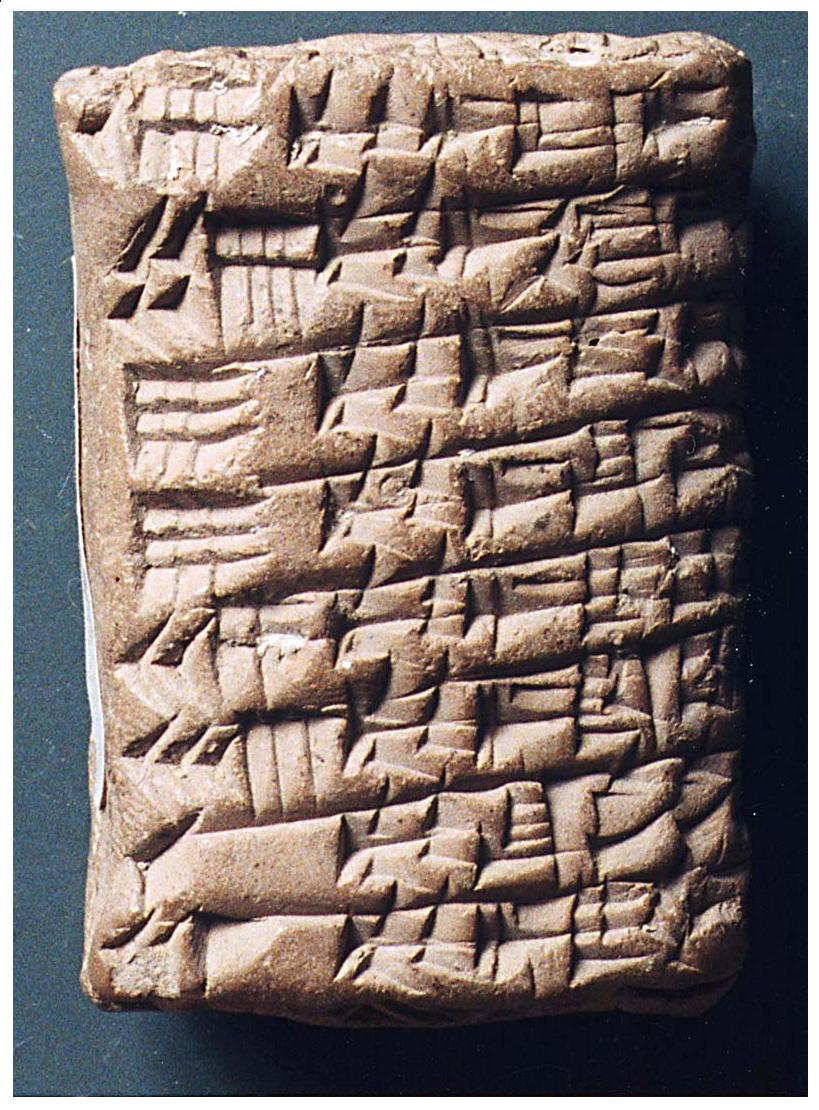
Tablet with the List of Kings of Ur and Isin (MS 1686)

Iter-pisha, inscribed in cuneiform as i-te-er-pi/pi_{4}-ša and meaning "Her command is surpassing", (died c. 1829 BC) was the 12th king of Isin during the Old Babylonian period. The Sumerian King List (Note: Sumerian King List, Ash. 1923.444, the "Weld-Blundell Prism.") tells us that "the divine Iter-pisha ruled for 4 years." (Note: ^{d}i.te.er.pi_{4}.ša mu 4 i.ak.) The Ur-Isin King List (Note: Ur-Isin King List tablet MS 1686.) which was written in the 4th year of the reign of Damiq-ilishu gives a reign of just 3 years. His relationships with his predecessor and successor are uncertain and his reign falls during a period of general decline in the fortunes of the dynasty.

== Biography ==
He was a contemporary of Warad-Sin, the king of Larsa, whose brother and successor, Rim-Sin I would eventually come to overthrow the dynasty, ending the cities' bitter rivalry around 40 years later. He is only known from King lists and year-name date formulae in several contemporary legal and administrative texts. Two of his year-names refer to his provision of a copper Lilis for Utu and Inanna respectively, where Lilissu is a kettledrum used in temple rituals.

He is perhaps best known for the literary work generally known as the letter from Nabi-Enlil to Iter-pisha formerly designated letter from Iter-pisha to a deity, when its contents were less well understood. It is extant in seven fragmentary manuscripts (Note: Tablets UM 55-21-329 +, 3N-T0901,048, 3N-T 919,455, CBS 7857, UM 55-21-323, and CBS 14041 + in the University of Pennsylvania Museum, and MS 2287 in the Schøyen Collection.) and seems to be a petition to the king from a subject who has fallen on hard times. It is a 24-line composition that had become a belle letter used in scribal education during the subsequent Old Babylonian period.

== See also ==
- Chronology of the ancient Near East
- List of Mesopotamian dynasties
