= Tell Sifr =

- Kutalla?
- Location within Iraq
- 31°17′33″N 45°57′57″E
- Type: settlement
- Periods: Bronze Age
- Cultures: Old Babylonian
- Location: Iraq

History
- Built: c. 2000 BC

Site notes
- Excavation dates: 1854
- Archaeologists: William Loftus
- Condition: Ruined
- Owner: Public
- Public access: Yes

Tell Sifr is an ancient Near East archaeological site in Dhi Qar Governorate Iraq generally thought to be the small ancient town of Kutalla. It lies about nine miles east from the ancient city of Larsa. The city lay on a branch of the ancient Iturungal canal that also runs to Bad-tibira.

"Two effluents took off from the left bank of the Iturungal, the Id-Ninaki-gen-a, which over Bzeikh (Zabalam) flowed to Telloh (Girsu), al Hibba (Uru-ku, Lagas?), and Surghul (Nina), and an anonymous branch which takes off from a point north of Mansuriyah, passes well to the east of Madi-nah (Bäd-tibira), and continues south-east down to a small mound also called Madi-nah. A branch takes off from the right bank and runs to Tell Sifr (Kutalla)."

Not to be confused with the Iron Age site of Tell Sifr near Aleppo in Syria.

== History ==
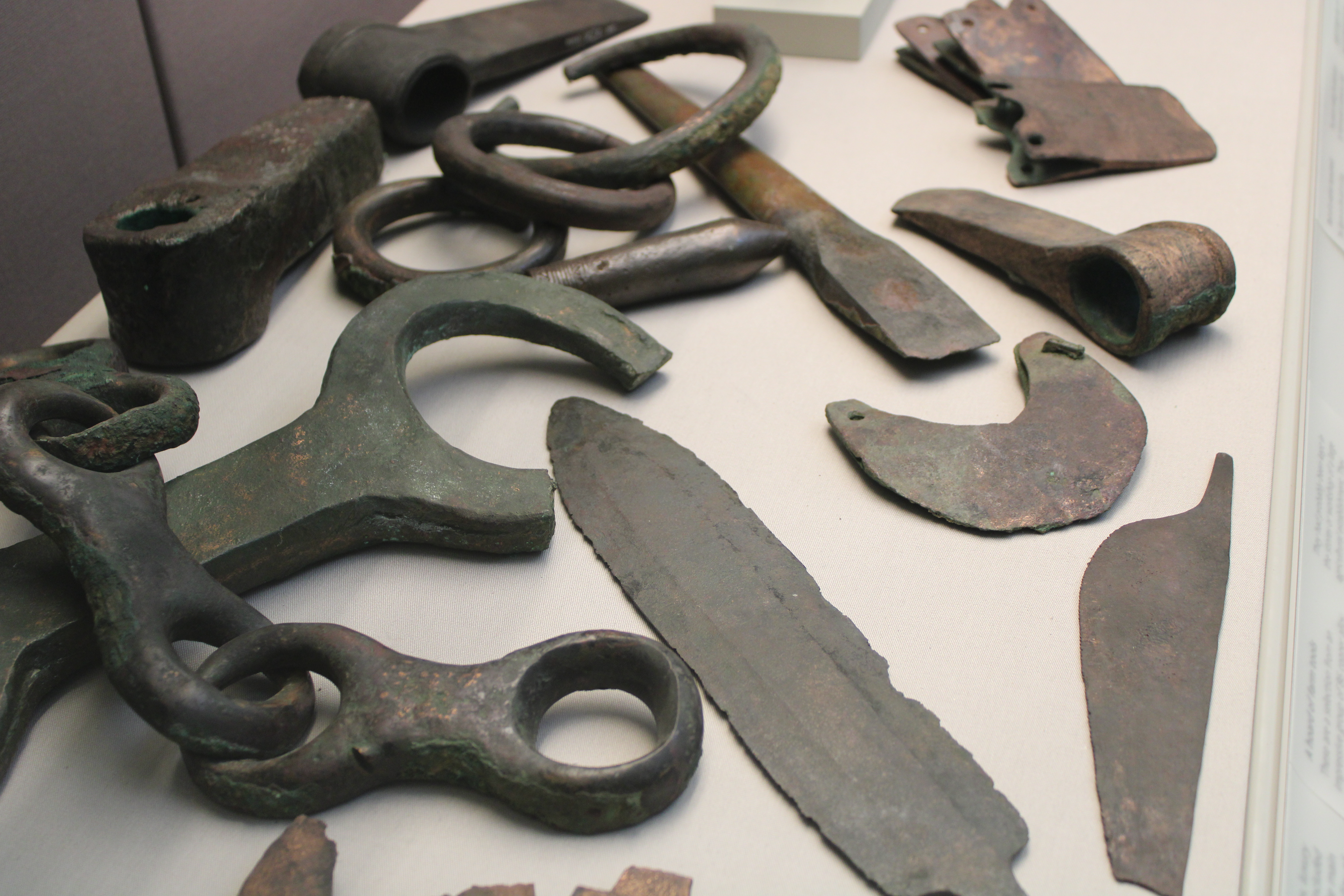
Copper alloy tools Tell Sifr BM

The site was occupied in the Isin-Larsa and Old Babylonian periods. In Parthian times it was used as a cemetery. The Parthian graves are brick vaulted oblongs and painted red inside.

== Archaeology ==
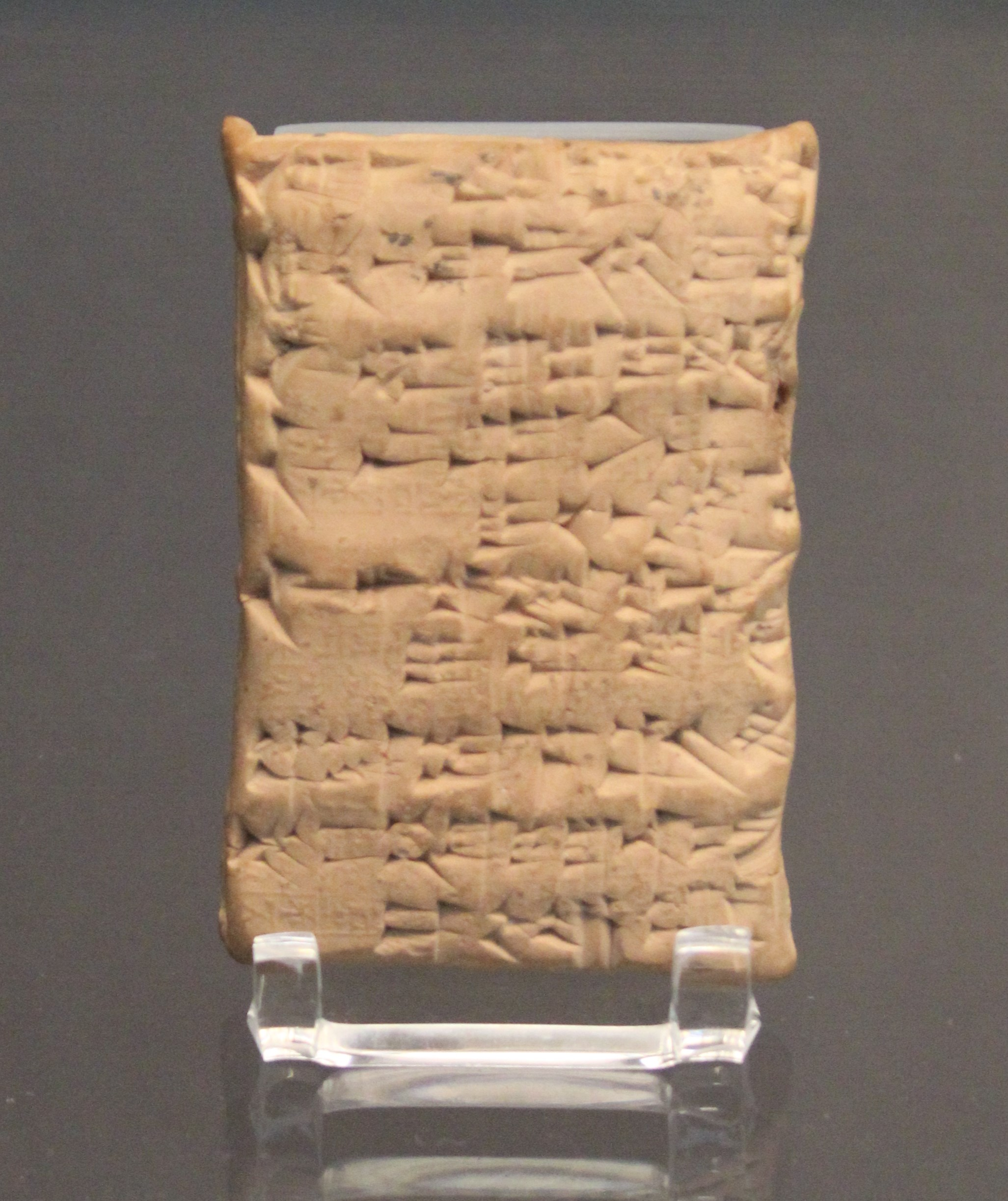
Contract for a loan of silver - Tell Sifr BM 33257

The site is a small conical mound on top of a platform of about 40 feet in height. It was excavated by a crew of William Loftus for a few days in 1854. A number of unbaked clay cuneiform tablets were found, many "enveloped". The tablets, 100 in total with most complete, were found in a brick structure, protected by reed matting. The envelopes partially surrounding the tablets were also inscribed and sealed using cylinder seals. An Old Babylonian period assemblage of copper tools was found.

"large chaldrons, vases, small dislies, and dice-boxes (?); hammers, chisels, adzes, and hatchets; a large assortment of knives and daggers of various sizes and shapes—all unfinished; massive and smaller rings; a pair of prisoner's fetters; three links of a strong chain; a ring weight; several plates resembling horses' shoes, divided at the heel for the insertion of a handle, and having; two holes in each for pins; other plates of a different shape, which were probably primitive hatchets; an ingot of copper, and a great weight of dross from the same smelted metal. There was likewise a small fragment of a bitumen bowl overlaid with thin copper; and a piece of lead."

The copper assemblage, which had also been wrapped in reed matting, and the tablets are now held at the British Museum. The tablets were later published. They were dated to the reigns of Larsa king Rim-Sin, and Babylon kings Hammurabi and Samsu-iluna. Most come from the family archive of one Sillii-Eshtar and his brother Awil-ili, sons of Ilu-Sukkal. While the brothers were active for about 20 years the texts in the archive include earlier texts dating back to Nur-Adad, Rim-Sin, and Warad-Sin of Larsa Most of the texts were sealed, some multiple times and 200 different seals were found. After further analysis it has been suggested that one third of the tablets actually came from Ur (excavated by J. E. Taylor) and were inadvertently mixed in with the Loftus tablets from Tell Sifr during shipping. Mislabeled Tell Sifr text actually from Ur are "1–2, 4–9, 11, 13–16, 20–26, 87–94, 96–98, and 105–10". Some additional Tell Sifr have since appeared resulting from clandestine excavation. Most of the texts involve property and legal maters. One snippet from a tablet reads:

"They went to the judges and the judges sent them to the city and the elders, (where) at the Gate of Sin stood the divine emblem of Sin (Siurinnu-sa-Sîn), the divine bird of Nin-mar, the divine spade of Marduk (Marru(m)-Ía-Marduk), (and) the divine weapon of Abnum."

== Kutalla ==
Larsa king Silli-Adad (c. 1771–1770 BC) referred to himself as the governor of Kutalla (ku-ta-al-la^{ki}) in a brick inscription found at Ur "... provider of Nippur, governor of Ur, Larsa, Lagas, and the land (ma-da) of Kutalla ...". His successor Warad-Sin used that same royal tutelary on an inscribed cone. In one of his writings Hammurabi refers to an orchard keeper from Kutalla:

"To Shamash-hazir, speak! Thus says Hammurabi. Sin-ishme’anni of Kutalla the orchard keeper of the Dilmun date-palms, has informed me as follows: “Shamash-hazir expropriated from me a field of my paternal estate and gave it to a soldier.” ..."

In the time of Samsu-iluna (c. 1749–1712 BC), ruler of Babylon, it is known that one Ili-ippalsam served as a rabiãnum (mayor) in Kutalla.

A god, possibly the city god, known to reside at Kutalla was Lugal-ki-suna (^{d}lugal-ki-sun_{5}-na, Lugal-kiduna, Lugal-ki-bura). A deified symbol of Marduk, Marru(m)-Ía-Marduk, the "Spade of Marduk" is also attested there. The 18th year name of Larsa ruler Gungunum read "Year the temple of Lugal-kiduna was built" (mu e ^{d}lugal-ki-du-na ba-du).

== See also ==
- Cities of the ancient Near East
