= Suen-magir =

Sîn-māgir 𒀭𒂗𒍪𒈠𒄫

King of Isin
- Reign: c. 1825 - c. 1814 BC
- Predecessor: Ur-du-kuga
- Successor: Damiq-ilishu
- Died: c. 1814 BC
- Issue: Damiq-ilishu
- Dynasty: 1st Dynasty of Isin

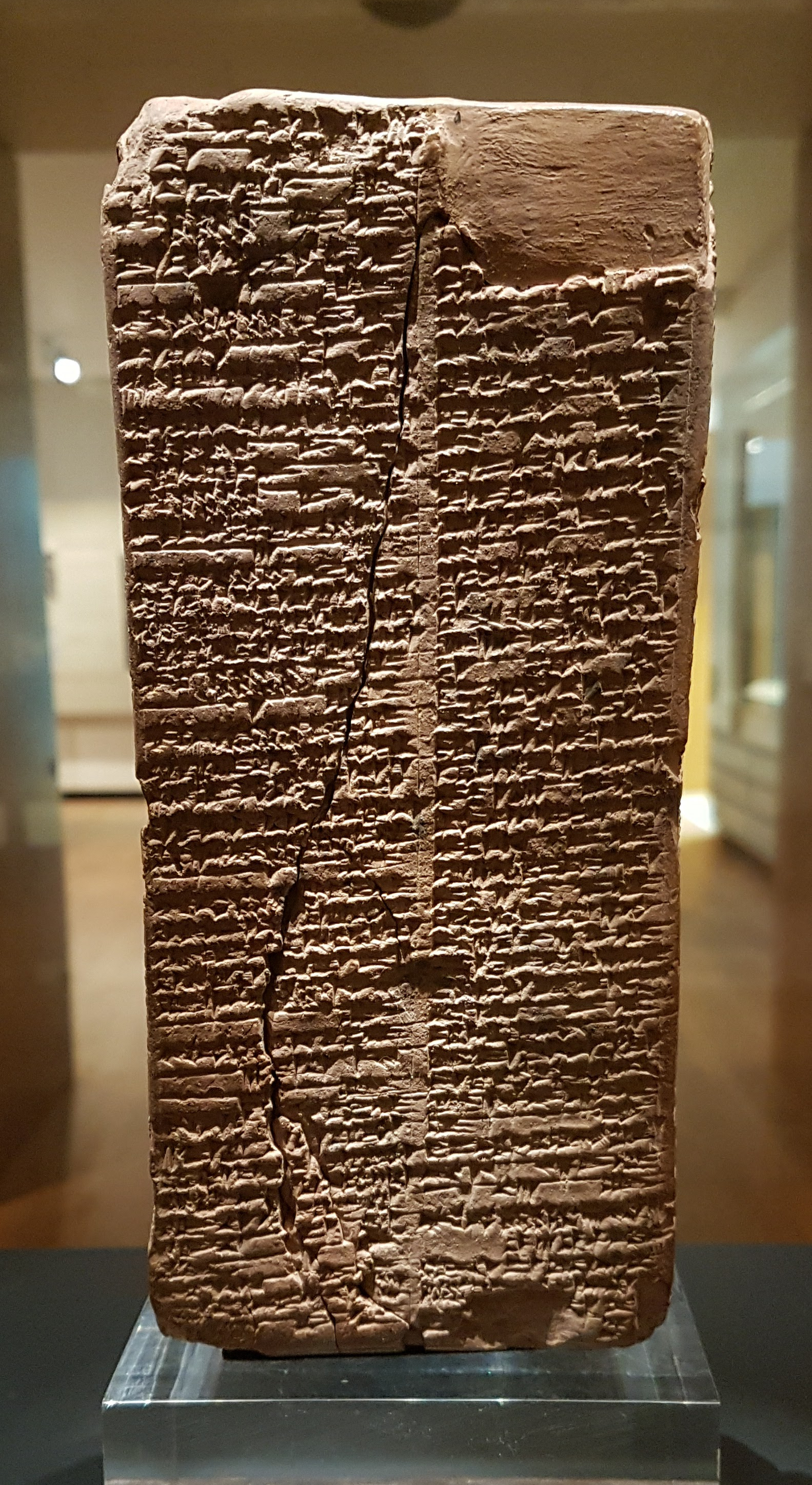
The Weld-Blundell Prism bearing the Sumerian King List in which Sîn-māgir appears as the last ruler, was probably made during his reign or soon after

Sîn-māgir (Akkadian: 𒀭𒂗𒍪𒈠𒄫, ^{D}suen-ma-gir, inscribed ^{d}EN.ZU-ma-gir, “Sîn upholds,”; died c. 1814 BC) was the 14th king of Isin and reigned for around 11 years. (Note: Sumerian King Lists Ash. 1923.444 and CBS 19797 and Ur-Isin king list MS 1686.)

== Biography ==
His reign falls over the last six years of Warad-Sin and the first five of Rim-Sin I, the sons of Kudur-Mabuk and successive kings of Larsa, and wholly within the reign of the Babylonian monarch Apil-Sin. There are currently six extant royal inscriptions, including brick palace inscriptions, (Note: Brick, IM 78635.) seals for his devoted servants, such as Iddin-damu, his “chief builder,” and Imgur-Sîn, his administrator, and a cone (Note: Cone A 16750.) which records the construction of a storehouse for the goddess Aktuppītum of Kiritab in his honor commissioned by Nupṭuptum, the lukur priestess or concubine, “his beloved traveling escort, mother of his first-born.”

An inscription (Note: IB 1610, from Isin, a complete cone and VA Bab 628, 609, from Babylon, parts of a single cone.) marks the construction of a defensive wall, called Dūr-Sîn-māgir, “Sîn-māgir makes the foundation of his land firm,” at Dunnum, a city northeast of Nippur. Control of Nippur itself however may have shifted to Larsa, under the rule of Warad-Sin and his father, Kudur-Mabuk, the power behind the throne, as his sixth year-name celebrates that he “had (14 copper statues brought into Nippur and) 3 thrones adorned with gold brought into the temples of Nanna, Ningal, and Utu.” Larsa was to retain Nippur until year nine of Rīm-Sîn when it was lost to Damiq-ilishu. One of the cones bearing this inscription was found in the ruins of the temple of Ninurta, the é-ḫur-sag-tí-la, in Babylon, and is thought likely to have been an ancient museum piece. The city of Dunnum, the celebration of whose original foundation may have been the purpose of the Dynasty of Dunnum myth, was taken by Rim-Sin the year before he conquered Isin and so it is conjectured that the cone was taken from Larsa as booty by Ḫammu-rapī.

Two legal tablets offered for private sale, recording sales of a storehouse and palm grove, give a year-name elsewhere unattested, “year Sîn-māgir the king dug the Ninkarrak canal.” (Note: Tablets with dealer references LO.1250 and LO.1253.) Another year-name marks "(Sîn-māgir) built on the bank of the Iturungal canal (the old wadi) a great fortification (called) Sîn-māgir-madana-dagal-dagal (Sîn-māgir broadens his country)." A province in the south and a town in eastern Babylonia near Tuplias are both called Bīt-Sîn-māgir and some historians have speculated one or other were named in his honor.

== See also ==
- Chronology of the ancient Near East
- List of Mesopotamian dynasties
