= Zambiya =

Zambiya 𒀭𒍝𒄠𒁉𒅀

King of Isin
- Reign: c. 1836 - c. 1833 BC
- Predecessor: Enlil-bani
- Successor: Iter-pisha
- Died: c. 1833 BC
- Dynasty: 1st Dynasty of Isin

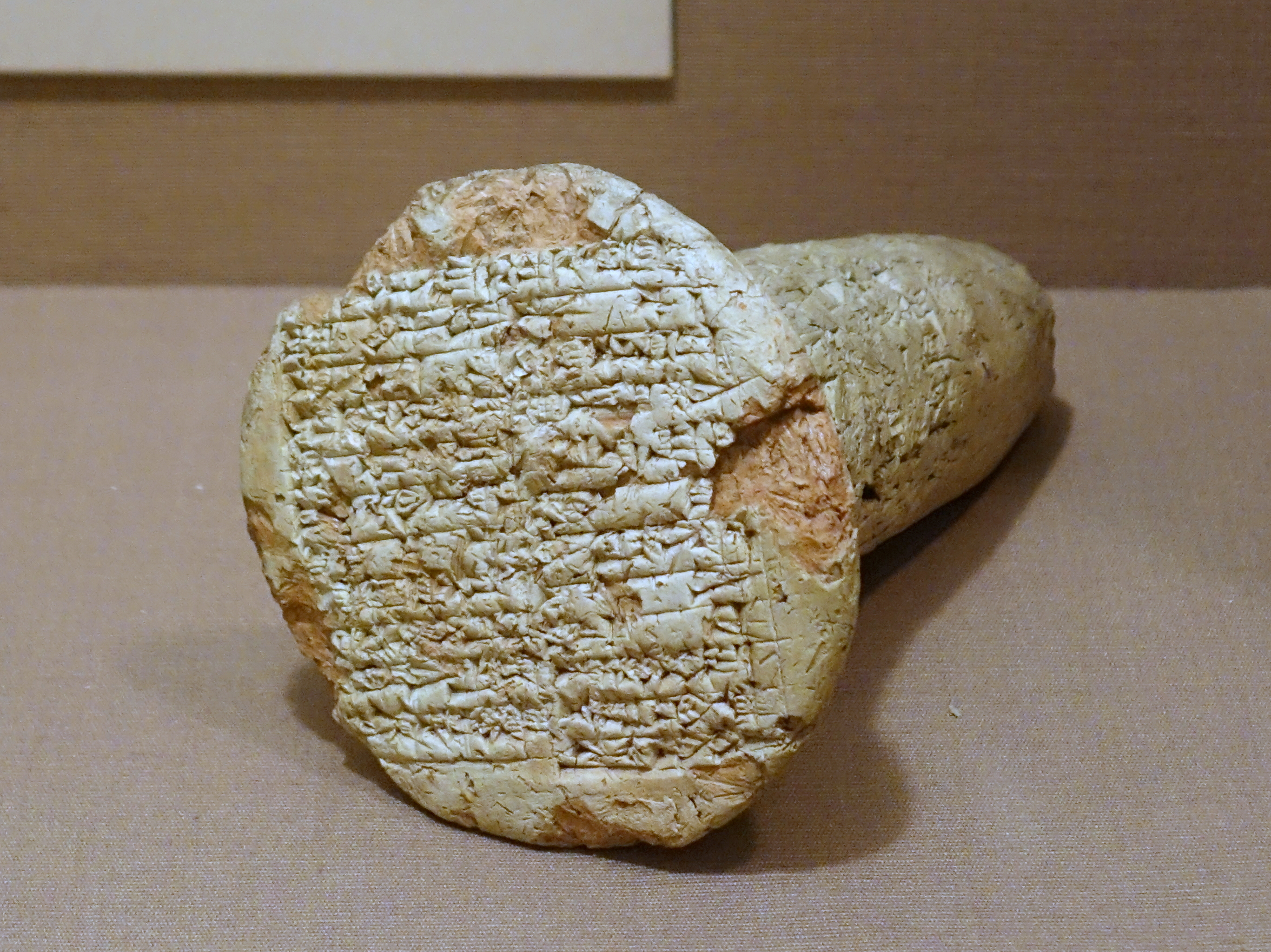
Inscribed Cone of King Zambiya of Isin, Isin-Larsa period, reign of Zambiya, c. 1835 BC, baked clay - Oriental Institute Museum, University of Chicago

Zambiya, ^{d}za-am-bi-ia, (died c. 1833 BCE), was the 11th king of the 1st Dynasty of Isin. He is best known for his defeat at the hands of Sin-Iqisham, king of Larsa.

== Biography ==
According to the Sumerian King List, (Note: The Sumerian King List, WB 444, Ash. 1923.444, the Weld-Blundell prism.) Zambiya reigned for 3 years. He was a contemporary of Sin-Iqisham. king of Larsa, whose fifth and final year-name celebrates his victory over Zambiya: “year the army of (the land of) Elam (and Zambīia (the king of Isin),) was/were defeated by arms,” suggesting a confederation between Isin and Elam against Larsa. The city of Nippur was hotly contested between the city-states. If Zambiya survived this battle, he may have possibly gone on to be contemporary with Sin-iqišam’s successors, Silli-Adad and Warad-Sin.

A single inscription is known for this king, on cone fragments, (Note: A 7557, IM 77073.) which reads:

Zambīia, the shepherd who reveres Nippur, farmer who brings tall flax and grain for Duranki, true provider, who fills the courtyard of the Egalmaḫ with abundant things, king of Isin, king of the land of Sumer and Akkad, spouse chosen by the goddess Inanna, beloved of the god Enlil and the goddess Ninisina, built the great wall of Isin. The name of that wall is “Zambīia is the beloved of the goddess Ištar”.

— Zambīia, Commemorative inscription for great wall of Isin

A votive dedication to the goddess Nanshe on behalf of Zambiya was copied from an inscription on a bronze buck.

== See also ==
- Chronology of the ancient Near East
- List of Mesopotamian dynasties
