= Iturungal canal =

Ancient canal in Mesopotamia

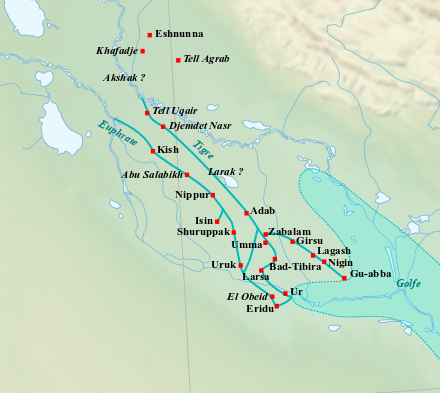
Lower Mesopotamia

The Iturungal canal (id₂-en-urin-gal, id₂-en-urin-gal-ka) was a major waterway in Sumer used for commercial and religious functions. It is unclear when it was built but it existed by the middle 3rd millennium BC and remained in use for several millennia. Mesopotamia was crisscrossed by numerous canals. Some were short distance links between cities and between main canals and cities. Canals were also modified, repaired, and sometime extended with the passage of time. As new cities rose and others were abandoned new canals were built and others fell out of use. The Iturungal canal was a long haul canal which transected Mesopotamia roughly north to south. The Id-Ka-sahar canal served similar duty further north. Much is uncertain about the Iturungal partly because of current gaps in archaeology but also because it too changed over time, changes especially driven by the shifting Euphrates River (and in some cases the Tigris river). Some of its course and some of the cites it flowed past are now more certain. The canal had many different spelling over its history including Id-en-urin-gal, Id-en-urin-gal, Id-EREN-nun-na, Id-en-urin-gal, En-er en-gal, I-tu-ru-un-gal, I-su-ru(-en)-gal, I-dar-en-gal, and Id-dur-an-gal. The course of the Euphrates changed over time, especially around 800 BC when it was briefly called Arahtu, and its main course is called Purattu. Both branches may have, for a time, existed together.

Currently, the Iturungal canal is generally considered, based on hydrology and textual sources, to have originated at the Tigris river downstream from Karkar (Tell Jidr?), passed through the unlocated city of NagSu, and flowed toward Uruk joining the Euphrates river just south of that city. Much of its course would have run in the province of Umma.

Earlier it was believed that it branched off the Euphrates (or was actually a secondary branch of that river) near Sippar then went on to Kish and then Nippur. An alternate view had it splitting from the main Euphrates channel (Buranun/Purattu) north of Nippur passing on to Adab, then south to Zabalam, Umma, and Bad-tibira at which point it returned to the main Euphrates channel. The Sirara canal branched off the Iturungal canal at Zabalam and proceeded to Lagash in this view. It was even suggested that the Iturungal canal was actually the Tigris river. This is complicated by varying translation of and interpretation of textual sources.

It is known that there were sub branches off the Iturungal including Íd-Nina^{ki}-du-a and Nanna-gú-gal. The city of Kutalla lay on such a branch that also ran to Bad-tibira. The Magura canal flowed between the Tigris and the Iturungal in the area of Umma and Apišal.

"Two effluents took off from the left bank of the Iturungal, the Id-Ninaki-gen-a, which over Bzeikh (Zabalam) flowed to Telloh (Girsu), al Hibba (Uru-ku, Lagas?), and Surghul (Nina), and an anonymous branch which takes off from a point north of Mansuriyah, passes well to the east of Madi-nah (Bäd-tibira), and continues south-east down to a small mound also called Madi-nah. A branch takes off from the right bank and runs to Tell Sifr (Kutalla)."

A survey of some of the course of the canal near Girsu found a number of archaeological mound dating to the Early Dynastic period with some continuing into the Old Babylonian period.

The archaeological site of Tell Jidr (possibly Karkar) lies on the Iturungal canal.

It is known that the Iturungal canal connected Uruk and Garšana.

== History ==
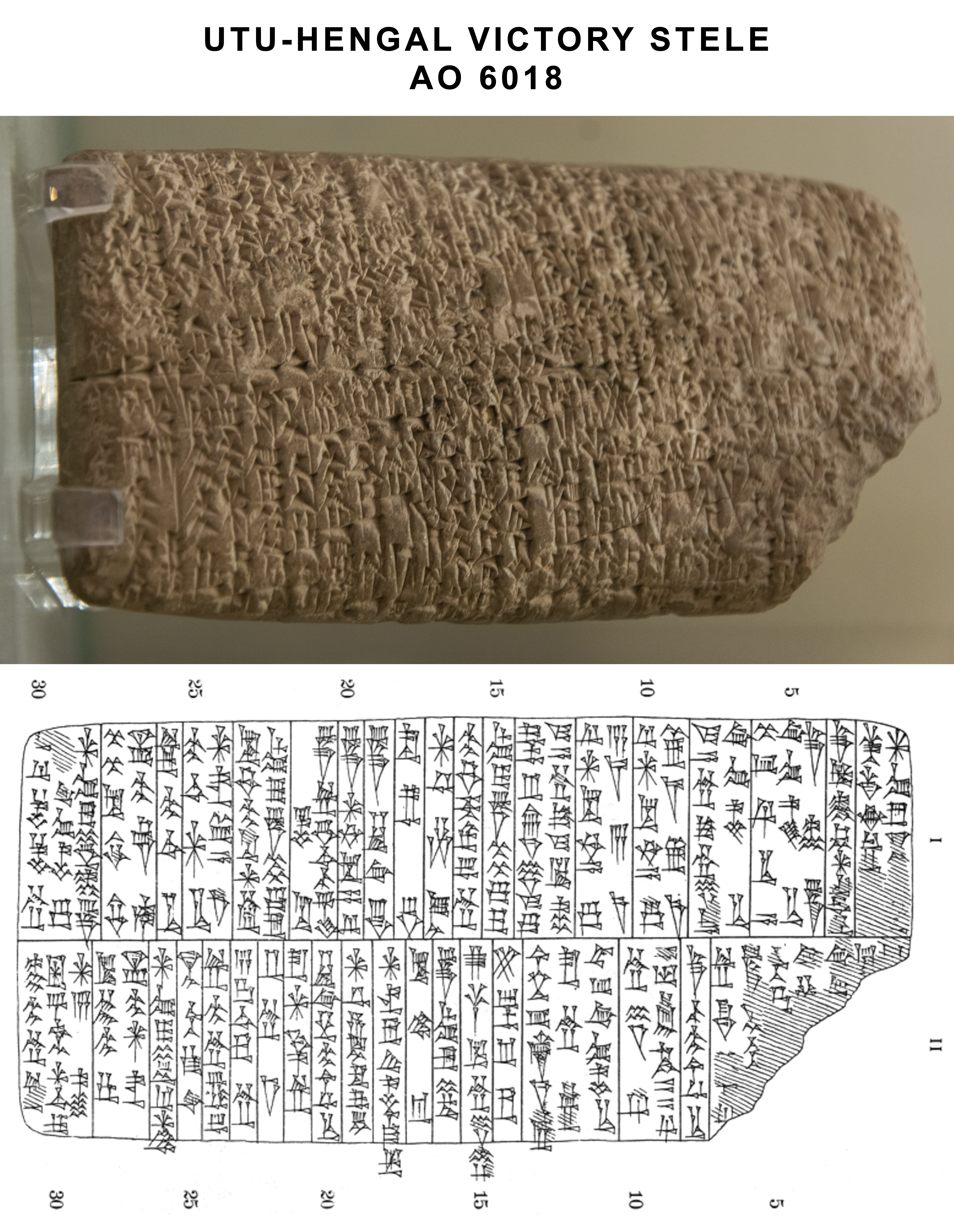
Utu-Hengal victory stele AO 6018 (photograph and transcription of the obverse)

In the Tablet of Utu-hengal by the Uruk ruler Utu-hengal (c. 2119–2112 BC) describing his victory over the Gutians "He (Utu-hegal) arranged in correct array his select elite troops. After he (Utu-hegal) departed (from) the temple of the god Iškur, on the fourth day he set up... in the city of Nagsu on the Iturungal canal."

An illegally excavated cone said to have been found at Tell al-Madineh marked the construction by Ur-Nammu (c. 2100 BC), a ruler of the Ur III empire, of the Iturungal canal though it may have already existed in some form.

"For the goddess Inanna, [la]dy of Eanna, his lady, Ur-Nammu, mighty man, king of Ur, king of the lands of Sumer and Akkad, dug for her the Iturungal canal, her beloved canal"

Ur III ruler Amar-Sin (c. 2046–2037 BC) is known, in his years 2 to 6, to have built a canal (i₇-^{d}Amar-^{d}EN.ZU-ĝar/ĝa₂-ra) joining the Euphrates to the Iturungal. It was located in the area between Kisurra and Adab.

An Ur III tablet from Umma about an accused grave robber states "Lugal-me’a, the [...], declared: 'Šarabansag, who dug up the grave, at the bank of the Iturungal, in his house (A-nini’s?), he [...]'".

Isin ruler Sîn-māgir (c. 1827–1817 BC) had a year name "(Sîn-māgir) built on the bank of the Iturungal canal (the old wadi) a great fortification (called) Sîn-māgir-madana-dagal-dagal (Sîn-māgir broadens his country)."

The ruler Isin Ur-du-kuga (c. 1830–1828 BC) is known (Cone IM 95461 found at Isin) to have built a cultic center of the god Lulal at Du_{6}-eden-na (Dul-edena) which lay on the Iturungal canal.

An-am (18th century BC), an Old Babylonian period ruler of Uruk recorded building a temple for the goddess Kanisurra, who was called the "mistress of the Iturungal".

It has been suggested that Babylon ruler Sin-Muballit (c. 1811–1793 BC) damned or diverted the Iturungal to defeat the city of Isin.

In the Sumerian literary composition Enkimdu and Dumuzi it states "Let them eat grain in the šuba (stones) fields of Unug, Let your goatlings and lambs drink water from my Iturungal canal".

In one text of the Sumerian literary composition Descent of Inanna into the Underworld Inanna "takes from Uruk to the Netherworld, following the Iturungal Canal upstream and passing the cities of Bad Tibira, Zabalam, Adad, Nippur, Kis, and finally Akkad, where she enters the Netherworld without crossing over the Hubur River".

== See also ==
- Cities of the ancient Near East
