= Ur-du-kuga =

King of Isin
- Reign: c. 1829 - c. 1825 BC
- Predecessor: Iter-pisha
- Successor: Suen-magir
- Died: c. 1825 BC
- Dynasty: 1st Dynasty of Isin

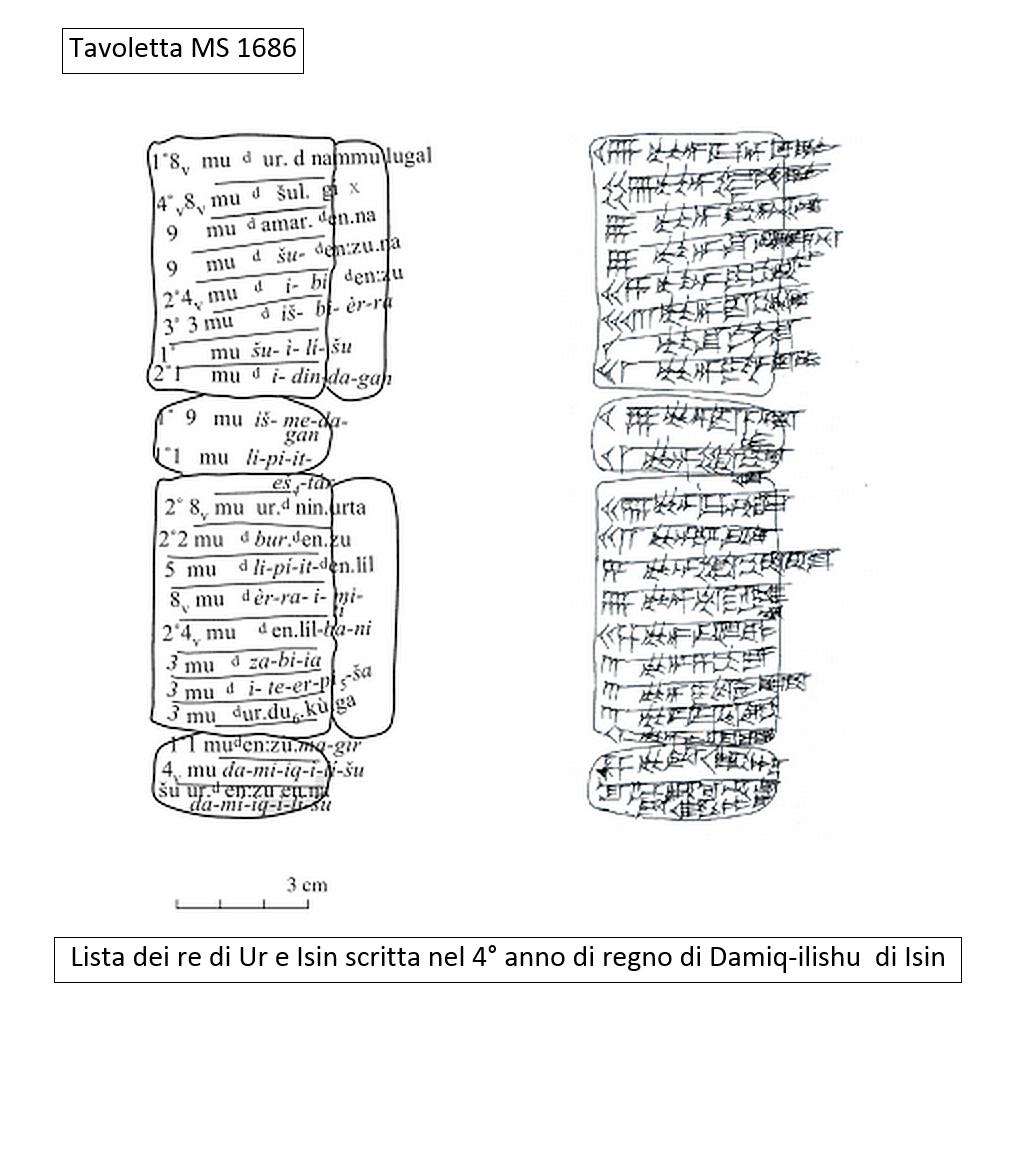

Ur-du-kuga, written ^{d}ur-du_{6}-kù-ga (died c. 1825 BC) was the 13th king of the Dynasty of Isin and reigned for 4 years according to the Sumerian King List, (Note: Sumerian King List, Ashm. 1923.344 the Blund-Wendell prism.) or 3 years according to the Ur-Isin kinglist. (Note: Ur-Isin kinglist, tablet MS 1686 line 18.) He was the third in a sequence of short reigning monarchs whose filiation was unknown and whose power extended over a small region encompassing little more than the city of Isin and its neighbor Nippur. He was probably a contemporary of Warad-Sin of Larsa and Apil-Sin of Babylon.

== Biography ==
He credited Dagon, a god from the middle Euphrates region who had possibly been introduced by the dynasty’s founder, Ishbi-Erra, with his creation, in cones (Note: Cones LB 990, NBC 6110, 6111, 6112.) commemorating the construction of the deity’s temple, the Etuškigara, or the house “well founded residence,” an event also celebrated in a year-name. The inscription describes him as the “shepherd who brings everything for Nippur, the supreme farmer of the gods An and Enlil, provider of the Ekur…” This heaps profuse declarations of his care for Nippur’s sanctuaries, the Ekur for Enlil, the Ešumeša for Ninurta and the Egalmaḫ for Gula, Ninurta’s divine wife.

A piece of brick from Isin, (Note: Brick IB 1337.) bears his titulary but the event it marked has not been preserved. A cone shaft (Note: Cone IM 95461, found in Isin.) memorializes the building of a temple of Lulal of the cultic city of Dul-edena, northeast of Nippur on the Iturungal canal. The digging of the Imgur-Ninisin canal was celebrated in another year-name.

== See also ==
- Chronology of the ancient Near East
- List of Mesopotamian dynasties
