= Damiq-ilishu =

King of Isin
- Reign: c. 1814 - c. 1792 BC
- Predecessor: Suen-magir
- Successor: Position abolished
- Died: c. 1792 BC
- Dynasty: 1st Dynasty of Isin
- Father: Suen-magir

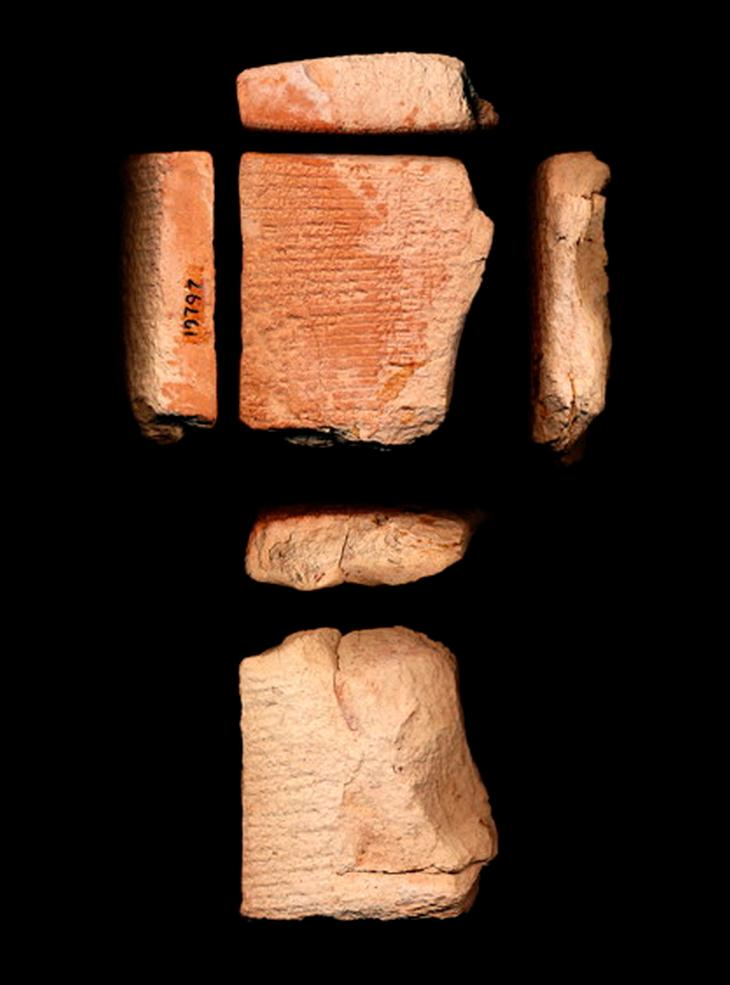
Cuneiform tablet CBS 19797

'Damiq-ilīšu, (Akkadian: 𒁕𒈪𒅅𒉌𒉌𒋗, da-mi-iq-i₃-li₂-šu; died c. 1792 BC) was the 15th and final king of Isin. He succeeded his father Suen-magir and reigned for 23 years. (Note: CBS 19797, published as Hilprecht's BE 20 no. 47 (1906).) Some variant king lists provide a shorter reign, (Note: The Ur-Isin king list, MS 1686 gives 4 years.) but it is thought that these were under preparation during his rule. (Note: Ash. 1923.444 does not list him.) He was defeated first by Sin-Muballit of Babylon and then later by Rim-Sîn I of Larsa.

== Biography ==
His standard inscription characterizes him as the "farmer who piles up the produce (of the land) in granaries." Four royal inscriptions are extant including cones celebrating the building of the wall of Isin, naming him as "Damiq-ilišu is the favorite of the god Ninurta" also recollected in a year-name and "suitable for the office of en priest befitting the goddess Inanna." (Note: HS 2008 & CBS 9999 (Nippur), IB 1090 (Isin).) Construction of a storehouse e-me-sikil, "house with pure mes (rites?)", for the god Mardu, (Note: Cone A7556.) son of the god An. A cone records the construction of a temple, the é-ki-tuš-bi-du_{10}, "House – its residence is good," possibly for the deity Nergal of Uṣarpara. There is also a palace inscription and a copy of a dedication to Nergal of Apiak on a votive lion sculpture.

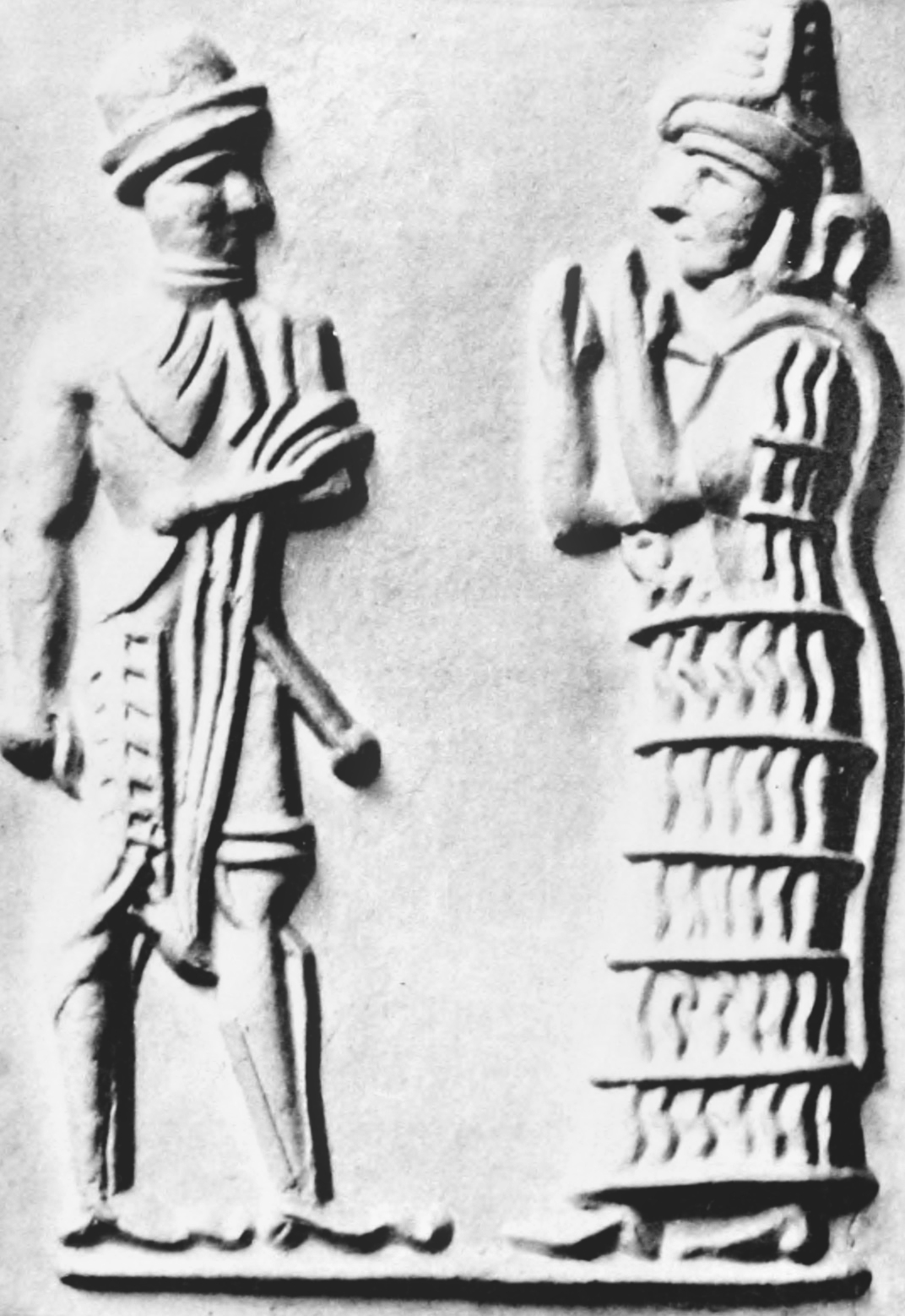
Seal of Dakiya, son of Damiq-ilishu, as a high official of Samsu-iluna, after the loss of his father's kingdom

An outline of the political events can be gleaned from an examination of the year names of the rival kingdoms. Rim-Sîn's year 14 (c. 1744 BC) records "Year the armies of Uruk, Isin, Babylon, Sutum, Rapiqum, and of Irdanene, (Note: Alternative reading of the name: Irnene.) the king of Uruk, were smitten with weapons." This victory over a grand coalition seems to have awakened in Rīm-Sîn imperial ambitions. Damiq-ilišu's year 13 (c. 1803 BC) records the "Year in which (Damiq-ilišu) built the great city wall of Isin (called) 'Damiq-ilišu-hegal' (Damiq-ilišu is abundance)". The holy city of Nippur seems to have been wrestled from the control of Larsa around 1813 BC by Damiq-ilīšu who held it until Rīm-Sîn reclaimed it around 1737 BC, the year he "destroyed Uruk," based upon the dating of documents found there. Sin-muballit's year 13 (c. 1799 BC) is called "Year the troops and the army of Larsa were smitten by weapons." Rim-Sîn's year 25 (c. 1797 BC) is named "Year the righteous shepherd Rim-Sin with the powerful help of An, Enlil, and Enki seized the city of Damiq-ilišu, brought its inhabitants who had helped Isin as prisoners to Larsa, and established his triumph greater than before." This setback seems to have crippled the tottering Isin state enabling Sin-muballiṭ of Babylon to pillage the city around 1796 BC, during his year 16. (Note: Year 16 of Sîn-muballiṭ as recorded at CDLI, Fitzgerald says year 17.)

Rim-Sîn's year 29 (c. 1793 BC) recalls "Year in which Rīm-Sîn the righteous shepherd with the help of the mighty strength of An, Enlil, and Enki seized in one day Dunnum the largest city of Isin and submitted to his orders all the drafted soldiers but he did not remove the population from its dwelling place." His year 30 (c. 1792 BC) reads "Year Rīm-Sîn the true shepherd with the strong weapon of An, Enlil, and Enki seized Isin, the royal capital and the various villages, but spared the life of its inhabitants, and made great for ever the fame of his kingship." The event was considered so significant that from then on every year-name of Rīm-Sîn was named after it: the first year after the sack of Isin until "Year 31 after he seized Isin."

The Weidner Chronicle, (Note: Weidner Chronicle (ABC 19).) also called the Esagila Chronicle, is an apocryphal historiographical or supposititious letter composed in the name of Damiq-ilišu who addresses Apil-Sin of Babylon discussing the merits of offerings made to Marduk on their donors. There is also a belle letter from Damiq-ilīšu to the god Nuska. He seems to have become something of a folk-hero, because later kings hark back to him and describe themselves as his successor. The Sealand Dynasty seems to have considered itself the inheritor of the neo-Sumerian beacon and the 3rd king, Damqi-ilišu, even took his name. The founder of the 2nd Sealand Dynasty, Simbar-shipak, was described as "soldier of the dynasty of Damiq-ilišu," in a historical chronicle. (Note: Dynastic Chronicle (ABC 18) v 3.)

== See also ==
- Chronology of the ancient Near East
- List of Mesopotamian dynasties
