= Zabala (Sumer) =

City with Inanna as deity

Zabala 𒍝𒈽𒀕𒆠
- Tell el-Buzekh
- Location within Iraq
- 31°44′36″N 45°52′36″E
- Type: Settlement
- Periods: Jemdet Nasr, Early Dynastic, Sargonic, Ur III, Isin-Larsa
- Location: Dhi Qar Province, Iraq
- Region: Mesopotamia

Site notes
- Excavation dates: 2001, 2002
- Archaeologists: Haider Al-Subaihawi

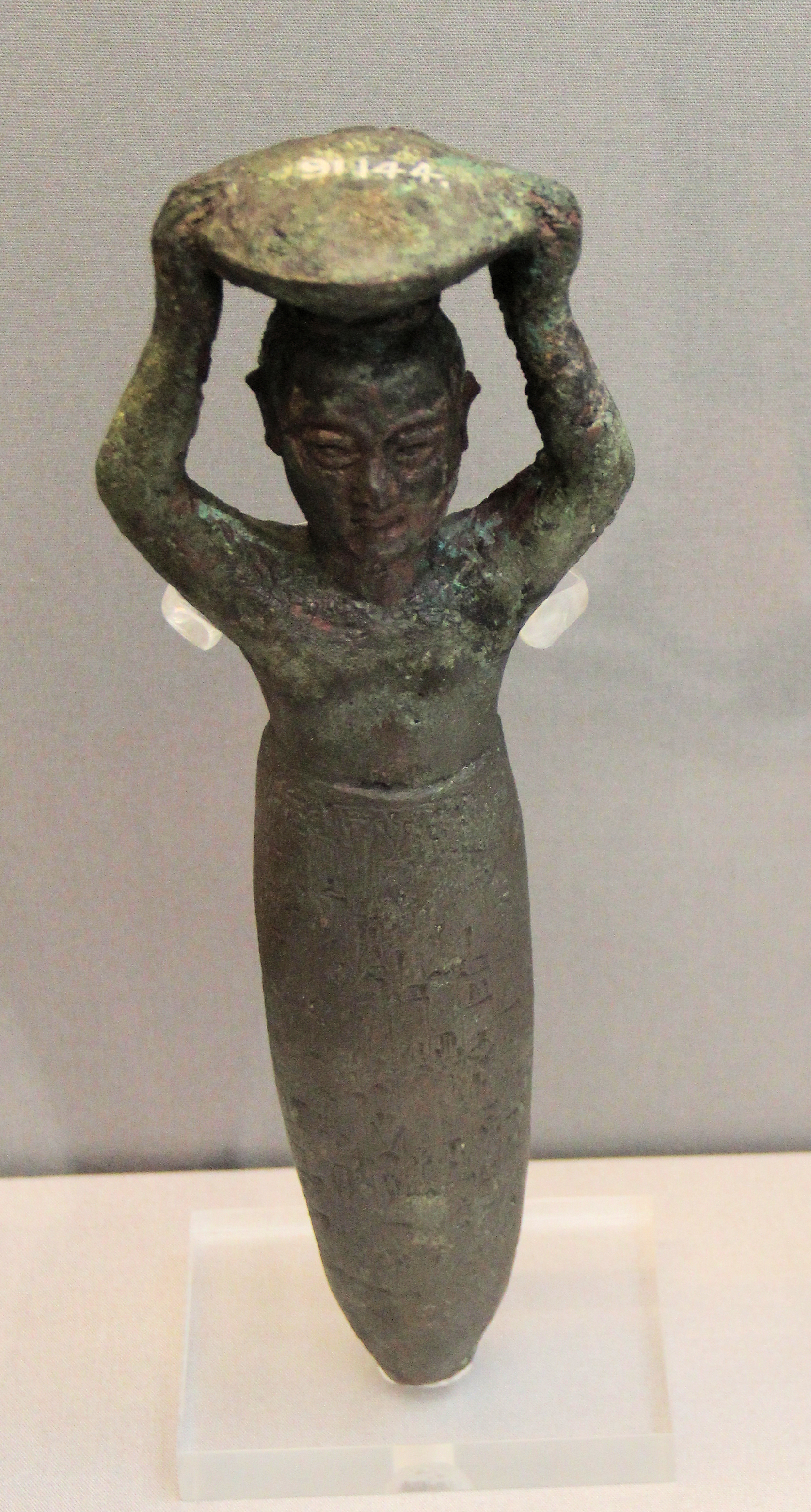
Foundation figurine of Warad-Sin for Inanna, found at Zabalam.

Zabala, also Zabalam (𒍝𒈽𒀕𒆠 zabalam^{ki}, Sumerian - MUŠ_{3}.UNU^{ki}, modern Tell Ibzeikh (also Tell el-Buzekh or Tell Ibzaykh), Dhi Qar Governorate, Iraq) was a city of ancient Sumer in Mesopotamia, located in what is now the Dhi Qar governorate in Iraq. In early archaeology this location was also called Tel el-Buzekh. Locally it is called Tell Bzikh. Zabala was at the crossing of the ancient Iturungal and Ninagina canals, 10 kilometers to the northwest of Umma. The city's deity was Inanna of Zabala. A cuneiform tablet from Zabala contains one of only a few metro-mathematical tables of area measures from the Early Dynastic Period.

== History ==
The first mentions of Zabala are in seals from the Jemdet Nasr period including a list of early sites - Ur, Nippur, Larsa, Uruk, Kes, and Zabalam. The earliest historical record, a bowl inscription, indicates that Zabala was under the control of Lugalzagesi of Umma. This is further supported by tablets from that period. The city is also known to have been under the control of Me'annedu, father of Lugalzagesi.

=== Akkadian Period ===
In the Sargonic Period, Rimush of Akkad reports Zabala as attempting to rebel against the control of the Akkadian Empire:

"Rimuš, king of the world, in battle over Adab and Zabalam was victorious, and 15,718 men he struck down, and 14,576 captives he took. Further, Meskigala, governor of Adab, he captured, and Lugalgalzu, governor of Zabalam, he captured. Their cities he conquered, and their walls he destroyed. Further, from their two cities many men he expelled, and to annihilation he consigned them"

— Adab and Zabalam Inscription of Rimus.

Shar-kali-sharri and Naram-Sin both reported building a temple to the goddess Inanna in Zabala.

=== Post-Akkadian Period ===
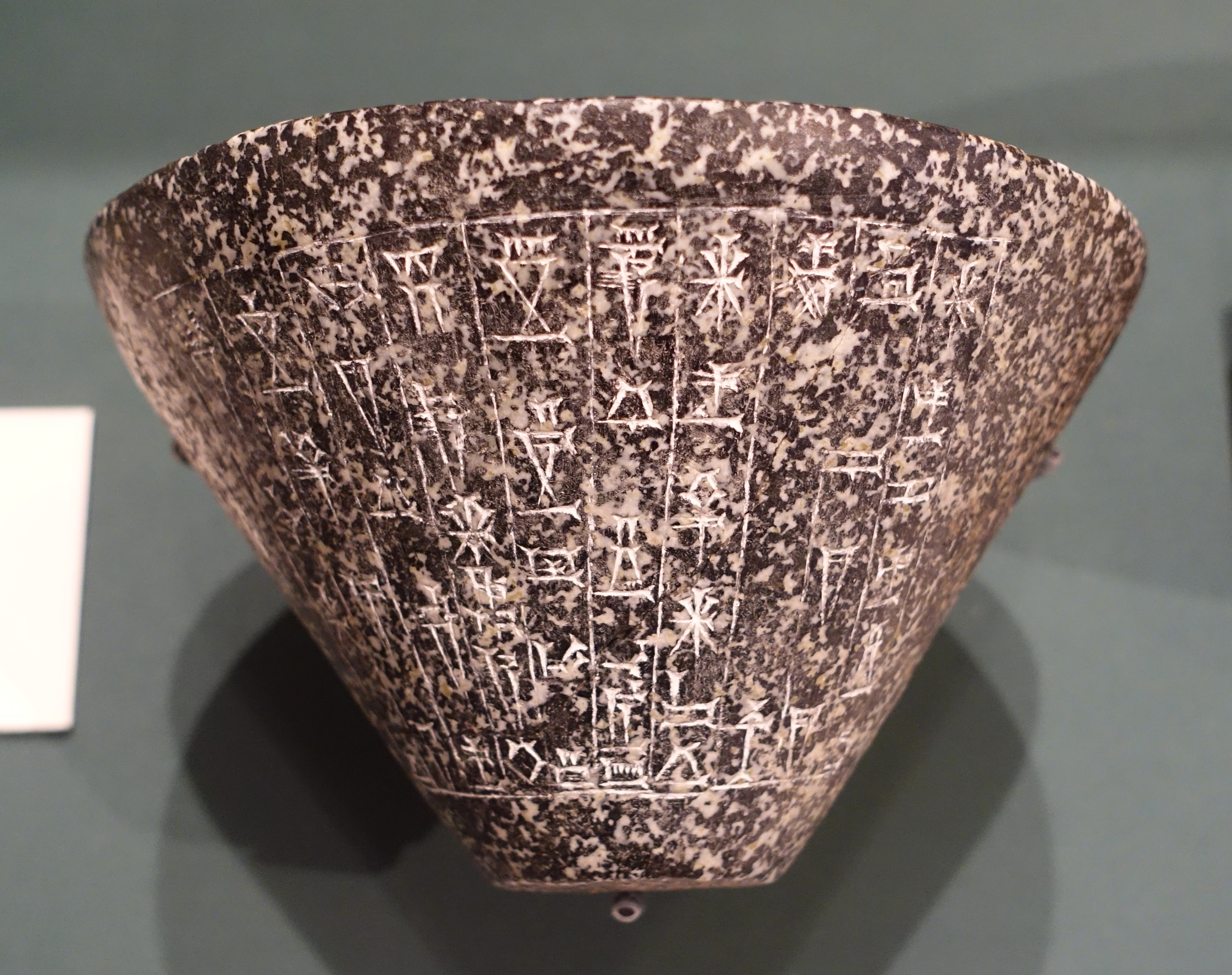
Stone bowl dedicated to Innana of Zabala, 1822-1763 BC - Oriental Institute Museum

After the fall of Akkad, Zabala came into the sphere of the city-state of Isin as reported by the year names of several rulers including Itar-pisa and Ur-Ninurta. The town was later subject to Abisare of Larsa, whose year name reported the building of the "Favorite of Inanna of Zabalam" canal.

=== Ur III Period ===
During the Ur III period, Zabala was controlled by the Ur governor in Umma which was the capital of Umma Province.

=== Babylonian Period ===
Cuneiform texts state that Hammurabi built Zabala's temple Ezi-Kalam-ma (House of the Life of the Land) to the goddess Inanna. The temple of Inanna in Zabalam is the subject of hymn 26 from a collection known as Temple Hymns, traditionally attributed to Enheduanna.

== Archaeology ==
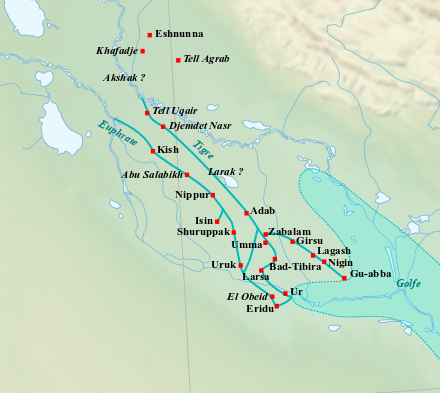
Basse Mesopotamie DA

The roughly rectangular site, which covers an areas of about 61 hectares, was first identified during the South Mesopotamian Mound Survey in 1954. It consists of three main mounds, east, west, and south. It is surrounded by a wall which was "built of brick and clay with plaster material, and is decorated with buttresses and recesses". Beginning in the early 1900s, a great deal of illegal excavation occurred in Zabala. An example of writing from the time of Hammurabi was removed from Zabala during this period. This activity reached a new height in the 1990s, at which time the Iraqi State Organization of Antiquities and Heritage authorized an official excavation, the first at the site. Two seasons of excavation, in 2001 and 2002, occurred under the direction of Haider Al-Subaihawi. Several public and religious buildings were uncovered, a number of cuneiform tablets and an inscribed stone foundation cylinder of Warad-Sin, king of Larsa were found. A bronze sculpture (canephor, which is a form of Caryatid ), from Warad-Sin which mentions his father Kudur-Mabuk was also found. A number of Old Babylonian period cylinder seals were also found. A further outbreak of archaeological looting at Zabala broke out after the 2003 War in Iraq.

== See also ==
- Cities of the ancient Near East
