= William Loftus (archaeologist) =

English archaeologist (1820–1858)

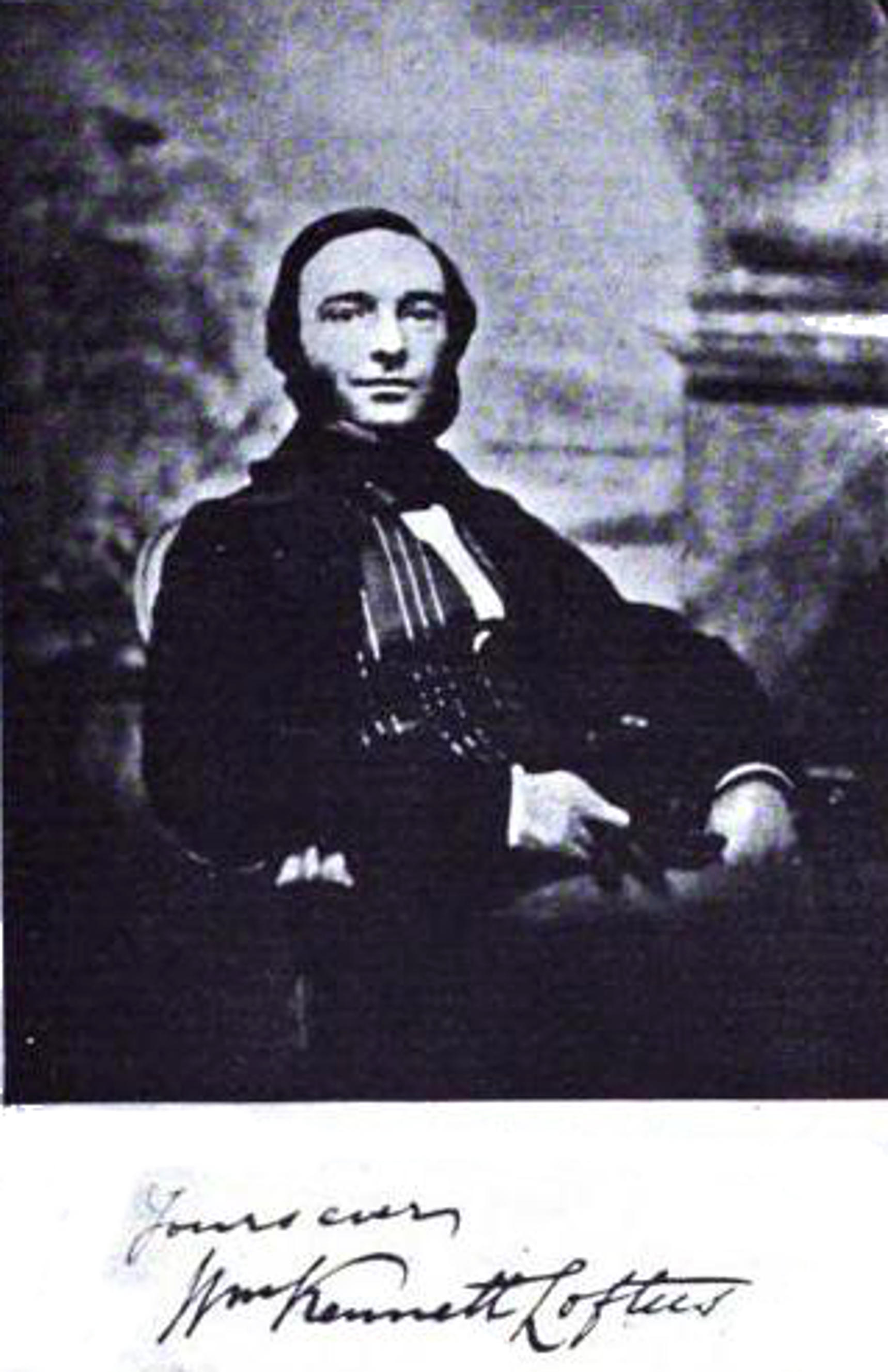
William Loftus

William Kennett Loftus (13 November 1820, in Linton, Kent – 27 November 1858, at sea) was a British geologist, naturalist, explorer and archaeological excavator. He discovered the ancient Sumerian city of Uruk in 1849.

== Biography ==
Loftus was brought up in Rye, East Sussex, and went to school at Newcastle Royal Grammar School. In Cambridge, where from 1840 he studied geology, he was a student at Caius College. In 1845 he married Charlotte Thulbourne. From 1849 he served as geologist and naturalist with the British government's Turco-Persian Boundary Commission, under Colonel Fenwick Williams (Royal Artillery). The work of the mission gave Loftus and his friend Henry Adrian Churchill the chance to visit ancient sites and, in 1850, to excavate for a month at Uruk (Warka) and Larsa (Senkereh), discovering the Ziggurat of Ur. Loftus and Churchill also visited Susa in 1850, but they only made plans of the site, and Percy Sykes described the pair's reception at Susa as "unfriendly".

Briefly, in February to April 1851, Loftus was released from the work of the commission to excavate at Susa on behalf of the British Museum, but was in June replaced by Hormuzd Rassam, together with whom Loftus subsequently explored the sites and collaborated on a report on the work at Susa. He is credited with the discovery of the Apadana, later excavated by the French amateur archaeologist Marcel-Auguste Dieulafoy.

Engaged in 1853 by the newly founded Assyrian Excavation Fund to conduct excavations in Warka, Loftus worked at the site from January to April 1854, uncovering the famous coloured clay cone wall and some tablets written in cuneiform script. In October of the same year he transferred to Nineveh, and also worked at Nimrud, where in February 1855 he found the so-called "Burnt Palace" of the Assyrian king Assurnasirpal II and a hoard of exquisite ivories. In 1854 he briefly excavated at Tell Sifr.

In September 1856 Loftus was engaged as assistant geologist to the Geological Survey of India, but in India he suffered declining health and died at sea on the voyage back to Britain, aged 38.

== Works ==
- Travels and Researches in Chaldaea and Susiana in 1849-52 (1857)
- Reports of the Assyrian Excavation Fund I and II, published in R.D. Barnett, Sculptures from the North Palace of Ashurbanipal at Nineveh (668-627 B.C.) (1976)
