= Warad-Sin =

King of Larsa

Warad-Sin 𒀴𒀭𒂗𒍪

King of Larsa
- Reign: c. 1834-1823 BC (MC)
- Predecessor: Silli-Adad
- Successor: Rim-Sin I
- Died: c. 1823 BC
- Father: Kudur-Mabuk

Location of Larsa

Warad-Sin (𒀴𒀭𒂗𒍪, ARAD-^{D}suen; died c. 1823 BC) ruled the ancient Near East city-state of Larsa. His royal titulary included "governor of Ur", "governor of Lagash, and governor of the "land of Kutalla". At the beginning of his reign the kingdom of Larsa was partly occupied by Kazallu and. Larsa under Warad-Sin and Babylon acted together to destroy Kazallu. His father Kudur-Mabuk powerful figure in Larsa. His sister En-ane-du became en-priestess of the moon god Nanna in Ur in the 7th or 8th year of his reign. She continued in that role until at least the 29th year of his successor Rim-Sin I. He was a contemporary of Isin rulers Iter-pisa, Ur-du-kuga, and Sîn-magir. It is also known that Warad-Sîn of Larsa and Sîn-iribam of Uruk were contemporaries from a Warad-Sîn year 4 text that contains oaths by both kings. It has been suggested that Warad-Sin was the father of later Larsa ruler Rim-Sin II.

All 12 year names of Warad-Sin are known (most of a religious nature), notably:

- Year the city wall of Kazallu was destroyed and the army of Mutibal occupying Larsa was smitten by weapons
- Year in which Enanedu was installed as en-priestess of Nanna in Ur
- Year the great wall of Ur was built
- Year the city (wall) of Al-Šarrākī (Irisaĝrig) was restored
- Year the temple of Nin-ga'uga in Maskan-Sapir was built

For the first half of his reign Warad-Sin referred to his father Kudur-Mabuk af "father of the Amorite land" and in the second half as "father of Emutbala". Like all those in the Nur-Adad dynastic Warad-Sin never refers to himself as an Amorite in any of his inscriptions.

An inscribed stone foundation cylinder of Warad-Sin was found at Zabalam "For the goddess Inana-of-Zabalam, my lady, (I), Warad-Sîn, king of Larsa, for my life and for the life of Kudur-Mabuk, the father who engendered me, built for her the Gigunaku, her martial residence ...". A inscribed bronze canephor was also found "For the goddess Inana-of-Zabala, daughter of the god Sin, my lady, I Warad-Sin, who am king of Larsa, for my life and for the life of Kudur-Mabuk, the father who engendered me, (the goddess Inanna), having never agreed to allow any of my royal ancestors to build (the temple) Gigunaku, (that is) Esagil ...".

Bastion of Warad-Sin at Ur lies at the north-west end of the ziggurat. A foundatiuon cone of Warad-Sin was found in the brickwork. The text mentions his father "... When Namrasit, the god of the new moon, had revealed to me his favorable omen, had directed on me his look of life, had commanded me to build his temple, to restore its place, for my own life, and the life of Kudurmabug, the father who begat me, his house, joy of the heart, E-temennigur, I built for him ...". A clay cone found at the temple of Ningal which read "... the walls and foundation of her 'house Ilurugu of the land,'her beloved 'house', which had been erected in long-gone days, had aged. He (Warad-Sin) did not remove its foundation deposit, but repaired its aged underside ...".

== See also ==
- Chronology of the ancient Near East
- List of Mesopotamian dynasties

== Gallery ==
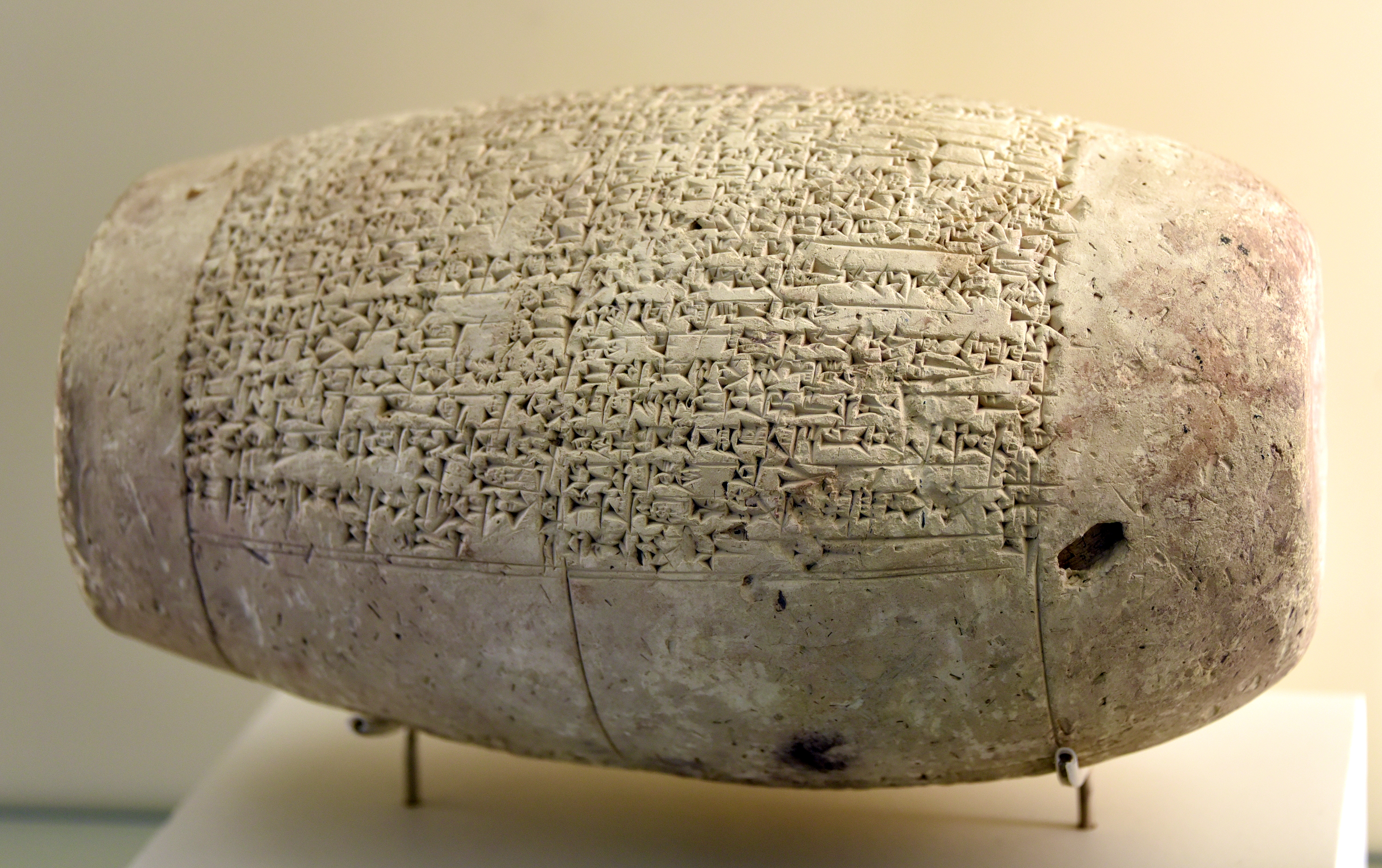
Clay cylinder. The Akkadian cuneiform text mentions the name of Warad-Sin, ruler of Larsa. From Babylon, Iraq. Vorderasiatisches Museum, Berlin.

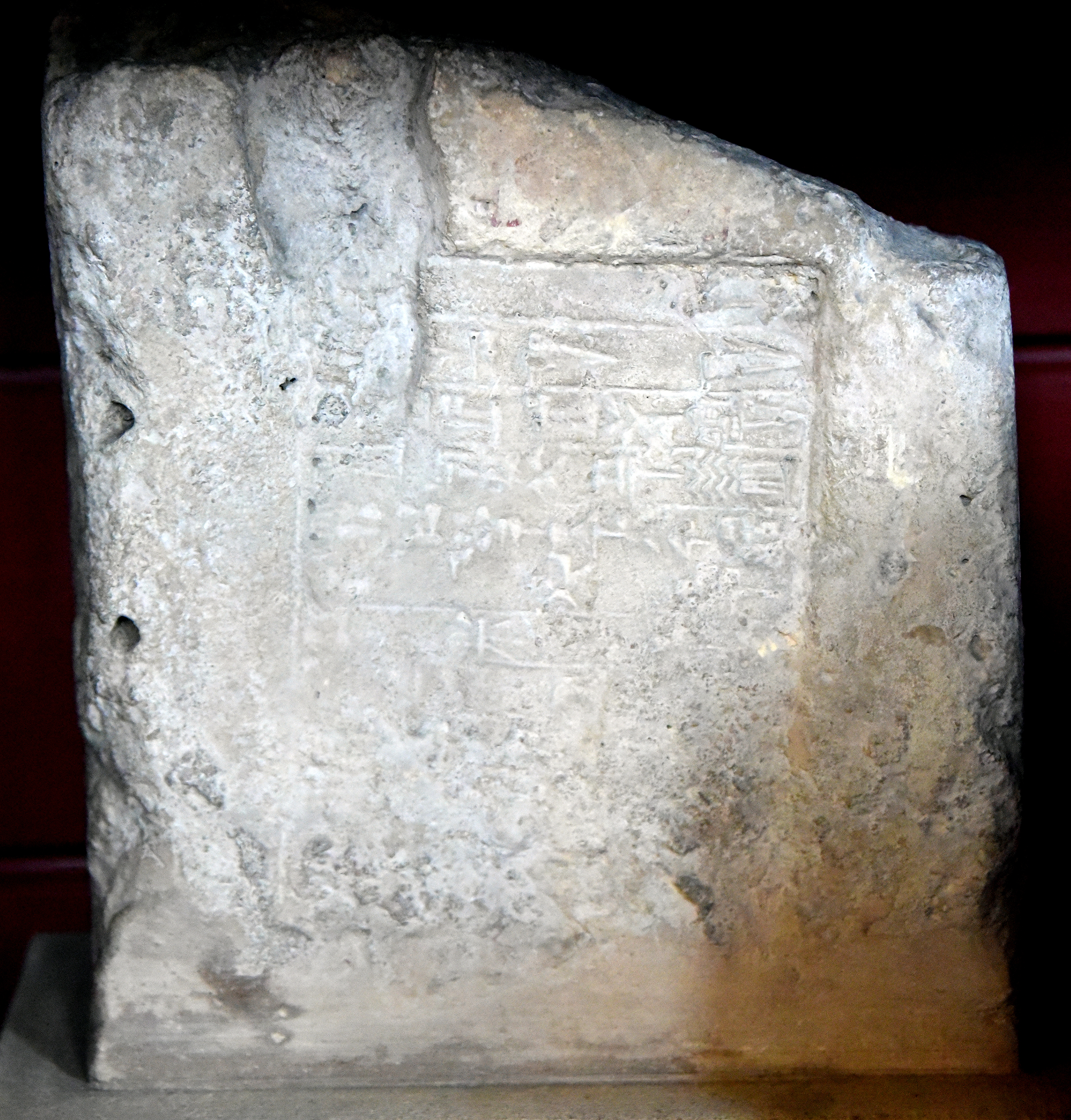
Fired mudbrick, stamped. The Akkadian cuneiform inscription mentions the name of Warad-Sin, ruler of Larsa. From Ur, Iraq. British Museum, London.

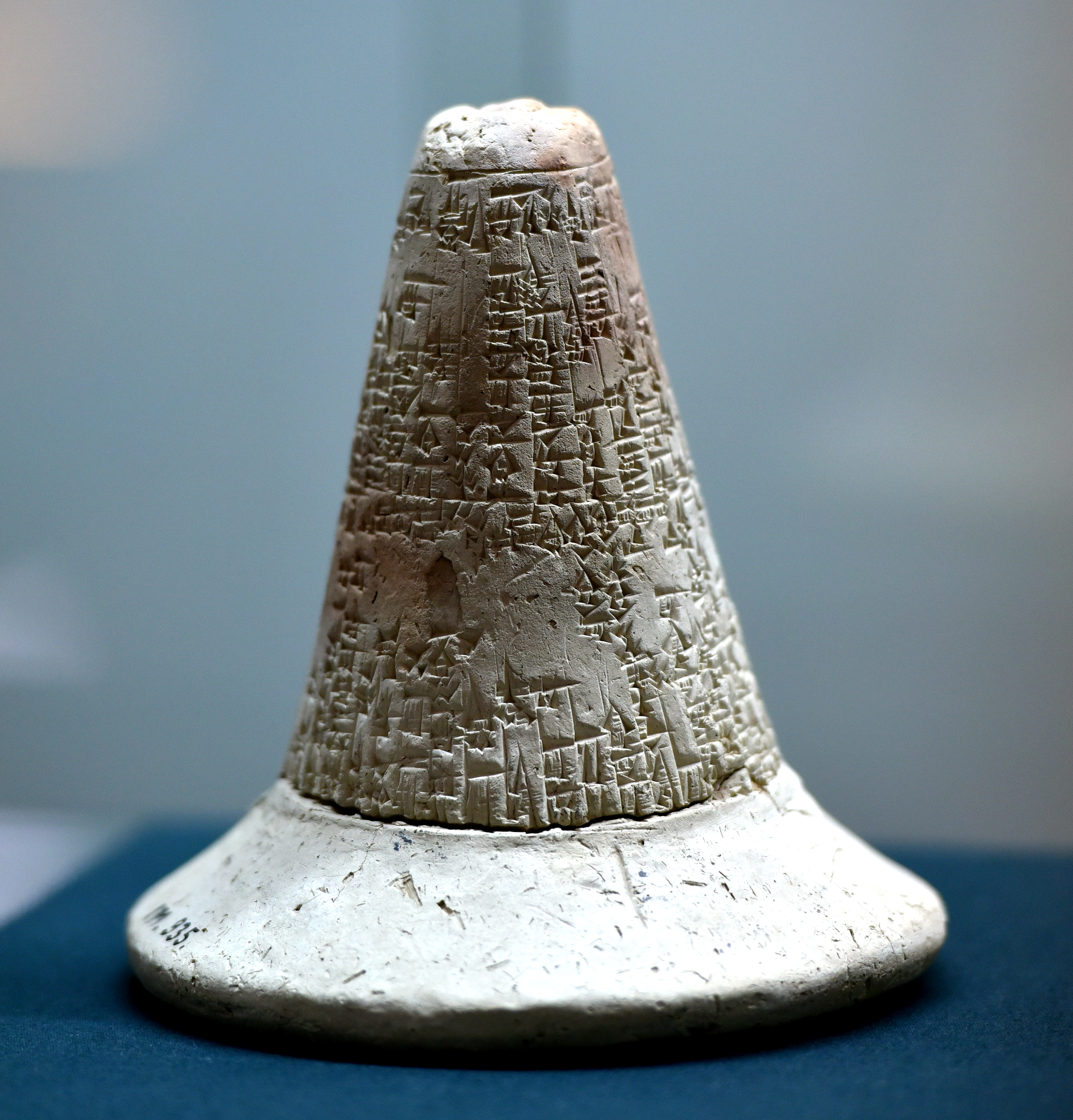
Foundation cone of Warad-Sin, ruler of Larsa, 19th century BC. From Ur, Iraq. Iraq Museum, Baghdad.

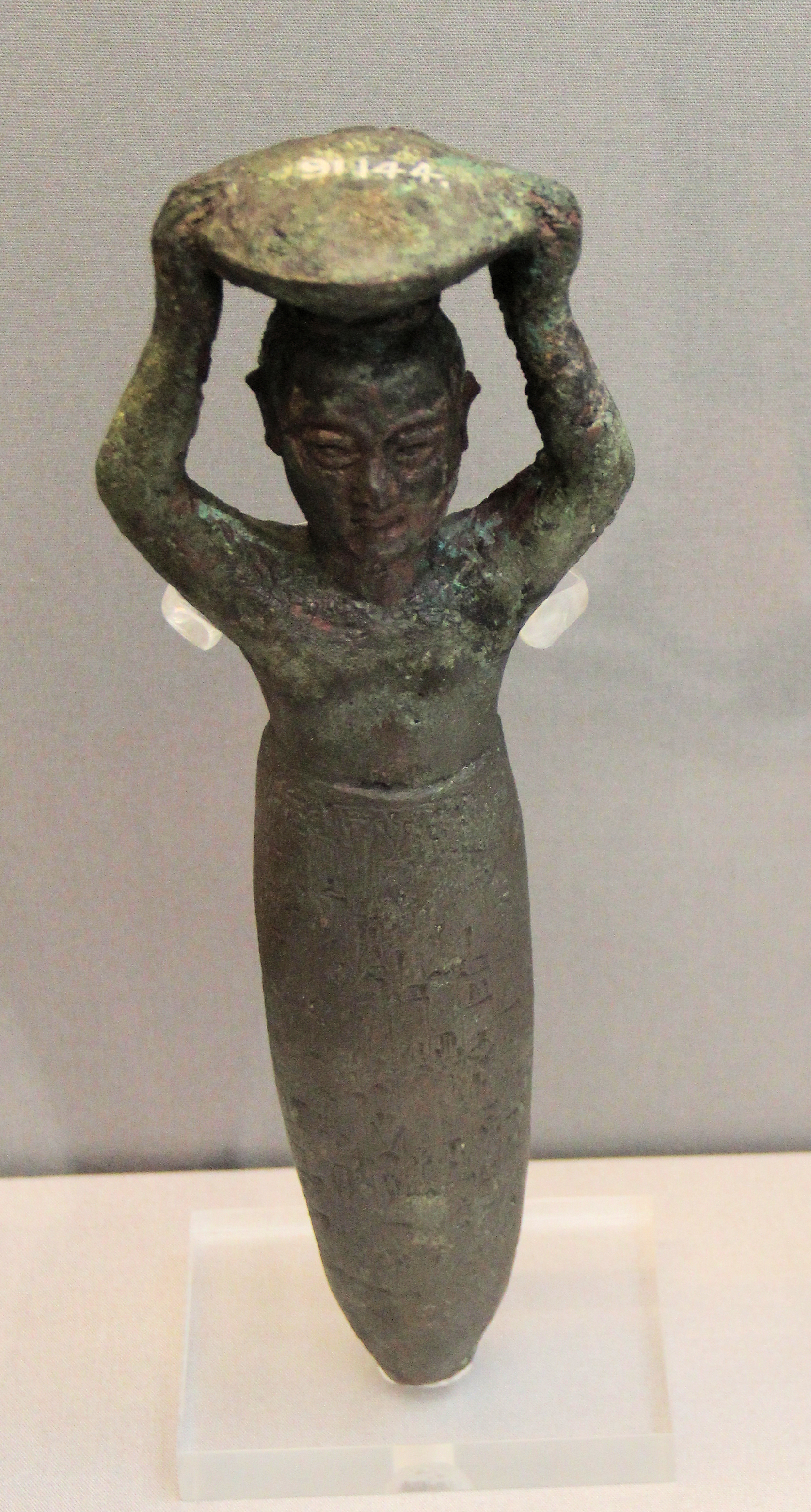
Foundation figurine of Warad-Sin for Inanna at Zabalam
