= Kudur-Mabuk =

High official of Larsa

- 𒆪𒁺𒌨𒈠𒁍𒊌
- Children: Warad-Sin and Rim-Sin I
- Parent: Šimti-šilhak

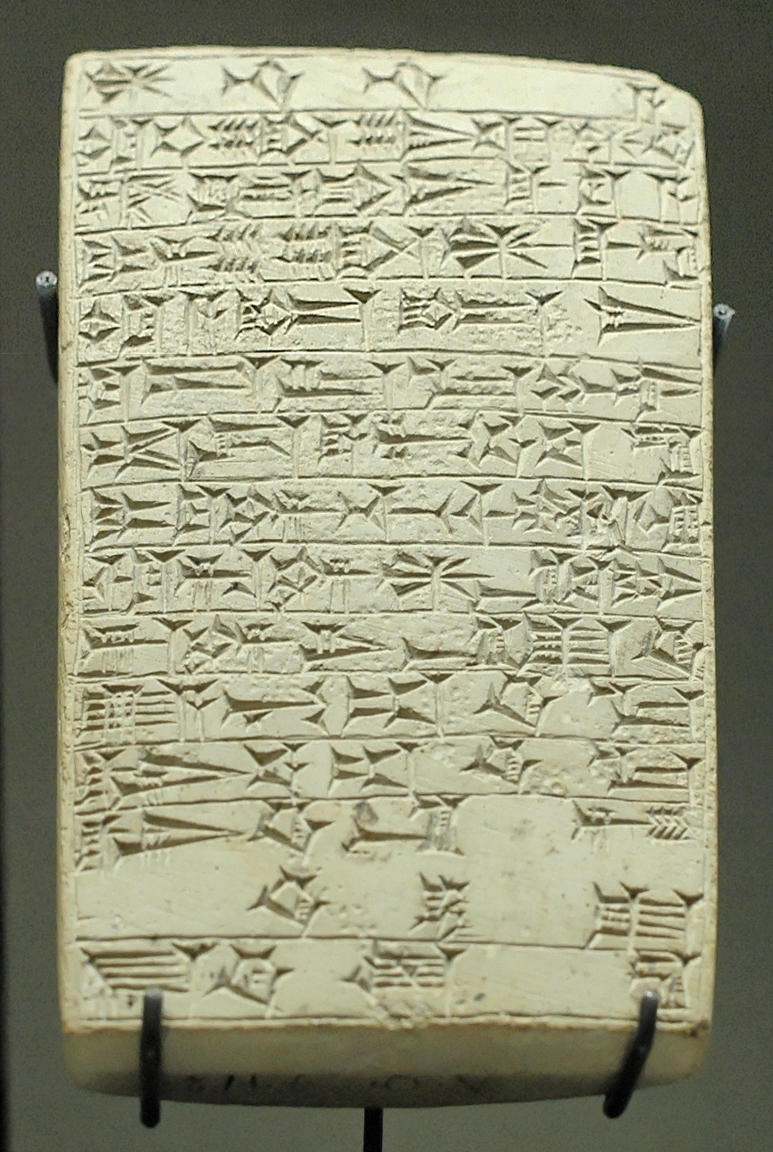
Foundation tablet for the temple of Nanaia, built by Kudur-Mabuk and his son Rim-Sin I, rulers of Larsa. c. 1820 BC. Louvre Museum.

Kudur-Mabuk 𒆪𒁺𒌨𒈠𒁍𒊌; (ku-du-ur-ma-bu-uk) (19th century BC) was a high official in the ancient Near East city-state of Larsa. He first comes to light in the reign of Sin-Iddinam (c. 1849-1843 BC), when he was in Mashkan-shapir, in the Emutbal province of Larsa (annexed by earlier ruler Zabaia) which was in the northern part of the kingdom of Larsa and is not mentioned after the 8th year of Rim-Sin I and presumed to have died at that point. His sons Warad-Sin (c. 1834-1823 BC) and Rim-Sin I (c. 1822-1763 BC) were kings of Larsa. Late in the reign of Warad-Sin he became governor of Emutbal. Though never a ruler he wielded much power in the region with titles like "Father of the Amorite land" (ad.da.kur.mar.tu) and "Father of Emutbala" (ad.da-e-mu-ut-ba-la). He was responsible for the restoration and rebuilding of a number of prominent buildings including the Eeškite shrine for Nanna, the Egabura for Ningubalag, Ekuga for Nergal, Ekituššatenbi for Zababa, and Etilmun for Inana as well as the Nanna-ḫul canal. He also led a number of military campaigns for Larsa, especially during the reign of Rim-Sin I. He restored Maškān-šāpir and Kār-Šamaš to Larsa and have smitten the army of Kazallu and Mutiabal in Larsa (and) Emutbala’ and to have "seized Kazallu, torn down its wall, (and) made it submit".

"Kudur-Mabuk, father of the Amorite land, son of Simti-šilḫak, the one who repaid favor for the Ebabbar (temple), who smote the army of Kazallu and Muti-abal in Larsa (and) Yamutbal, who by decree of the gods Nanna and Utu seized Kazallu, tore down its wall, (and) made it submit – at that time, for the god Nergal, his lord, having (established) partnership (with him), he built Emetegira (“House Suitable for the Mighty One”), his residence of valor, filled with radiance and fearsome splendor, for his own life and for the life of Warad-Sîn, his son, king of Larsa."

Maškān-šāpir was led by Ṣillī-Ištar who Kudur-Maduk called "Enemy of Larsa, evil-doer against Emutbala". A stele, no lost but known from an inscription copy, whosed Kudur-Mabuk smiting Ṣillī-Ištar. There was a Dur-Kudur-Mabuk, "Fortress of Kudur-Mabuk", in the kingdom of Larsa.

He is mentioned in three of his sons year names, Rim-Sin I year 3 - "Year in which (Rim-Sin) brought 4 statues in copper representing Kudur-mabuk into the temple of Nanna and built the temple of Ninmarki in Ashdubba", Rim-Sin I year 5 - "Year (Rim-Sin) brought 2 statues in copper representing Kudur-mabuk and a stele in copper into (the temple) Egalbarra / the outer palace", and Warad-Sin year 9 - "Year (Warad-Sin) brought one golden statue adorned with gold! (representing) Kudur-mabuk into the temple of Shamash". Inscriptions of Warad-Sin also mention dedicating several Balag instruments (used in religious ceremonies) to himself and Kudur-Mabuk.

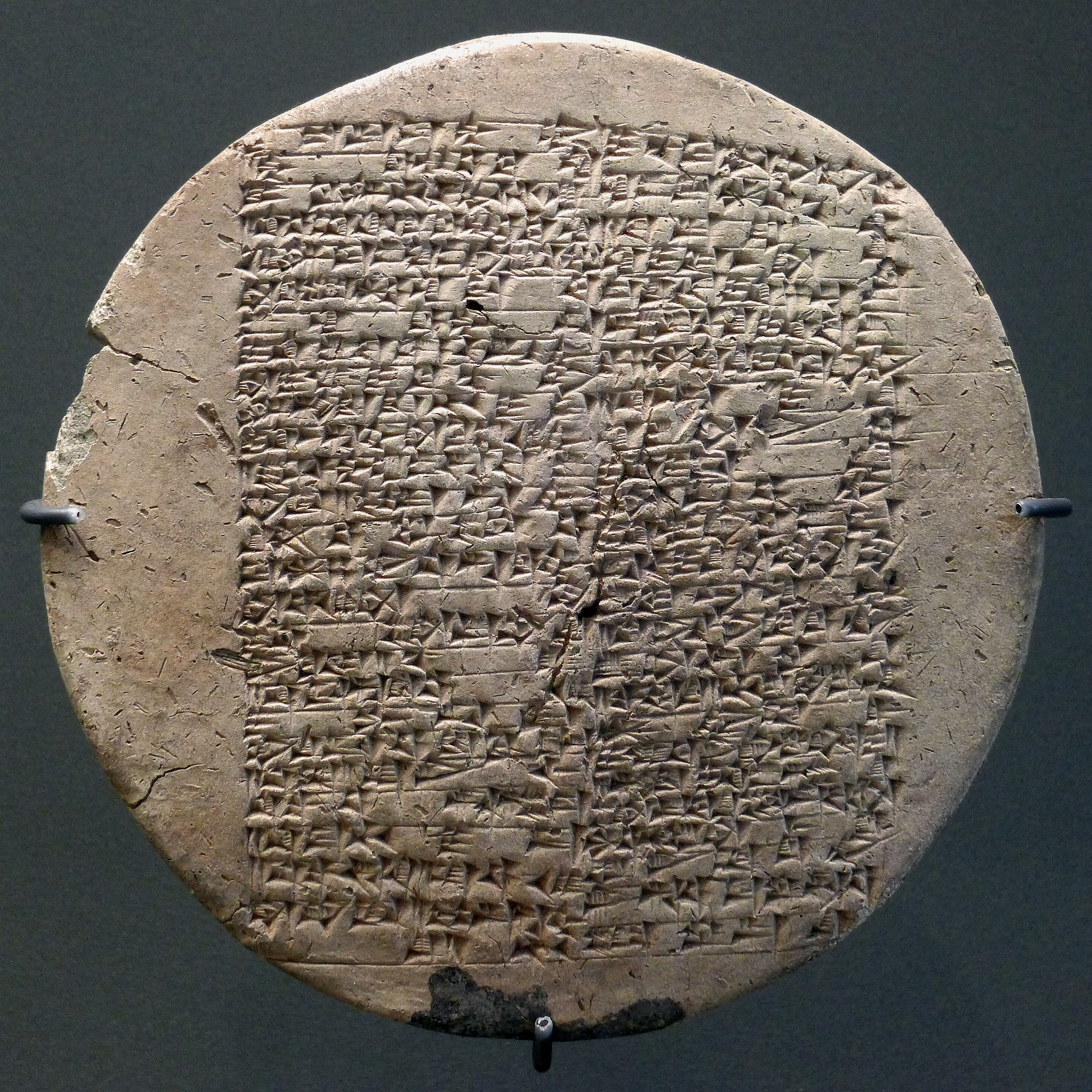
Clay cone inscription of Kudur-Mabuk AO6445 - Louvre Museum

His name was Elamite (meaning "(The god) Mabuk is a protector") as was that of his father Šimti-šilhak and his daughter Manzi-wartaš. Nothing is known about the god Mabuk who is known only from personal names (theonyms). His daughter En-ane-du (possibly Manzi-wartaš it not being uncommon for new en-priestesses to adopt a Sumerian name on ascension) was high priestess of the moon god Nanna in Ur. A stone seal found at Ur read "Enanedu en priestess of the god Nanna of Ur, son of Kudur-mabuk, brother of Warad-Sîn, king of Larsa.". Other inscriptions read "daughter of Kudur-mabuk" and it is not clear why this one reads "son". It has been proposed that Kudur-Mabuk had another son, Sîn-muballiṭ, who is known to have been a governor for Larsa at Maškān-šāpir. He is not, probably, to be confused the ruler of Babylon having the same name, Sîn-muballiṭ. Sîn-muballiṭ was governor of Maškān-šāpir when it was captured by Hammurabi of Babylon.

Nabonidus (556 BC – 539 BC), the last Neo-Babylonian ruler, while rebuilding the Egipar temple of Ninegal in the city of Ur found a text:

"I discovered an old inscription of Enanedu, ēntu-priestess of Ur, daughter of Kudur-Mabuk, sister of Rim-Sîn, king of Ur, who had renewed the Egipar and restored it, and who had surrounded the resting place of the old ēntu-priestesses with a wall up to the edge of the Egipar; and I made the Egipar anew as in the past."

== See also ==
- Chronology of the ancient Near East
- Kings of Larsa
- List of Mesopotamian dynasties
