= Silli-Adad =

King of Larsa

King of Larsa
- Reign: c. 1835 - c. 1834 BC
- Died: c. 1834 BC

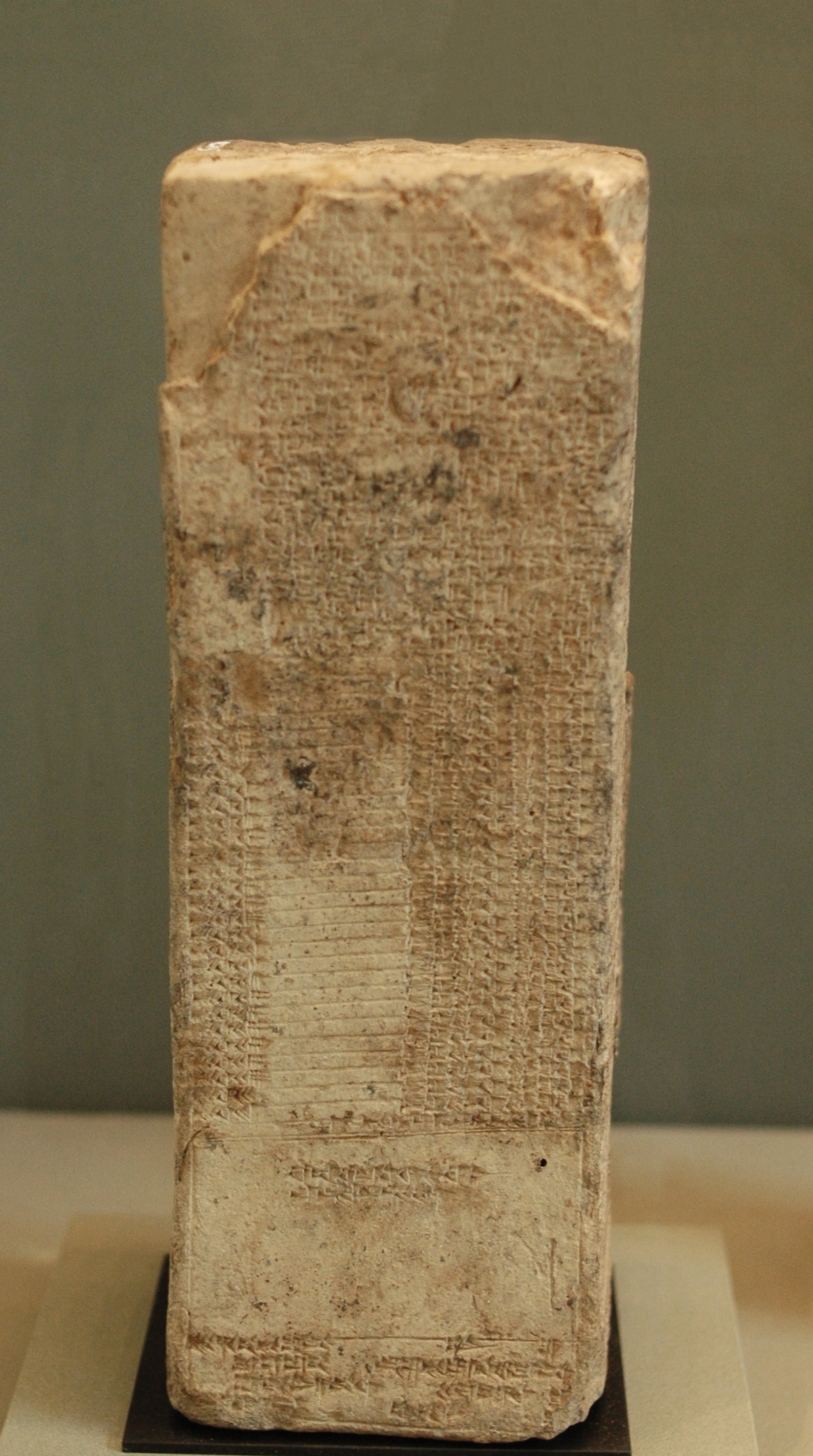
List of the Kings of Larsa, ca. 2025-1762 BCE

Silli-Adad (died c. 1834 BC) ruled the ancient Near East city-state of Larsa from c. 1835 BC to c. 1834 BC (MC). His reign was less than a full year. the annals state that he was "removed from kingship" and "was no longer king". His successor was Warad-Sin.

== See also ==
- Chronology of the ancient Near East
- List of Mesopotamian dynasties
