= Rim-Sîn I =

Rim-Sin
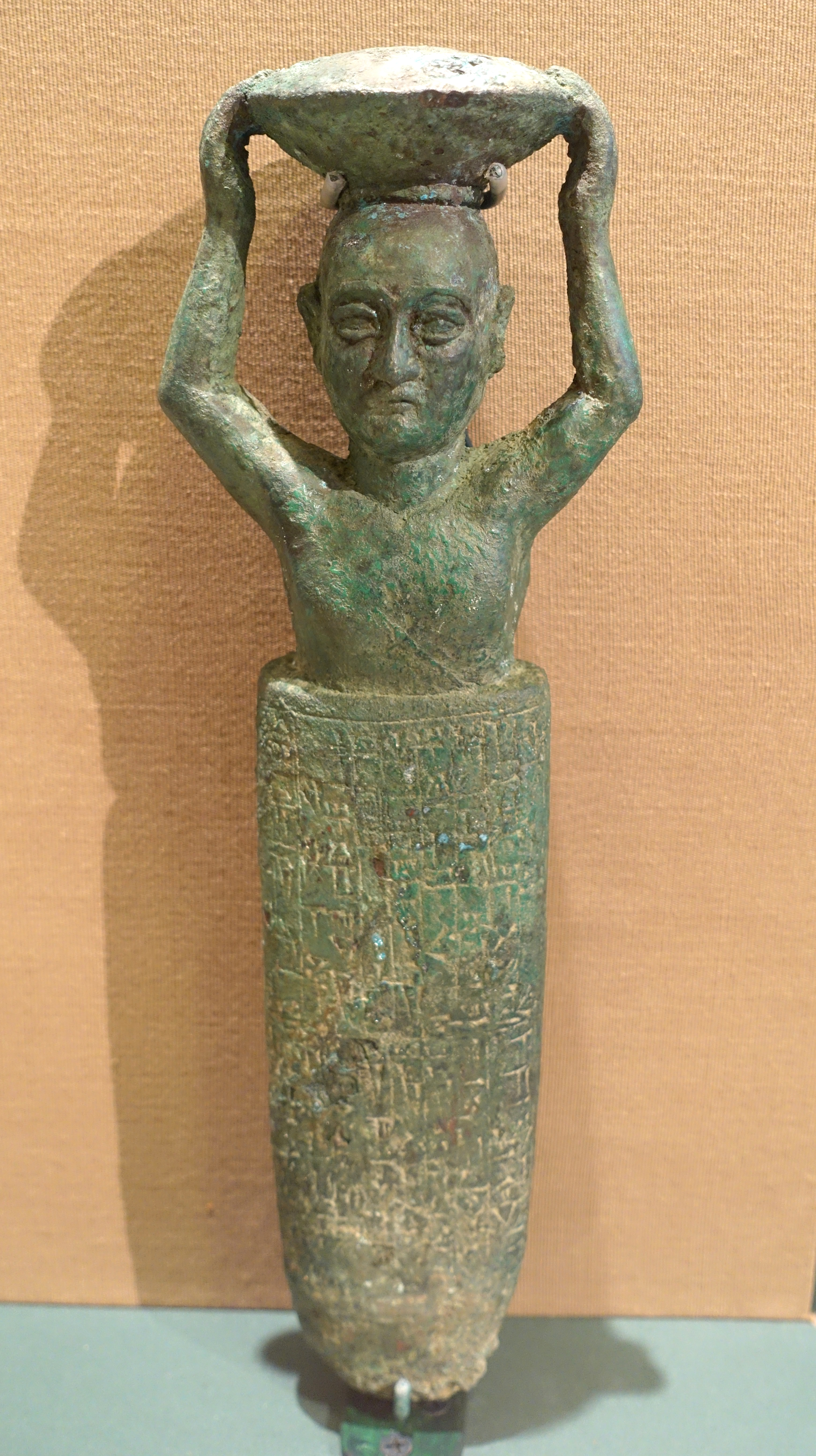
- Rim-Sin foundation figurine, 1822–1763 BC - Oriental Institute Museum, University of Chicago

King of Larsa
- Reign: c. 1823 - c. 1763 BC
- Predecessor: Warad-Sin
- Successor: Position abolished
- Died: c. 1763 BC
- Father: Kudur-Mabuk
- Religion: Sumerian polytheism

Rim-Sîn I (Akkadian: 𒀭𒊑𒅎𒀭𒂗𒍪, ^{D}ri-im-^{D}suen; died c. 1763 BC) ruled the ancient Near East city-state of Larsa from 1823 BC to 1763 BC (MC). His sister En-ane-du was high priestess of the moon god in Ur. Rim-Sin I was a contemporary of Hammurabi of Babylon and Irdanene of Uruk. His father, Kudur-Mabuk, grandfather Šimti-šilhak and his daughter Manzi-wartaš had Elamite names.

== Reign ==
Rim-Sin’s reign of Larsa started sometime around 1823 BC (in middle chronology) when he succeeded his brother, Warad-Sin. He immediately began to expand Larsa by attacking the neighboring city-states of Uruk, Isin, and Babylon. Around 1808 BC, the city was so big that other cities were worried about its growth. The king of Isin, the ruler of Uruk, and the chief of Babylon campaigned against Rim-Sin. He defeated them, then occupied Pi-Naratim (the mouths of the Tigris and Euphrates) around 1807 BC, Zibnatum around 1805 BC, Bit-Susin and Uzarbara around 1804 BC, and Kisarra around 1802 BC. He also destroyed Der in that year. Around 1801 BC he sacked Uruk, sparing its inhabitants. Around 1797 BC, he invaded the territory of Isin, finally seizing the capital around 1792 BC. This conquest was so important to Rim-Sin that every year name of his rule after was named in years after the sack of Isin.

Around 1787 BC, Hammurabi, the king of Babylon, attacked Isin and reports to have conquered it, but this is more likely an exaggeration of a successful raid.

=== Siege of Larsa ===
Around 1764 BC, Hammurabi turned against Rim-Sin, who had refused to support Hammurabi in his war against Elam despite pledging his troops. Hammurabi, with troops from Mari, first attacked Mashkan-shapir on the northern edge of Rim-Sin's realm. Hammurabi's forces quickly reached Larsa, and after a six-month siege the city fell.

== Death ==
Rim-Sin escaped the city of Larsa after its fall but was soon found and taken prisoner and died thereafter.

== See also ==
- Chronology of the ancient Near East
- List of Mesopotamian dynasties
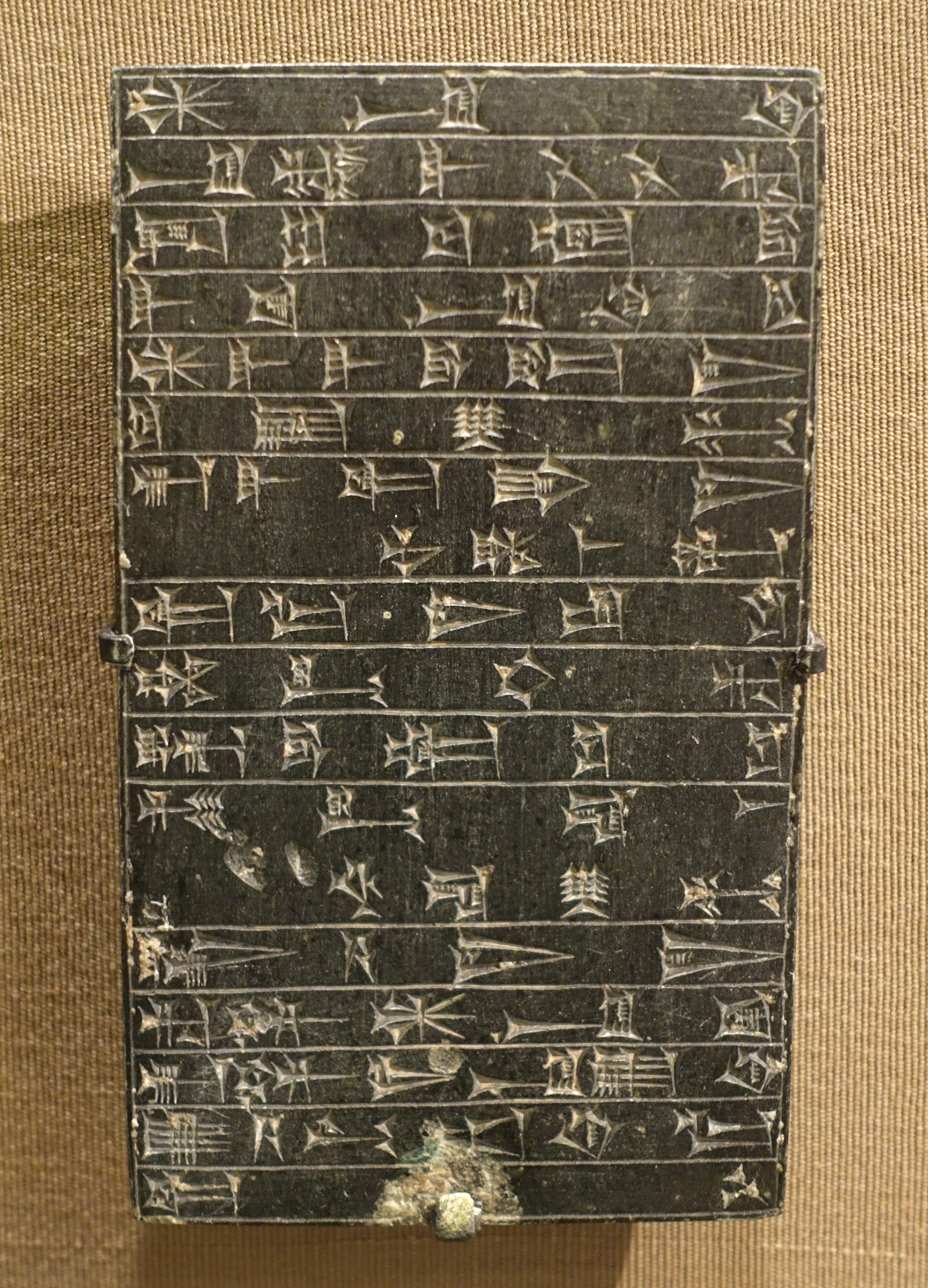
Rim-Sin foundation tablet, 1822–1763 BC - Oriental Institute Museum, University of Chicago

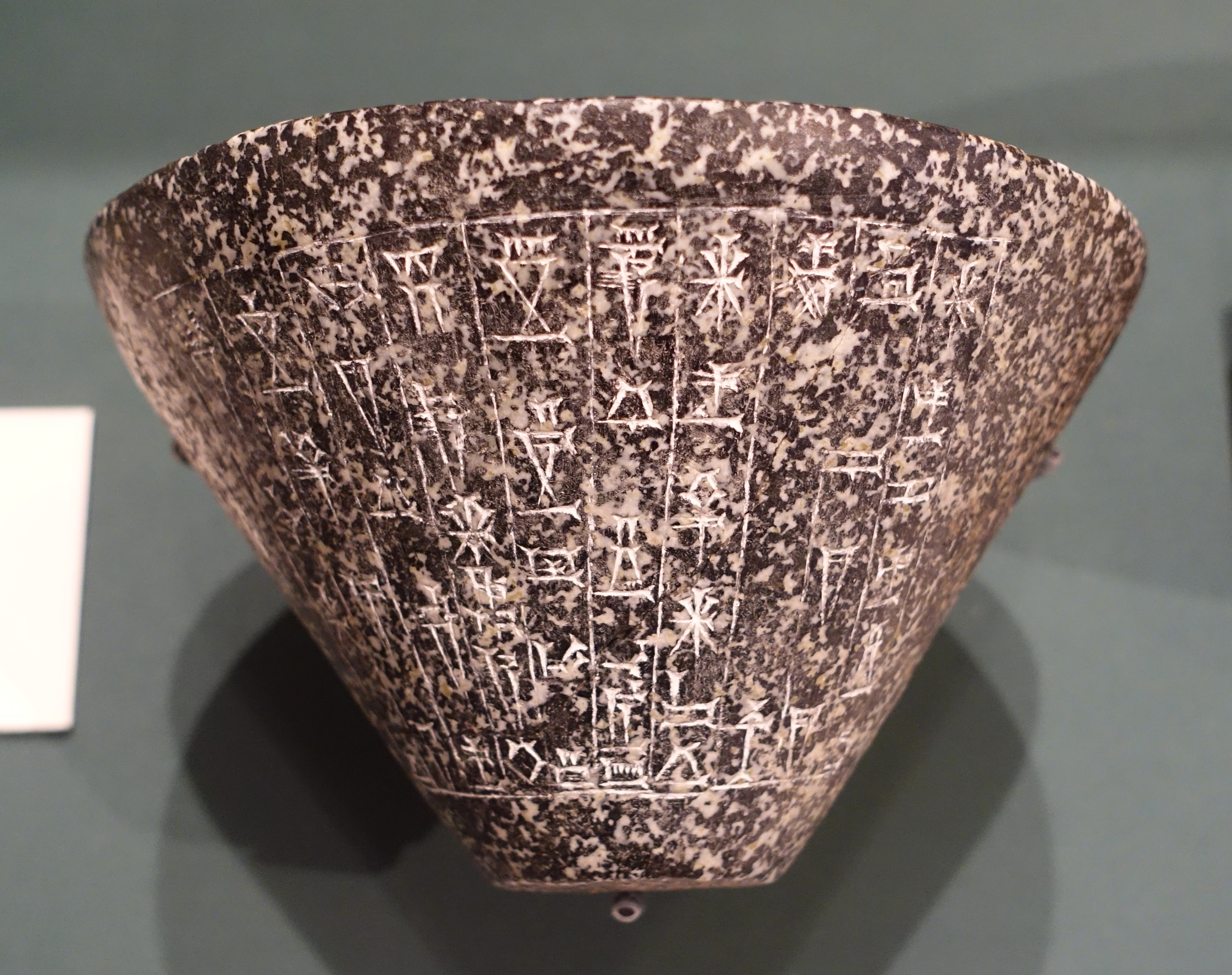
Stone bowl dedicated to Innana of Zabala, in the name of Rim-Sin, 1822–1763 BC - Oriental Institute Museum, University of Chicago

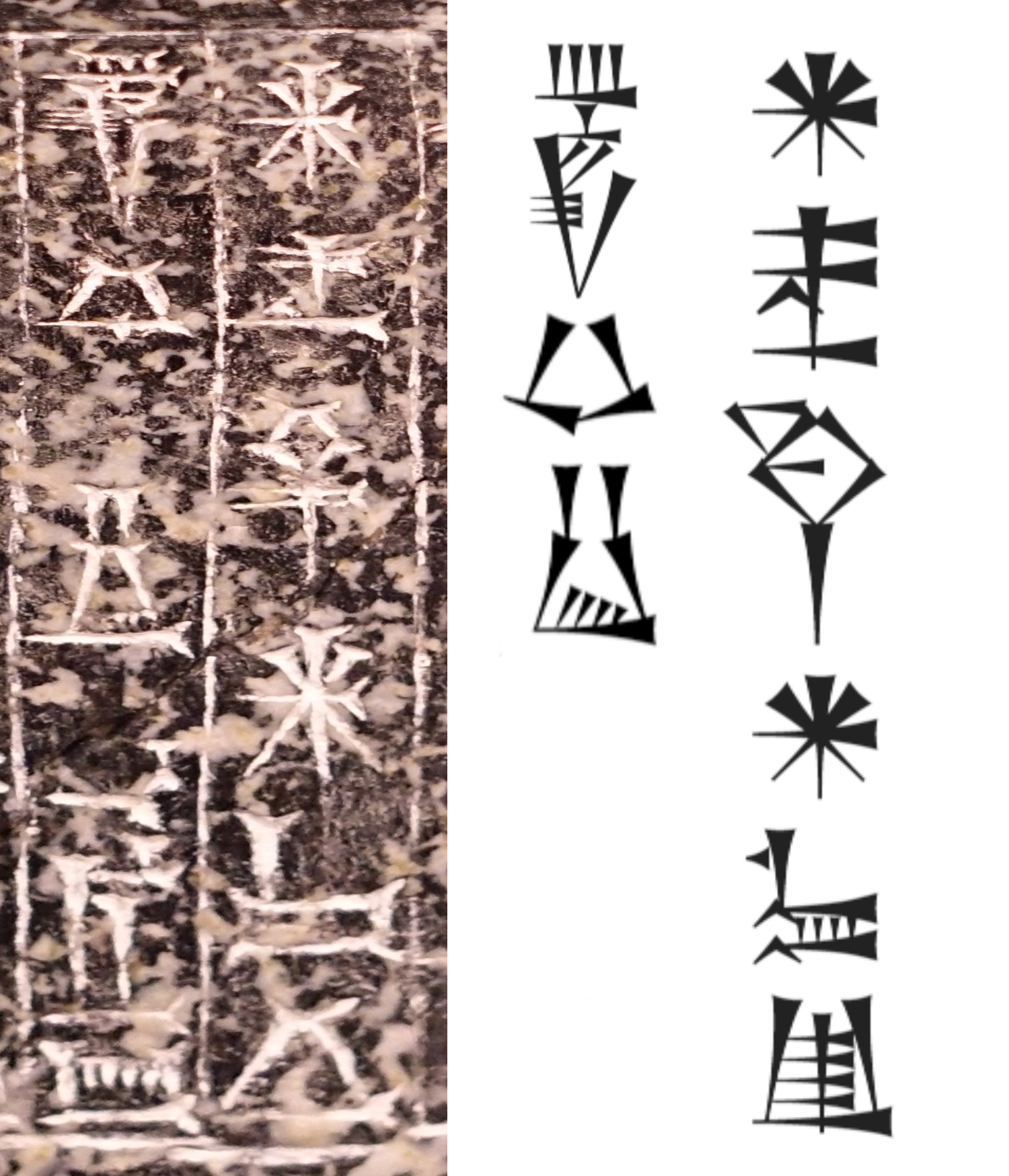
Title "Rim-Sin, King of Larsa" on the stone bowl:
𒀭𒊑𒅎𒀭𒂗𒍪 Rim-Sin
𒈗 King of
𒌓𒀕 Larsa

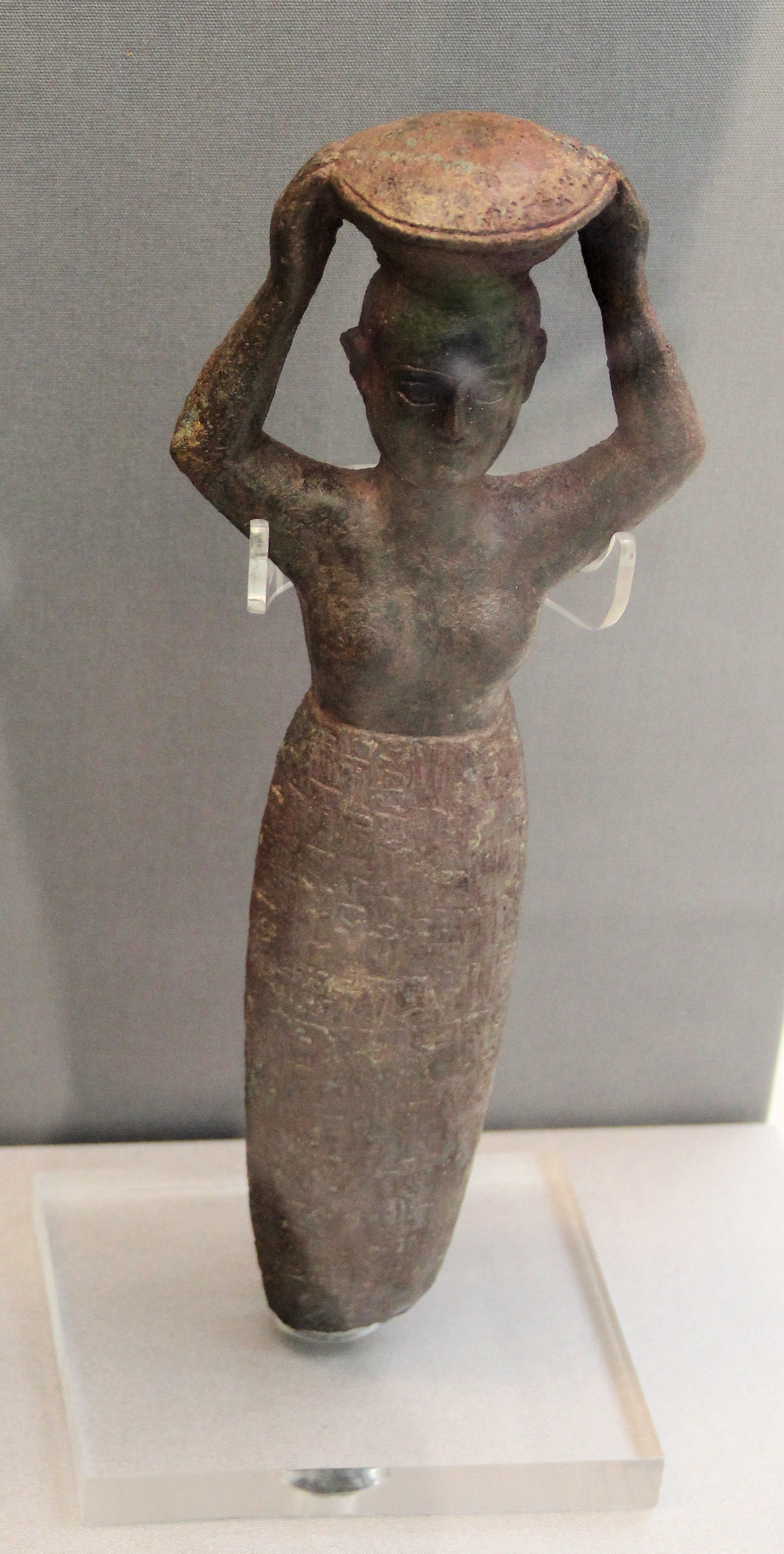
Foundation figurine of Rim-Sin for Nanaya. British Museum.

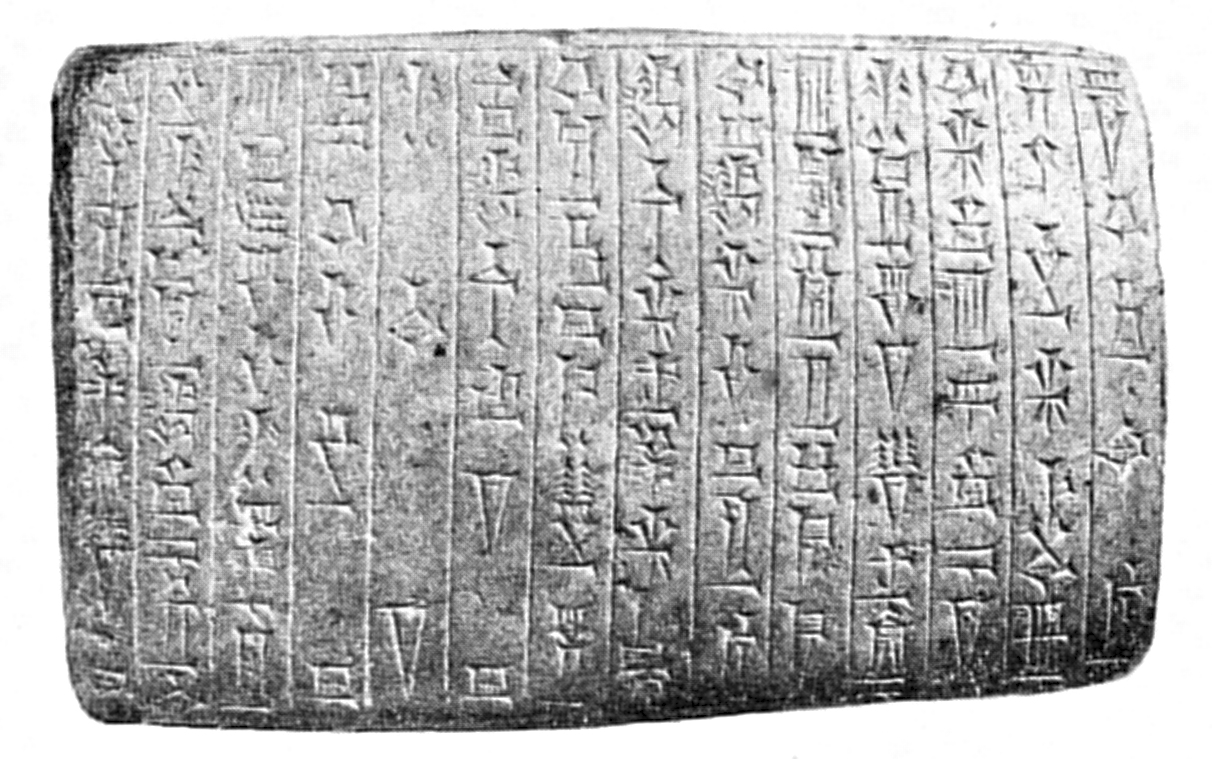
Dedication tablet of Rim-Sin king of Larsa
