= Rîm-Anum =

King of Uruk
- Reign: 18th century BC
- Predecessor: Irdanene
- Successor: Nabi-ilishu
- House: 6th Dynasty of Uruk

Location of Uruk.

Rîm-Anum "ri-im-^{d}a-nu-um" (Also RimAnum) was a ruler of Uruk, following Irdanene, for about four years (18 months has also been suggested) and most notably was part of the widespread revolt, led by Rim-Sîn II of Larsa and including 26 cities, among them Uruk, Ur, Isin and Kisurra as well as three "Elamite" governors (Tanene, Werriri, Kalumatum), against the First Dynasty of Babylon, at that time ruled by Samsu-iluna (c. 1749–1712 BC), son of Hammurabi. Texts of Samsu-iluna indicate Rîm-Anum was captured but are uncertain about whether he was put to death or spared. The beginning of the reign of Rîm-Anum is generally taken as being the 8th regnal year of Samsu-iluna (c. 1742 BC), in the eighth month. Within a few years Uruk was back under the control of Babylon with the 10th year name of Samsi-luna being "Year in which Samsu-iluna the king with the great strength of Marduk smote with weapons the troops of Ida-maras, Emutbal, Uruk and Isin". A number of southern cities including Nippur were destroyed in the course of putting sown the rebellion. Texts sent from those cites to the fort of Dūr-Abī-ešuḫ stopped when they fell. Texts from Uruk cease after the 10th year of Samsu-iluna.

While it is traditionally assumed that Rîm-Anum ruled from Uruk, at least part of the time, it has also been proposed that he ruled from Malgium.

Many tablets of Rîm-Anum were found at the temple of Sîn-kāšid during excavations at Uruk and are now held in the Iraq Museum in Baghdad and in Heidelberg. A number of Rîm-Anum texts, illegally excavated, came, via the antiquities market, from the "house of the prisoners of war" (bīt asīrī) at Uruk, many of which are held at the British Museum. Prisoners came from a number of cities including Eshnunna, Akkad, Malgium, Nērebtum, and Mutiabal. Many were dispersed to gods (the priests and temples thereof) such as An-Inanna, Kanisura, Rammānum, Šamaš, Lugal'irra and Meslamtaea. Others were put to work in a flour milling operation.

The seals of some of Rîm-Anum's servants have been found on tablets. One, found on a number of texts, "Nabi-ilīšu, archivist, son of Lakita-remeni, servant of Rîm-Anum." includes the name of Nabi-ilīšu, the same as that proposed as the successor of Rîm-Anum.

Mesopotamia at the time of Samsu-iluna

Four year names of Rîm-Anum are known, their order, and whether one is a duplicate, is uncertain:

- Year Rîm-Anum (became) king
- Year in which Rîm-Anum the king defeated the land of Emutbal, the troops of Eshnunna, Isin and Kazallu who marched together against him to make booty ... which was not counted since ancient times ... and defeated them
- Year Rîm-Anum the king, the eternal name of his lordship - Alternately "Rîm-Anum, the king, lasting offspring of kingship".
- Year (Rîm-Anum the king) put in order his dispersed people

Another version of the 2nd year name has become available:

"The year in which King Rîm-Anum, the (forces of) the land of Emutbalum, the armies of Ešnunna, Isin and Kazallu, as if all together (with him), having presented themselves at Uruk for war, inflicted a defeat upon their troops. Since time immemorial Uruk had never experienced (such) a dust storm (raised by a foreign army), but after the dust storm settled, he slaughtered (all of them) and by his power ejected (them all) from the homeland"

== See also ==
- Ilūni
- List of Mesopotamian dynasties
- Chronology of the ancient Near East
