= Rim-Sîn II =

Babylonian king

Location of Larsa

Rim-Sîn II (also Rīm-Sîn II) ruled the ancient Near East city-state of Larsa from c. 1742 BC to 1739 BC (MC) and was the last of the Dynasty of Larsa. It is now thought that his total reign lasted less than 2 years. His name was sometimes preceded by a Dingir though there is no record of him being deified. Rim-Sin II was a contemporary of Samsu-iluna of Babylon (c. 1749-1712 BC), and fellow rebels Ilūni of Eshnunna, Rim-Šara of Umma, and Rîm-Anum of Uruk. Though he joined in revolting against Babylon Rim-Anum of Uruk had been in conflict with Larsa based on his year name of "Year in which Rîm-Anum the king defeated the land of Emutbal, the troops of Eshnunna, Isin and Kazallu who marched together against him to make booty ... which was not counted since ancient times ... and defeated them". Rim-Sin II is mentioned as a son of one Warad-Sin though it is unclear if that is the Warad-Sin who was the previous ruler of Larsa. It is not even clear that he came from Larsa. In one of the letters of Rim-Sin II suggests his family came from Kesh:

"To Amurrum-illatī, speak; thus says Rim-Sin. In order to set light (upon) Emutbalum and to regather its scattered people, the great gods established firmly the foundation of my throne in Keš, the city of the one who bore me. Just as the entire land has heard and rejoiced (about it) and has come and met with me, you must also come and meet with me. ..."

Mesopotamia at the time of Samsu-iluna

Several year names of Rim-Sin II are known (note that the Emudkura temple was at Ur):

- The year Rim-Sîn [became] king
- Year the foundations of (the temple) Emudkur in Ur were laid at? the ki-eden
  - Alt - The year Rim-Sîn, the king of Ur, established the Emudkurra at
- Year in which Ninmah raised greatly in the Kesh temple, the foundation of heaven and earth, (Rim-Sin) to kingship over the land, (king) having no enemy, no hostile (king), opposing him in all foreign lands.
  - Alt - Year Ninmah elevated Rim-Sin to the kingship over all the countries in the temple of Kis, foundation of heaven and earth, and he (Rim-Sin) let not the bad and wicked come back
  - Alt - The year Ninmaḫ raised Rim-Sin, the king, to kingship (over) the entire land in the Keš temple, the temenos of heaven and earth, while the enemies, the evil Kassites, had not retreated from the land

Rim-Sîn II is primarily known for leading the Babylonian Rebellion by a number of southern cities against Babylon which at that time was led by Samsu-iluna, the son and successor of Hammurabi. A statue inscription of Samsu-iluna detailed his destruction of the rebellion, from his perspective. This conflict was mentioned (Tablet B) in the much later fragmentary Chronicle of Ancient Kings. The rebellious cities included Ur, Uruk, Larsa, Girsu, Umma, Nippur, Kazallu, Kutalla, and Bad-tibira as well as Eshnunna in the north. The rebellion began in the 8th regnal year of Samsu-iluna. Rim-Sîn II controlled the cities of Nippur and Ur for a time. Documents at Nippur were dated to Samsu-iluna until his year 8, then to Rim-Sin II, returning to being dated to Samsu-iluna in his year 11. There were Kassite troops included in his forces. The rebellion ended for Rim-Sîn II about 18 months later with his death and the fall of Larsa to Samsu-iluna with his year name of "Year in which Samsu-iluna the king with the great strength of Marduk smote with weapons the troops of Ida-maras, Emutbal, Uruk and Isin". It continued until Samsu-iluna 14 when his year name was "Year in which Samsu-iluna the king with great power smote with his weapons the hateful king(s) who had brought the people of Akkad to revolt". In a text Samsu-iluna stated:

"The year was not half over when he (Samsuiluna) killed Rim-Sin, suborner of Emutbalum, who had been elevated to the kingship of Larsa, and in the land of Kiš he heaped up a burial mound over him. Twenty-six rebel kings, his foes, he killed; he slaughtered each one of them. He captured Iluni, the king of Ešnunna, one who had not heeded his words, led him off in a neck-stock, and had his throat cut. He brought the totality of Sumer and Akkad into agreement, (and) made the four quarters dwell by his command."

== See also ==
- Chronology of the ancient Near East
- List of Mesopotamian dynasties
