= Ilūni =

Ruler of Eshnunna in Mesopotamia

King of Eshnunna
- Reign: late 1700s BC

Location of Eshnunna

Ilūni ruled the ancient Near East city-state of Eshnunna for between 8 and 20 years in the late 1700s BC. Ilūni was known to have maintained diplomatic relations with polities to its east including Niqqum, Kakmum, and Elam. One inscription has Ilūni asking Inzuršakšu (Insur-šaqšu), the ruler of Niqqum, for timber to deal with breaches on the Ṭabān river. The primary source for Ilūni is a group of 54 cuneiform texts recovered by Iraqi authorities after they had been looted and published by Basima Jaleel Abid. Information in the texts indicated that they originated at a city/kingdom called Basi. It has been suggested that the 21st Year Name of Babylon ruler Hammurabi "Year Hammurabi the king built the city wall of Baz" refers to this city. His predecessor Sin-Muballit had an identical 17th year name. A few texts mentioning wIlūni ere also found at Me-Turan. A number of looted texts from this archive are apparently in the publication process as of 2026.

The city and Kingdom of Eshnunna was conquered in roughly the 31st regnal year (mentioned in his 30th and 32nd year names) by Hammurabi (c. 1792-1750 BC) of First Babylonian Empire. Under his successor Samsu-iluna (c. 1749-1712 BC) the conquered polities in the southern and eastern of the empire, including Eshnunna, began to reassert their traditional independence beginning with a rebellion led by Rîm-Anum of Uruk in Samsu-iluna Year 10 followed by one led by Rim-Sin II of Larsa. At some point in this period Eshnunna regained its independence under the obscure ruler Lipissa (Lipit-Sin), the father of Ilūni. This is thought to have most likely occurred during the period covered by the revolts of Rîm-Anum and Rim-Sin II. A Lipissa, thought to be the same person, is mentioned in a Mari text as the leader of Eshnunna garrison of Ekallatum prevented by Išme-Dagan I (c. 1776-1765 BC), of the Kingdom of Upper Mesopotamia, from leaving. Lipsissa, called a general, then returns to Eshnunna. Eshnunna is known to have been an ally of the Kingdom of Upper Mesopotamia at that time. The fall of that kingdom created by Samši-Adad I in the middle of the 1700s BC left a power vacuum in the east where polities like Eshnunna and Niqqum competed.

At some point there was peace between Ilūni and Samsu-iluna and Babylon. In one text from Ilūni it reads:

"Say to Hadan-huha: Thus speaks Iluni. Previously, an attack by Suteans within the land occurred. I wrote to Babylon regarding this attack. Samsu-iluna wrote me words of goodwill. I have just written to Babylon to establish a peace pact (?). You are aware of this! Intermediaries: Buhum the horseman, Ṣillī-Tišpak the horseman, Ibniya… a native of Kakmûm. The 20th of month XI. The year King Iluni dredged the Diyala, whose mouth had become blocked following the disaster."

Based on a fragmentary statue inscription Samsu-iluna defeated and killed Ilūni in Samsu-iluna year 20 so the reign of Ilūni, allowing for traditional 6 regnal years, would have run from roughly c. 1735 BC until c. 1729 BC. If the at least 20 year reign for Ilūni indicated by the Basi texts is correct his reign would be more like c. 1749-1729 BC (Abed proposes 1759–1726 BC). Of course although Basi was clearly in the territory of Eshnunna it is not fully certain he was ruler of Eshnunna the entire time, versus Lipissa. It is also known that Ilūni was in a position of power in Eshnunna while Rîm-Anum ruled in Uruk based on a record of the Uruk prisoner center which read "Šamaš-naḫrārī, a man of Ešnunna, of Ilūni, the ensi2, man of Ešnunna, whom Dagānma-AN has sent from Mutiabal, royal gift to the god Šamaš. Received by Ubār-Šamaš, the chief administrator of the temple of the god Šamaš.". In an inscription commemorating the rebuilding of the wall of Kish Samsu-iluna stated:

"The year was not half over when he killed Rim-Sin, who had caused Yamutbal to rebel, (and) who had been elevated to the kingship of Larsa. In the land of Kiš he heaped up a burial mound (over him) (damtam išpuk). Twenty-six rebel kings, his foes, he killed; he destroyed all of them. He defeated Iluni, the king of Ešnunna, one who had not heeded his decrees, led him off in a neck-stock, and had his throat cut. He made the totality of the land of Sumer and Akkad be at peace, made the four quarters abide by his decree."

The Basi texts paint a much different and more nuanced picture of the conflict between Ilūni and Samsu-iluna, though the defeat of Ilūni by Samsu-iluna at the end remains the same.

One text (BM 134535) from a Ilūni to "the son of my lord", invoking Shamash and Marduk, is generally now not thought to have been the Ilūni who ruled Eshnunna. Similarly in (BM 97074) "Speak to Ilsu-ibni. Thus says Iluni. May Samas and Marduk keep you in good health. Concerning what you wrote to me, this (is what) you (said): "Ipqu-ilisu the judge has spoken at length against me in the assembly. ...", (BM 97256), (BM 97249), and (BM 97074).

== Year names ==
A number of year names of Ilūni, some partial, were known prior to the publication of the Basi texts. Only the order of a few are certain:

- mu i-lu-ni lugal - Year: Ilūni (became) king
- mu us2-sa i-lu-ni lugal - Year after the year: Ilūni (became) king
- mu bad3 iri ag-si-aki ba-gul - Year: (Ilūni) destroyed the wall of Agsia
- mu bad3 za-ab-ba-anki ba-dim2 - Year: (Ilūni) built the wall of Zabbân
- mu mus2-sa bad3 iri za-ab-ba-anki u3 iri la-szar-mar ba-dim2 - Year after the year: (Ilūni) built the walls of Zabbân and Lašamar
- mu alan dgeštin-an-na - Year: the statue of Geštinanna
- mu dingir-ni lugal-e i7 dur-ul3 nig2-ha-lam-ma-ta ka ba-uš2-a mu-un-ba-al-la2 - Year: Ilūni, the king, dug the mouth of the Diyala that was obstructed after the catastrophe

The Basi texts held 20 local year names for Ilūni, many covering local matters like waterway maintenance and fortifications. Examples of some new year names are:

- Year: King Ilūni secured and cleared the banks of the Turul and Ṭaban rivers with stone walls.
- Year: The king constructed a great defensive ring [fortress line] against the external enemies.
- Year: the king Ilūni has been digged Dayala river and made the golden monument for the goddess Anunitum (verbatim from Abed monograph)

== See also ==
- Chronology of the ancient Near East
- List of Mesopotamian dynasties
