= Eshnunna =

Archaeological site in Iraq

- Tell Asmar
- Location within Iraq
- 33°29′3″N 44°43′42″E
- Type: settlement
- Periods: Bronze Age
- Cultures: Early Dynastic, Akkadian, Ur III, Isin-Larsa, Old Babylonian
- Location: Iraq

History
- Built: Late 4th Millennium BC

Site notes
- Excavation dates: 1930 to 1936, 2001-2002
- Archaeologists: Henri Frankfort, Seton Lloyd, Thorkild Jacobsen, Salah Rumaid
- Condition: Ruined
- Owner: Public
- Public access: Yes

Eshnunna (Ešnunna, also Ašnunna, Išnun, Ašnun, Ašnunnak, and Ešnunak.) (modern Tell Asmar in Diyala Governorate, Iraq) was an ancient Sumerian (and later Akkadian) city and city-state in central Mesopotamia 12.6 miles northwest of Tell Agrab and 15 miles northwest of Tell Ishchali. Although situated in the Diyala Valley northwest of Sumer proper, the city nonetheless belonged securely within the Sumerian cultural milieu. It is sometimes, in very early archaeological papers, called Ashnunnak or Tupliaš.

The tutelary deity of the city was Tishpak (Tišpak) though other gods, including Sin, Adad, and Inanna of Kiti (Kitītum) were also worshiped there. The personal goddesses of the rulers were Belet-Šuḫnir and Belet-Terraban.

== History ==
=== Early Bronze ===
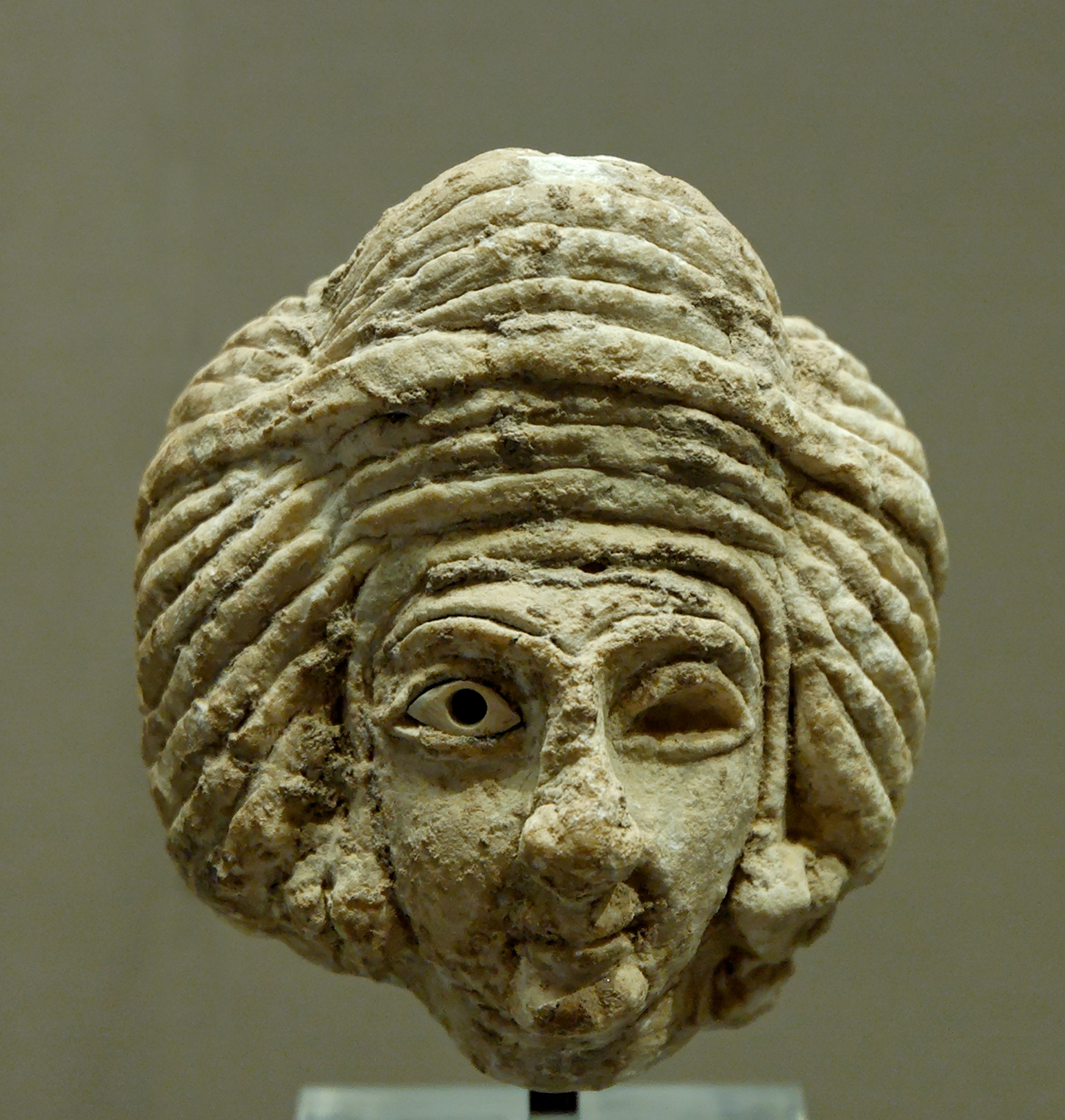
Womans head from Tell Asmar

Inhabited since the Jemdet Nasr period, around 3000 BC, Eshnunna was a major city during the Early Dynastic period of Mesopotamia. It is known, from cuneiform records and excavations, that the city was occupied in the Akkadian period though its extent was noticeably less than it reached in Ur III times. Areas of the Northern Palace date to this period and show some of the earliest examples of widespread sewage disposal engineering including toilets in private homes.

==== Ur III period ====
The first known rulers of the city were a series of vassal governors under the Third dynasty of Ur. Eshnunna may have had special relationships to the royal family. For example, Shulgi's wife Shulgi-Simtum showed devotion to two goddesses closely connected with the governor's dynasty at Eshnunna, and Shu-Sin's uncle Babati temporarily lived in Eshnunna.

Ituria is attested as the governor of Eshnunna under Ur from at least Su-Sun year 9 to Ibbi-Sin year 2. He erected a temple to Shu-Sin in a new lower town. Soon after Shu-Sin's death, Ituria was followed by his son Šu-ilišu, who in 2026 BC got rid of the Ur III calendar and replaced it with a local one. He also stopped calling himself the ensi (governor) of Eshnunna, instead referring to himself as lugal (king) and "beloved of Tishpak". His seal also mentioned the deities Belat-Shuhnir and Belat-Terraban. His personal seal shows him facing the god Tishpak, who is holding a rod and ring in one hand and an axe in the other while standing on two subdued enemies.

=== Middle Bronze ===
==== Isin-Larsa period ====
After the fall of the Ur III empire there was a period of chaos in Akkad with numerous city-states vying for power. Eshnunna established itself, for about 15 years, as the independent state of Warum. It was then briefly seized by Subartu who may have ousted Shu-iliya. Ishbi-Erra (in his 9th year, circa 2010 BC) of the southern Mesopotamia city of Isin defeated Subartu and installed Nur-ahum as the new ruler of Eshnunna. Bricks were found with his standard inscription "Nur-ahum, beloved of the god Tispak, governor of Esnunna".

Rulers of Eshnunna after Shu-iliya would call themselves the steward of Eshnunna on behalf of Tishpak, and Tishpak even took on traditional titles usually attested by kings. The seal of Shu-iliya had him ruling under Tishpak i.e. "Tišpak, mighty king, king of the land Warum, king of the four quarters, Shu-iliya (is) his...".

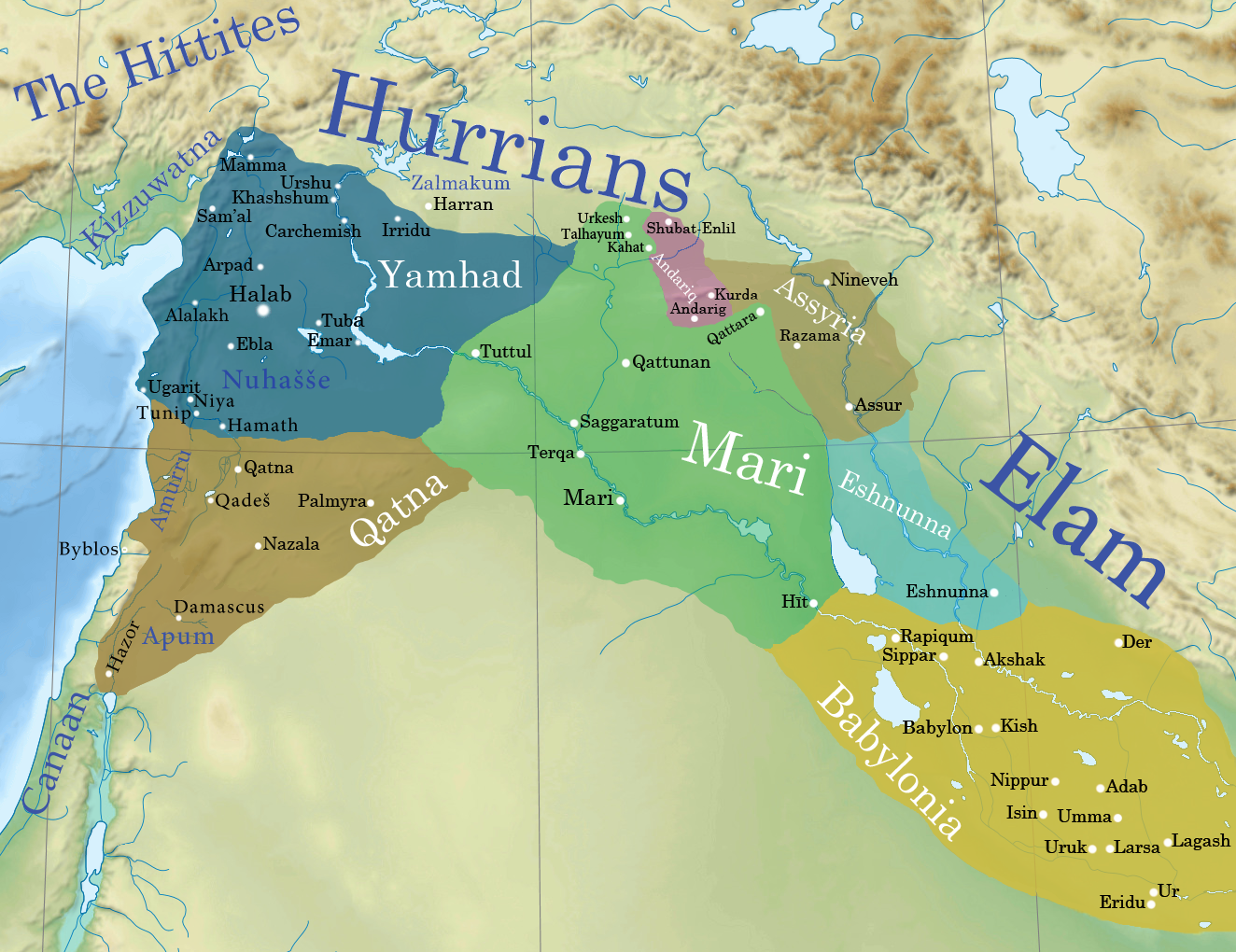
Extent of Eshnunna's influence c. 1764 BC (in light blue).

Kirikiri then ousted Nur-ahum from power. Not having ties to the previous ruler, he was likely an usurper, and a fire destroyed the northwestern part of the Su-Sin temple. However, he still called himself “ensi of Eshnunna” on behalf of Tishpak. An alternative view is that Kirikiri was actually the brother of Nur-ahum. Kirikiri established a new line of rulers with his son Bilalama. Bilalama formed a diplomatic marriage with Elam, giving his daughter Me-Kubi to Tan-Ruhuratir. The name of Kirikiri is non-Semitic, and possibly Elamite.

Bilalama attempted to maintain good relationships with Ilum-muttabbil of Der and Elam, although Der and Elam were at war. Bilalama was succeeded by Ishar-ramassu. The palace was then destroyed in a fire, which may have been the result of a foreign invasion. Ilum-mutabbil of Der may have taken Eshnunna and replaced Ishar-ramassu with Usur-awasu, which if the case would have meant that Der had attempted to break up the alliance between Elam and Eshnunna. The reigns of the successors Azuzum, Ur-Ninmarki and Ur-Ningishzida appeared to have been peaceful. There followed a period of political uncertainty in the Diyala.

The successor of Ur-Ningishzida, Ipiq-Adad I, was a son of Ur-Ninmarki. He was generally referred by his contemporaries as “prince,” a title that subsequent rulers of Eshnunna would still sometimes be referred to as. (Note: A common designation for the ruling house of Eshnunna in the Mari letters was “House of Tishpak” or “House of Tishpak and the Prince.” Charpin recently suggested that this ideology may have been based on the etymology of Eshnunna, EŠ_{3}.NUN.NA, sanctuary of the prince) He is the earliest king of Eshnunna that the discovered correspondence letters were addressed to, which provided syncretisms between various rulers in the Diyala. The year name that mentioned Sumu-abum being expelled to Der possibly dates to the reign of Ipiq-Adad I, or sometime around his reign.

Ipiq-Adad's successor, Sharriya, is only known from two year names. Sharriya's successor, Warissa, is known from seven year names, including ones that celebrate his conquest of the cities Ishur, Tutub and Nerebtum (Kiti). Warissa's successor, Belakum, is known to have signed a treaty with an unnamed king, at around the same time as a treaty with the rulers of Nerebtum and Shadlash.

Ibal-pi-El I is known to have concluded a treaty with Sin-Iddinam of Larsa and Sîn-kāšid of Uruk against Sabium of Babylon and Ikūn-pî-Sîn of Nerebtum. However, this does create a chronological problem, as the start of the reign of Ipiq-Adad II is generally dated to 1860 BC via the Mari Eponym Chronicle, before the conclusion of this treaty which is generally dated to around 1842 BC. Guichard proposed that Ipiq-Adad's reign was perhaps interrupted by another Ibal-pi-El who signed the treaty, before Ipiq-Adad regained his position, or perhaps that there were actually two Ipiq-Adad's behind the 46 years allotted to Ipiq-Adad II in the Eponym Chronicles, Ipiq-Adad II and Ipiq-Adad III, of which Ipiq-Adad III would be the son of Ibal-pi-El I, the one who signed the treaty. The second proposal by Guichard is accepted by Nahm, who also suggests that the conquest of Rapiqum was done by Ipiq-Adad III. On the other hand, de Boer and De Graef suggests that the Mari Chronicle was likely wrong on the ascension time of Ipiq-Adad, dating it too early. Wasserman & Bloch instead suggest that perhaps Ipiq-Adad II became a co-regent of Ibal-pi-El I, which was recorded into the Eponym Chronicles as his ascension year (“into his father’s house”) while Ibal-pi-El continued to rule Eshnunna in this time frame, in a manner similar to that with Sin-iddinam of Larsa and his father Nur-Adad.

The 6th year name of Sin-iddinam claims that he destroyed Anshan and Eshnunna. Guichard claimed that this was an impetus for Eshnunna to seek the above alliance with Larsa.

Ipiq-adad II was the first king of Eshnunna to put the divine determinative before the name since Shu-Iliya, and took on the titles "mighty king" "king of the world" and "king who enlarged the kingdom of Eshnunna." The Mari Chronicles mentions that he defeated Aminum of Assur but was defeated by Elam. Later, he effectively brought the Diyala region under the control of Eshnunna. Ipiq-Adad II may have also conquered Rapiqum, but the year-name had been suggested by other scholars to instead be an alternative form of Hammurabi's 11th year name, which celebrated his conquest of Rapiqum. However, Lacambre and von Koppen argue that it should be read as a year name for Ipiq-Adad, likely towards the end of his reign. Rapiqum was later also conquered by Dadusha and then Ibal-pi-El II. Eventually, through the ambitions of both Sumu-la-El of Babylon and Ipiq-Adad II a line of demarcation between the two kingdoms was formed, running somewhere along Sippar-Amnanum. The boundary line changed multiple times after that, with Apil-Sin conquering Ashtabala and other cities along the Tigris, which was reversed by Naram-Sin of Eshnunna.

Naram-Sin, the successor of Ipiq-Adad II, also continued to use the divine determinative before his name and used similar ambitious epithets. Naram-Sin was also mentioned in Assyrian King List in the section on Shamshi-Adad I, being the one who forced Shamshi-Adad I into exile. The Laws of Eshnunna and the building of the Naram-Sin audience hall were from the reign of Naram-Sin of Eshnunna.

Mari, during the reign of Yahdum-Lim, adopted the writing system from Eshnunna with its sign usage and tablet shape, and a later letter addressed from Ibal-pi-El II to Zimri-Lim at the beginning of the latter's reign mentioned that Yahdun-Lim called the king of Eshnunna "father" which indicates a superior position on the part of the king of Eshnunna. Yahdum-Lim also bought the region of Puzurran from Eshnunna. Pongratz-Leisten suggests that the political power of Eshnunna extended to cultural influence with its neighbors, which could be seen from the similarities in style between the Dadusha stela, Mardin stela and the Yahdun-Lim's building inscriptions, which may have in turn influenced Assyria's ideology later. (Note: Pongratz-Leisten also pointed out the similarities between the royal discourse of Ashur and Tishpak, as both gods were considered the king while the human king was the governor on their behalf. However, she attributes it to an older cultural sphere, and includes Early Dynastic period Lagash. Note that Charpin also sees similarities with Der’s god, Ishtaran.)

After the death of Naram-Sin, three kings, Iqish-Tishpak, Ibbi-Sin, and Dannum-tahaz, ruled in short succession. Out of the three, Iqish-Tishpak was unrelated to Ipiq-Adad II and was probably a usurper. The sequence of these three rulers has not been established with certainty. After these three rulers, Dadusha, a brother of Naram-Sin, became king of Eshnunna.

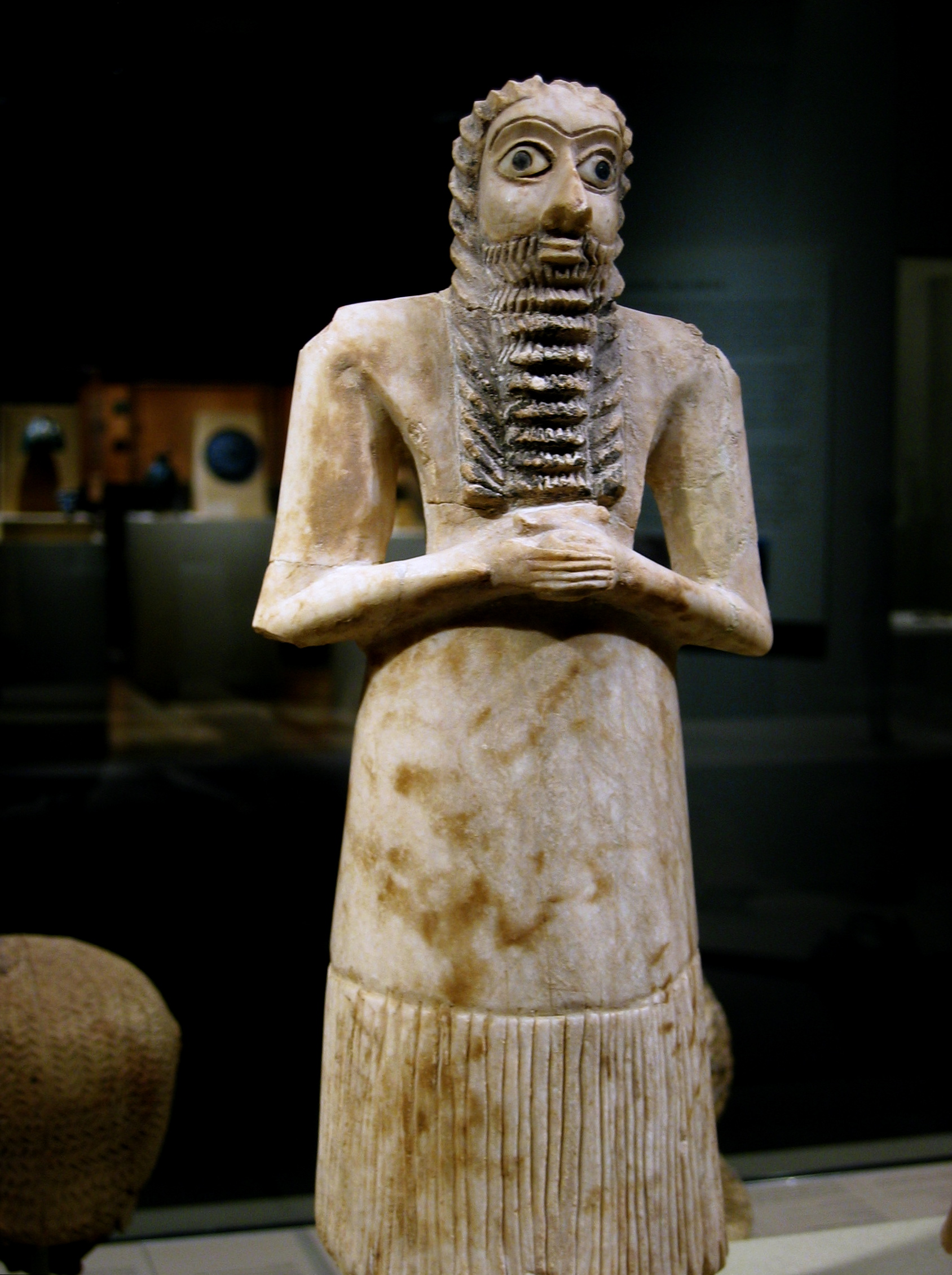
Sumerian male worshiper, in alabaster with shell eyes. It is one of the twelve statues found in the Tell Asmar Hoard.

Shamshi-Adad I, Amorite ruler of the Kingdom of Upper Mesopotamia, had multiple conflicts with the kingdom of Eshnunna, especially over the cities of Saduppum and Nerebtum. A letter addressed to the later king of Mari Zimri-Lim described how Shamshi-Adad had once called the king of Eshnunna his lord. Dadusha, the king of Eshnunna during this time, also sent an invitation to Hammurabi of Babylon to join him in the expedition to Maniksum, which Hammurabi refused. Dadusha also launched an offensive to the middle-Euphrates, but Ishme-Dagan reassured Yasmah-Addu that there are plans for a counter-attack. A peace treaty was eventually signed between Shamshi-Adad and Dadusha. Both would eventually cooperate in a campaign against Qabra, and Shamshi-Adad and Dadusha's recount of the events were recorded in the Mardin stela and Dadusha stela respectively. The victory over Qabra was celebrated in the following year name of Dadusha, although the king would later die in the same year.

Negotiations with Dadusha's successor Ibal-pi-El II proved difficult for Shamshi-Adad, and envoys from Eshnunna continued to come to Shamshi-Adad's kingdom to negotiate an agreement years later. Later, during the eponym of Nimer-Sin, Shamshi-Adad's troops would join Eshnunna and Babylon's in a campaign against Malgium.

Late in the reign of Shamshi-Adad, ruler of the Kingdom of Upper Mesopotamia, he placed his sons Ishme-Dagan as governor in Ekallatum and Yasmah-Addu as governor in Mari. After the death of Shamshi-Adad, Zimri-Lim would take the throne of Mari and Yasmah-Addu would disappear. The disappearance of Yasmah-Addu is usually attributed to a Simal tribal chief called Bannum. However, Heimpel suggests that Eshnunna may have played a role in Yasmah-Addu's decision to flee Mari. Ibal-pi-El entered negotiations with Zimri-Lim, proposing to draw the border of their respective kingdoms at Harradum and to renew the relationship between Mari and Eshnunna from the time of the Mariote king Yahdun-Lim. He informed his benefactor Yarim-Lim, king of Yamhad (Aleppo) that although Eshnunna wanted to forge an alliance, Zimri-Lim always turned the envoys down, which may not have been the case as there were several discussions between him and Eshnunna during this time. Ultimately, Zimri-Lim did not consider the agreement satisfactory, as he wanted to control the Suhum, and rejected the offer. The need to evacuate people from the Suhum in the 3rd (2nd) (Note: Charpin & Ziegler established a new chronology in 2003. The old chronology by Birot is still sometimes used, and so will be in brackets.) year of Zimri-Lim could imply a renewed offensive by Eshnunna. Mari and Eshnunna would be at war between the 3rd year and the 5th (2nd and 4th) years of Zimri-Lim. Eshnunna captured Rapiqum in the 3rd (2nd) year of Zimri-Lim, which was celebrated in Ibal-pi-El's 9th year name. Later Ibal-pi-El sent an ultimatum to Zimri-Lim that he would take Shubat-Enlil. The army of Eshnunna, led by former king of Allahad Atamrum and the Yaminite chief Yaggih-Addu took Assur and Ekallatum, and the event was described in a letter to Zimri-Lim how "Assur, Ekallatum and Eshnunna have now become one house." Ishme-Dagan seemed to have left the capital to go to Babylon before Ekallatum was invaded. Eshnunna succeeded in capturing Shubat-Enlil, which seemed to have caused the submission of several kings in the region to Eshnunna. Eshnunna laid siege to Kurda after the city rejected the peace offerings, but they failed the siege and had to fall back to Andarig. They also supported the Yaminites against Zimri-Lim, who had to deal with a revolt by them earlier in his reign. Zimri-Lim, in his 4th (3rd) year, stayed at Ashlakka for a while, a city which he took in his 3rd (2nd) year, likely using the city as a base of operations to attack the Eshnunnian army. Then, Eshnunna withdrew from Shubat-Enlil leaving Yanuh-Samar behind as king with a few thousand troops, likely because they were attacked by Halmam. Zimri-Lim then successfully sieged Andarig and took the city. The Yaminites also attacked Mari at this time, and Charpin suggested that there was a plan to have the Eshnunnian army and the Yaminites meet, although it wasn't successful.

After Mari took back Andarig, they began peace talks, although several groups in Mari were against concluding a peace treaty with Eshnunna, with the most famous case being a line from an oracle of Dagan being relayed to Zimri-Lim in three different tablets, that "beneath straw runs water." In particular, Inib-shina (priestess and sister of Zimri-Lim) directly connects the oracle with the king of Eshnunna, and mentions that Dagan will destroy Ibal-pi-El. Lupakhum, someone also connected with the god Dagan, gave a vague warning about Eshnunna, and reprimanded the goddess Dērītum for counting on a peace treaty with Eshnunna. Regardless, Zimri-Lim signed the treaty with the king of Eshnunna. With the treaty between Zimri-Lim and Ibal-pi-El in Zimri-Lim's 5th year, Mari was able to keep Hit, and Rapiqum was given to Babylon.

By the 6th year of Zimri-Lim, then the geopolitical situation had grown very complicated, as shown in a letter sent to Zimri-Lim (Zimri-Lim's Mari is likely not mentioned because it is taken for granted):

"No king is truly powerful just on his own: ten to fifteen kings follow Hammurabi of Babylon, as many follow Rim-Sin of Larsa, as many follow Ibal-pi-El of Eshnunna, and as many follow Amut-pi-El of Qatna; but twenty kings follow Yarim-Lim of Yamhad"

Later, between Zimri-Lim's 8th and 10th (7th year and 9th) year, contact with Elam increased with gift exchanges going both sides, with Mari receiving tin on multiple occasions. The sukkalmah of Elam had henceforth occupied a high position in international relations, and eventually Siwe-palar-huppak asked both Mari and Babylon for support against Eshnunna in Zimri-Lim's 8th (7th) year, which both obliged. Elam would succeed in taking Eshnunna early on in Zimri-Lim's 10th (9th) year. Durand recently suggested that Eshnunna may have acted as an agent of Elam prior to Ibal-pi-El, which means that the Elamite invasion of Eshnunna was essentially an act against a rogue vassal. However, eventually an anti-Elamite coalition was formed, and Elam was forced to retreat back, but not before sacking the city of Eshnunna. Hammurabi would later write a letter to the sukkalmah that he did say the people of Eshnunna "would not fail to live up to their reputation as rebels."

Hammurabi had expressed interest in taking the throne of Eshnunna, and Zimri-Lim had encouraged it, and if the people of Eshnunna disagreed, to install a prince loyal to Hammurabi onto the throne of Eshnunna. The letter also implies that some members of the royal family of Eshnunna fled and sought refuge in Babylon during the upheaval. However, Silli-Sin, who was not related to the previous royal family of Eshnunna, was installed as king in Eshnunna by the Eshnunnian troops. Hammurabi and Silli-Sin exchanged tablets with each other to swear oaths. Later, the new king of Eshnunna blocked messengers between Elam and Babylon when the two were trying to reestablish relationships, which likely resulted in a rise in tension between Babylon and Eshnunna. Silli-Sin would later send a letter telling Ishme-Dagan and Hammurabi of Kurda to not send troops to Babylon even if asked and even tried to ask Zimri-Lim to do the same, but the messenger was intercepted and the incident was reported to Zimri-Lim.

Troops from Mari were still stationed in Babylonian territory from the previous war with Elam, and Zimri-Lim wished to recover them. Hammurabi, when asked later to send the troops back to Mari, cited concerns with Eshnunna as the reason for why he was reluctant to do so. Charpin suggests that the territorial demands from Hammurabi were to discourage the new king of Eshnunna, as he would not conclude peace with Eshnunna if he was not given Upi, Shahaduni and the banks of the Tigris. Silli-Sin seemed to have rejected these proposals. Silli-Sin may have also called for a mobilization of troops, which would have worried Hammurabi.

Ishme-Dagan also forsook his past alliance with Mari and Babylon and allied with Eshnunna, perhaps because Atamrum was given control of Shubat-Enlil. Atumrum seemed to have kept his old allegiance to Eshnunna, since Eshnunna was listed as one of his allies. However, the relationship between them seemed to have deteriorated as Atumrum later moved the troops from Eshnunna to a new quarters, which the soldiers complained was "a city in ruins."

Representatives of Eshnunna was present in a treaty talk between Atamrum (king of Andarig and Allahad) and Ashkur-Addu (king of Karana). Heimpel remarks that the presence of a diplomat from Eshnunna was remarkable as Eshnunna and now an indirect enemy of Andarig and Karana for supporting Ishme-Dagan, and suggests that they were tolerated as observers as they were not officially enemies. Eshnunna seemed to have finally concluded a peace treaty with Babylon, and so dropped their support of Ishme-Dagan. Hammurabi and Silli-Sin also had a diplomatic marriage, where one of Hammurabi's daughters was married to Silli-Sin.

In 1762 BC, in Year 31 of Hammurabi of Babylon, the Babylonians occupied the city of Eshnunna. He returned the titular deity of Assur which had been removed when Eshnunna captured the city of Assur. The fate of Silli-Sin is unknown, as the Mari archives would end 4 months later.

In his 38th year name, Hammurabi would claim to have destroyed Eshnunna with a flood.

In the Code of Hammurabi, the king states that he was the pious prince who brightened Tishpak's face, which Charpin links to the ideology of the kings of Eshnunna, indicating that Hammurabi was presenting himself as the rightful king of Eshnunna. Charpin also notes that similarly, in Samsu-iluna's inscriptions, he called himself prince after talking about his suppression of the revolt in Eshnunna, meaning that Samsu-iluna considered himself the king of Eshnunna after killing Ilūni.

During the reign of Hammurabi's successor Samsu-iluna, multiple insurgencies started from various Mesopotamian cities, with Ilūni as the rebel king in Eshnunna. Ilūni has at least 6 year names that can be attributed to his reign. Tablet archives from the Iraq Museum count 7 year names.

Although it was previously thought that Ilūni seized the throne of Eshnunna during the rebellion period similar to the likes of Rim-Sîn II or Rîm-Anum, newly published texts in 2018 appear to suggest that Ilūni ascended to the throne of his father Lipissa. This possibly suggests that it was Lipissa, not Ilūni, who restored Eshnunna's independence. Wasserman and Bloch also considered the possibility that this Lipissa was the same Lipissa (Lipit-Sin) that led the reinforcement troops from Eshnunna for Ishme-Dagan's war against the Turukkeans.

The rebel kings were sometimes allies, but there were also conflicts between them. Samsu-iluna mentions defeating Rim-Sîn II (rebel king in Larsa) and Ilūni in an inscription. It had been thought that the inscription jointly commemorates his defeat of Rim-Sîn II in year 10 with his defeat of Eshnunna in year 19 (20th year name), but a few variations of Samsi-iluna's 10th year name suggests a victory over Eshnunna and the Yamutbal. Thus, the inscription actually commemorates events about a decade after they had already taken place, as he celebrated restoring the city wall of Kish that happened in his 23rd year (24th year name). Rim-Anum, the rebel king in Uruk, similarly claimed to have defeated Yamutbal, Eshnunna, Isin and Kazallu. While Samsu-iluna did succeed in quelling the rebellion in the south, places like Eshnunna remained independent for a while. Samsi-iluna's 20th year name referring to the defeat of Eshnunna may be the final defeat of Ilūni.

After Ilūni, an inscription of Samsu-Ditana mentions victory over a certain Ahushina, the king of Eshnunna.

=== Late Bronze ===
In the 12th century BC the Elamite ruler Shutruk-Nakhunte conquered Eshnunna and carried back a number of statues, ranging from the Akkadian period to the Old Babylonian period, to Susa.

Because of its promise of control over lucrative trade routes, Eshnunna could function somewhat as a gateway between Mesopotamian and Elamite culture. The trade routes gave it access to many exotic, sought-after goods such as horses from the north, copper, tin, and other metals and precious stones. In a grave in Eshnunna, a pendant made of copal from Zanzibar was found. A small number of seals and beads from the Indus Valley civilization were also found.

== Archaeology ==
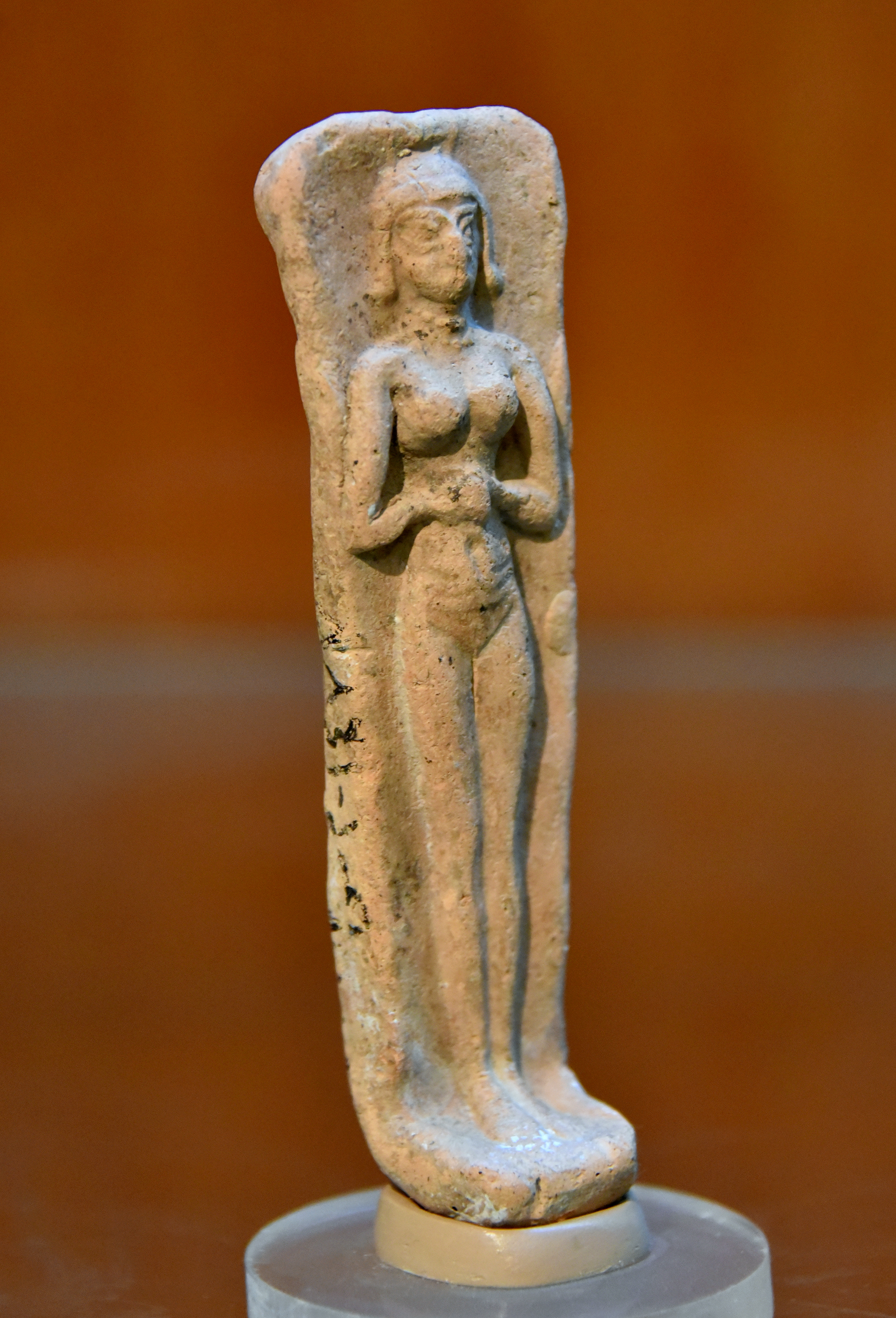
Old-Babylonian plaque of a nude female, from Tell Asmar, Iraq

The remains of the ancient city are now preserved in the tell, or archaeological settlement mound, of Tell Asmar, some 50 miles northeast of Baghdad and 15 km in a straight line east of Baqubah. It was first located by Henri Pognon in 1892 but he neglected to report the location before he died in 1921. It was refound, after antiquities from the site began to appear in dealers shops in Baghdad, and excavated in six seasons between 1930 and 1936 by an Oriental Institute of the University of Chicago team led by Henri Frankfort with Thorkild Jacobsen, Pinhas Delougaz, Gordon Loud, and Seton Lloyd. The expedition's field secretary was Mary Chubb.

The primary focuses of the Chicago excavations were the palace and the attached temple (28 meters by 28 meters with 3 meter wide walls) of Su-Sin (termed by the excavators The Palace of the Rulers and The Gimilsin Temple respectively). The palace was built during the time of Ur III ruler Shugi and the Temple by governor Ituria to the deified Ur III ruler Su-Sin during his reign. The palace was partially destroyed during the reign of Bilalama but was eventually fully restored. The remaining excavation efforts were directed to the Abu Temple whose beginnings went back to the Early Dynastic I period and which had undergone a series of major changes over the centuries. A large Southern Building was discovered, believed to be from the time of Ipiq-Adad II, of which only the foundations remained. A number of private houses and a palace from the Akkadian period were also excavated. Much effort was also put into the search for E-sikil, temple of Tishpak, without success. In records written in Sumerian the temple is dedicated to Ninazu while those in Akkadian refer to Tishpak.

Despite the length of time since the excavations at Tell Asmar, the work of examining and publishing the remaining finds from that dig continues to this day. These finds include, terracotta figurines, toys, necklaces, cylinder seals, and roughly 200 clay sealings (about 85% container sealing and 15% door sealings) and around 1,750 cuneiform tablets (about 1000 of which came from the palace). Because only inexperienced laborers were available many of the tablets were damaged or broken during the excavation. A project to clean, bake, and catalog all the tablets did not occur until the 1970s. The tablets from the Akkadian period were published in 1961. While most of the Eshnunna tablets are of an administrative nature 58 are letters which are rare in this time period. The letters are written in an early form of the Old Babylonian dialect of the Akkadian language, termed "archaic Old Babylonian". They are roughly in two groups a) earlier primarily from the reigns of Bilalama, Nur-ahum and Kirikiri and b) later primarily from the reigns of Usur-awassu, Ur-Ninmar, and Ipiq-Adad I. A single tablet was in the Old Assyrian "Cappadician" dialect of Akkadian.

From 2001 until 2002, Iraqi archaeologists worked at Tell Asmar. Excavation focused on an area of private houses in the southern part of the site. Nineteen cylinder seals, two very damaged, were recovered. One seal is inscribed "Azuzum Governor of the (city of) Eshnunna Atta-ilī Scribe, your/his slave". Another reads "Bilalama! beloved [of the god Tishpak] ruler of the (city of) Eshnunna Ilšu-dan on of Ur-Ninsun the scribe (is) your/his servant". The final report from that excavation is in the publication process.

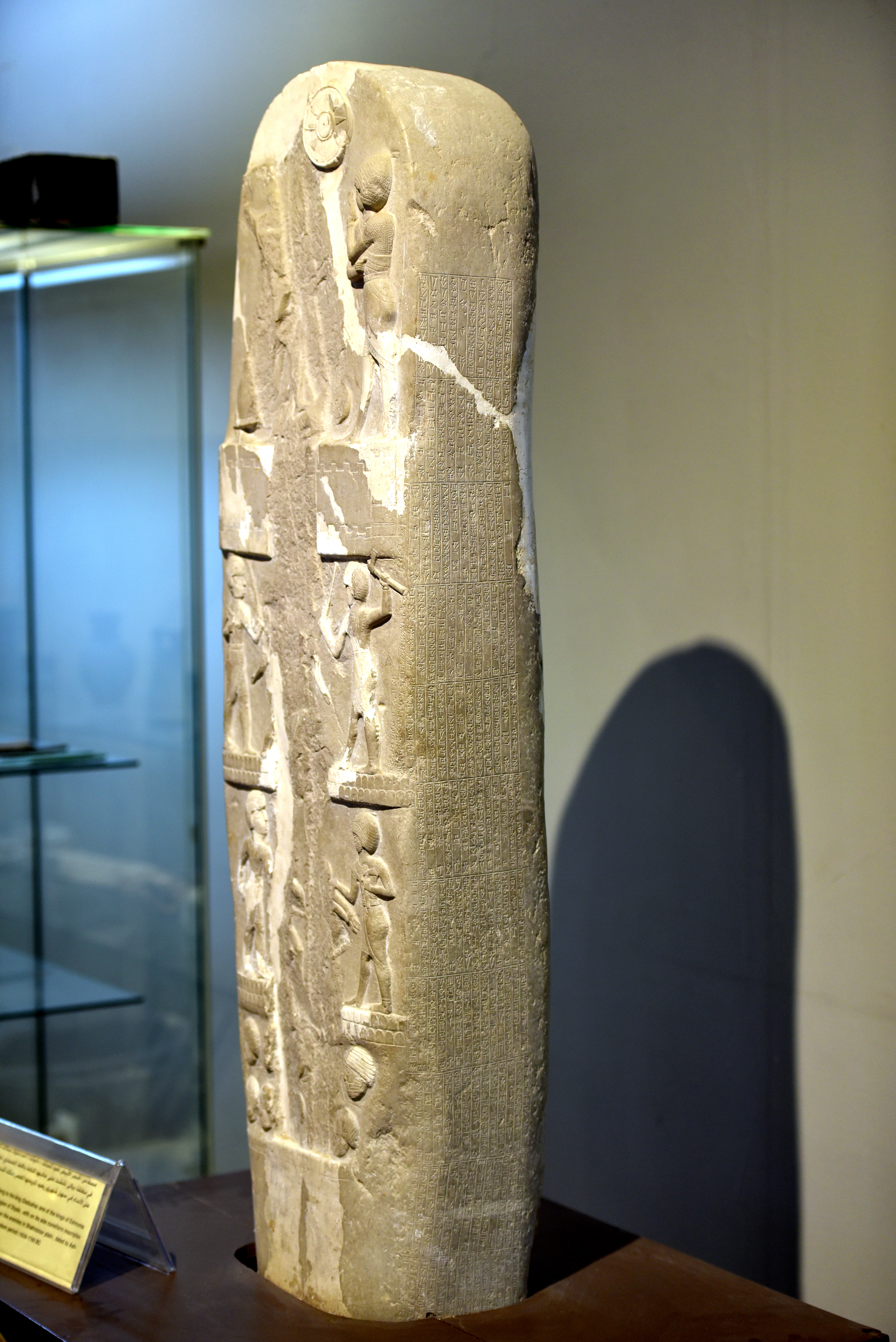
Stele of Dadusha

=== Square Temple of Abu ===
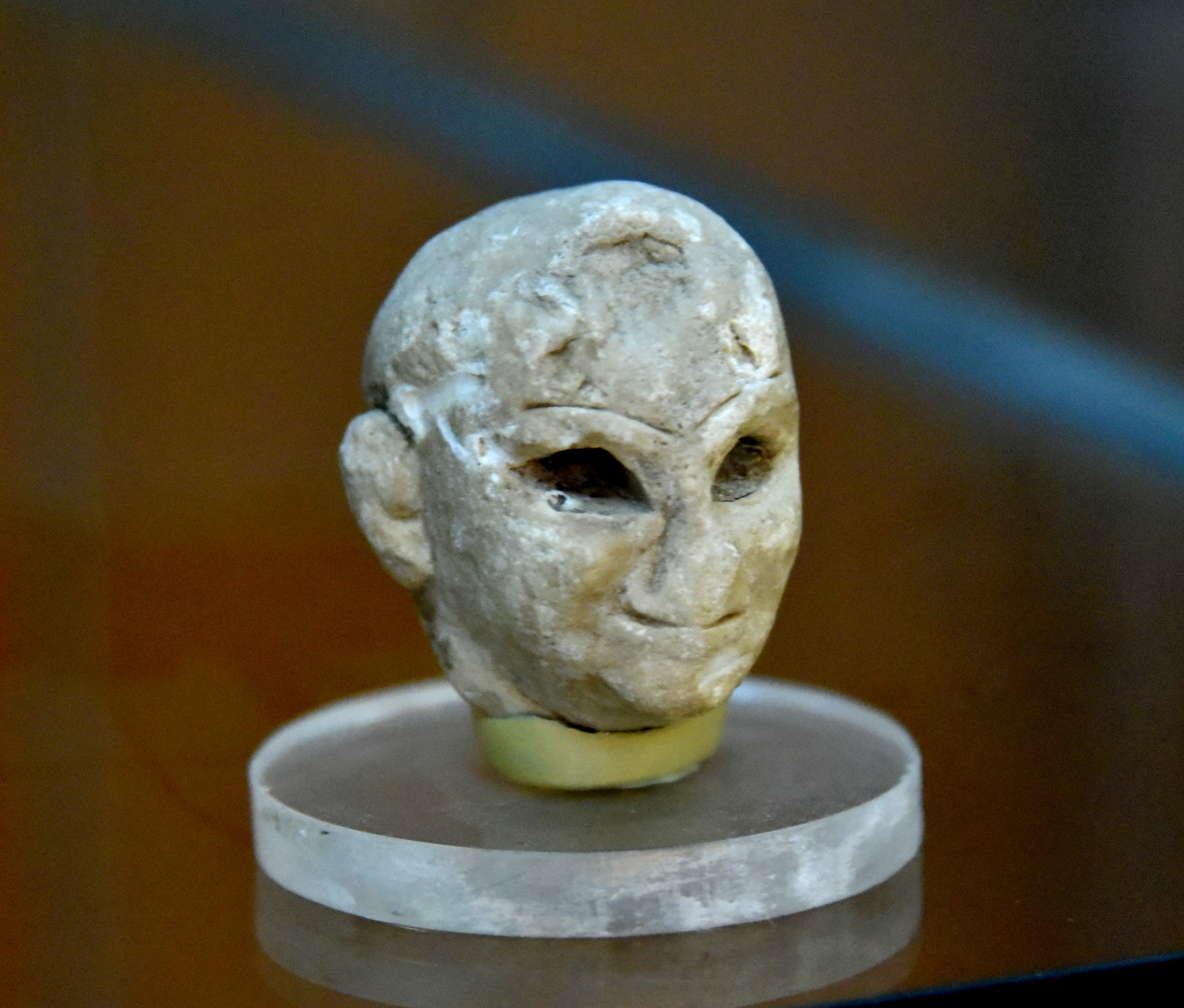
Head of a statue from Tell Asmar, excavated by the Oriental Institute in 1933. The Sulaymaniyah Museum

During the Early Dynastic period, the Abu Temple at Tell Asmar (Eshnunna) went through a number of phases. This included the Early Dynastic Archaic Shrine, Square Temple, and Single-Shrine phases of construction. They, along with sculpture found there, helped form the basis for the three part archaeological separation of the Early Dynastic period into ED I, ED II, and ED III for the ancient Near East. A cache of 12 gypsum temple sculptures, in a geometric style, were found in the Square Temple; these are known as the Tell Asmar Hoard. They are some of the best known examples of ancient Near East sculpture. The group, now split up, show gods, priests and donor worshipers at different sizes, but all in the same highly simplified style. All have greatly enlarged inlaid eyes, but the tallest figure, the main cult image depicting the local god, has enormous eyes that give it a "fierce power". Four of the statues are held at the Oriental Institute Museum of the University of Chicago, one at the Metropolitan Museum of Art and the remaining seven at the Iraq Museum in Baghdad. The original excavators proposed that the temple was solely dedicated to the god Ningishzida. It has since been suggested that the minor cult of Inanna and Dumuzi was also worshiped in the Abu Temple.

== Laws of Eshnunna ==
"If a man begat sons, divorced his wife and married another, that man shall be uprooted from the house and property and may go after whom he loves. His wife (on the other hand) she claims the house."

The Laws of Eshnunna consist of two tablets, found at Shaduppum (Tell Harmal) and a fragment found at Tell Haddad, the ancient Mê-Turan. They were written sometime around the reign of king Dadusha of Eshnunna and appear to not be official copies. When the actual laws were composed is unknown. They are similar to the Code of Hammurabi.

== List of rulers ==
Rulers from the Early Dynastic period and governors under the Akkadian empire are currently unknown. Eshnunna was ruled by vassal governors under Ur III for a time, then was independent under its own rulers for several centuries, and finally controlled by vassal governors under Babylon after the city's capture by Hammurabi. Rulership is unknown afterwards though the city did survive at least until the 12th century BC. The following list should not be considered complete:

Portrait or inscription	Ruler	Approx. date and length of reign (Middle Chronology)	Comments, notes, and references for mentions
Ur III period (c. 2119 – c. 2010 BC)
	Urguedinna	fl. c. 2065 BC	Held the title of, "Governor"; temp. of Shulgi
	Bamu	Uncertain	Held the title of, "Governor"; temp. of Shulgi
	Kallamu	Uncertain	Held the title of, "Governor"; temp. of Shulgi
	Lugal-Kuzu	Uncertain	Held the title of, "Governor"; temp. of Shulgi
	Ituria	fl. c. 2030 BC	Known only from a Shu-Sin temple dedication; Held the title of, "Governor"
	^{D}Shu-iliya	reigned c. 2026 BC	Son of Ituria; temp. of and gained independence from Ibbi-Sin; Held the title of, "King"; He self-deified
Portrait or inscription	Ruler	Approx. date and length of reign (MC)	Comments, notes, and references for mentions
Isin-Larsa period (c. 2010 – c. 1765 BC)
	Nurahum	fl. c. 2010 BC	temp. of and installed by Ishbi-Erra as, "Governor" after the defeat of Subartu; Dropped the title of "King" and applied it to the city's tutelary deity (Tishpak)
	Kirikiri	Uncertain (10 years)	temp. of Shu-Ilishu; Held the title of, "Governor"; His name was Elamite
	Bilalama 𒉋𒆷𒈠	fl. c. 1981 – c. 1962 BC (20 years)	Son of Kirikiri; temp. of Iddin-Dagan; Held the title of "Governor"; His daughter (ME-ku-bi) married Tan-Ruhuratir of Elam
	Isharramashu	Uncertain	Held the title of "Governor"
	Usur-awassu	fl. c. 1940 BC	Held the title of "Governor"
	Anum-muttabil	fl. c. 1932 BC	Originally from Der
	Abimadar	Uncertain	Held the title of "Governor"
	Azuzum	Uncertain	temp. of Lipit-Ishtar; Held the title of "Governor"
	Ur-Ninmar or Ur-Ninmarki	Uncertain	Held the title of "Governor"
	Urn-ningiszida	Uncertain	Held the title of "Governor"
	Ipiq-Adad I	fl. c. 1900 BC	Son of Ur-Ninmar; temp. of Ur-Ninurta; Held the title of "Governor"
	Sarrija	Uncertain	Held the title of "Governor"
	Warassa	Uncertain	Son of Sarrija; temp. of Enlil-bani; Held the title of "Governor"; Gained control of Ishur and Tutub
	Belakum	Uncertain	Son of Sarrija; temp. of Erra-imitti; Held the title of "Governor"; Gained control of Nerebtum
	Ibal-pi-El I	fl. c. 1870 BC (10 years)	temp. of Zambiya; Held the title of "Governor"; Recorded building a throne "inlaid with gold and Meluhha pearls".
	^{D}Ipiq-adad II	r. c. 1862 BC (37 years)	Son of Ibal-pi-El I; temp. of Sumu-la-El; Held the title of "King of the Universe"; He was deified; Defeated the Elamites during his fourth year; He oversaw a large expansion of Eshnunna's territory conquering out to Rapiqum, Suhum, Me-Turan, and Arrapḫa
	^{D}Naram-Suen	d. c. 1816 BC (9 years)	Son of Ipiq-adad II; temp. of Silli-Adad; Held the title of "King of the Universe"; He was deified
	Dannum-tahaz	r. c. 1797 BC	Son of Naram-Suen (?); Held the title of "King"
	Ibni-Erra	Uncertain	Held the title of "King"
	Iqishi-Tishpak	Uncertain	Son of Ibni-Erra; Held the title of "Governor"; Descendant of Naram-Suen (?)
	Ibbi-Suen	Uncertain	Held the title of "King"
	Dadusha	r. c. 1790 BC (10 years)	Son of Ipiq-adad II; Held the title of "King of the Universe"; temp. of Shamshi-Adad I
	Ibal-pi-el II	r. c. 1779 – c. 1765 BC (14 years)	Son of Dadusha; temp. of Zimri-Lim; Killed by Siwe-Palar-Khuppak who captured Eshnunna, in 5th year of reign Shamshi-Adad I dies
Portrait or inscription	Ruler	Approx. date and length of reign (MC)	Comments, notes, and references for mentions
Old Babylonian period (c. 1765 – c. 1595 BC)
	Silli-Sin	r. c. 1764 – c. 1756 BC	temp. of Hammurabi; Held the title of "King"; Treaty with Hammurabi, in year 4 of reign married daughter of Hammurabi
	Lipissa (Lipit-Sin)		
	Iluni	c. 1749-1729 BC (c. 20 years)	temp. of Samsu-iluna

== Excavation photographs ==
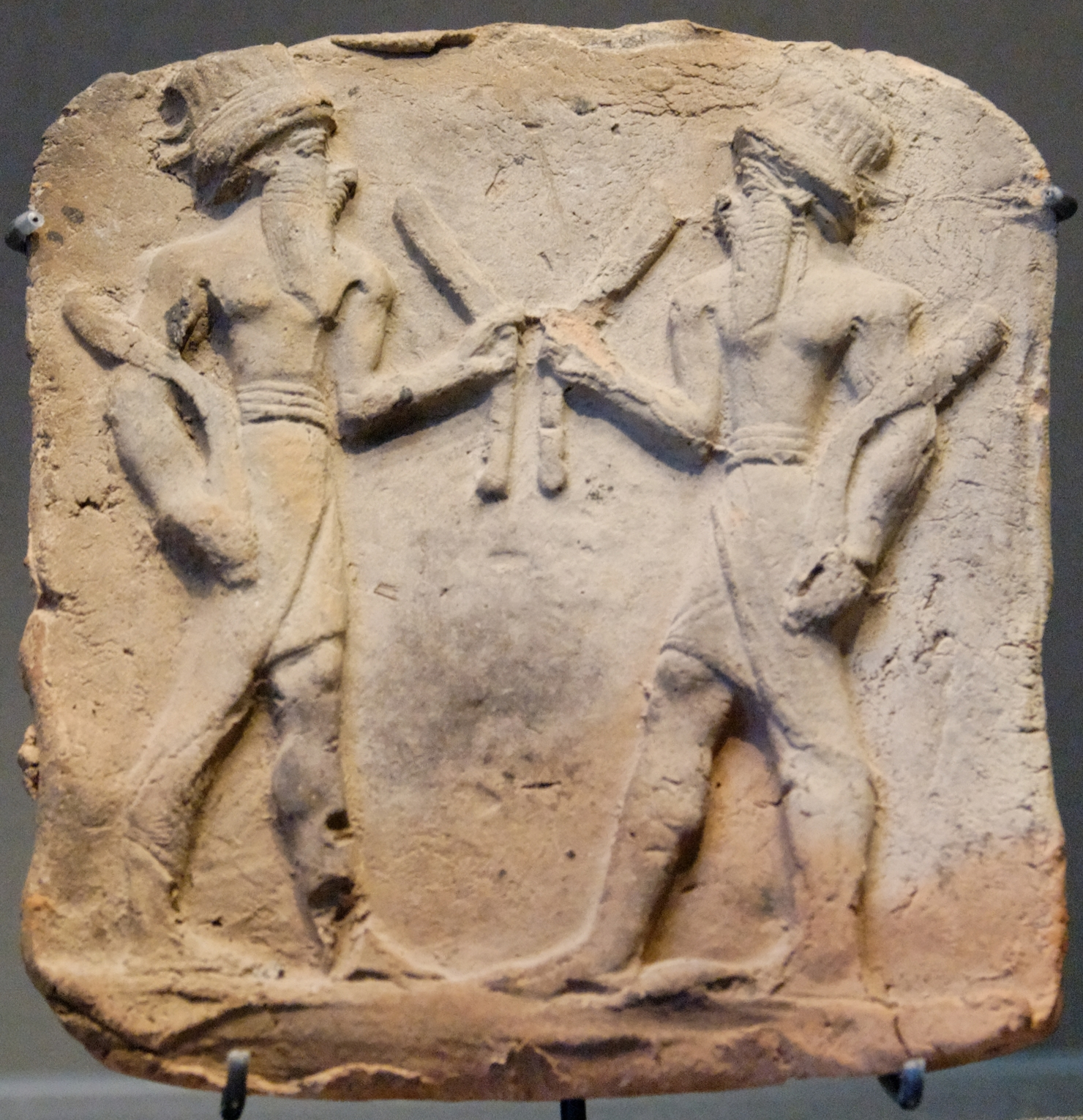
Dancers Eshnunna Louvre

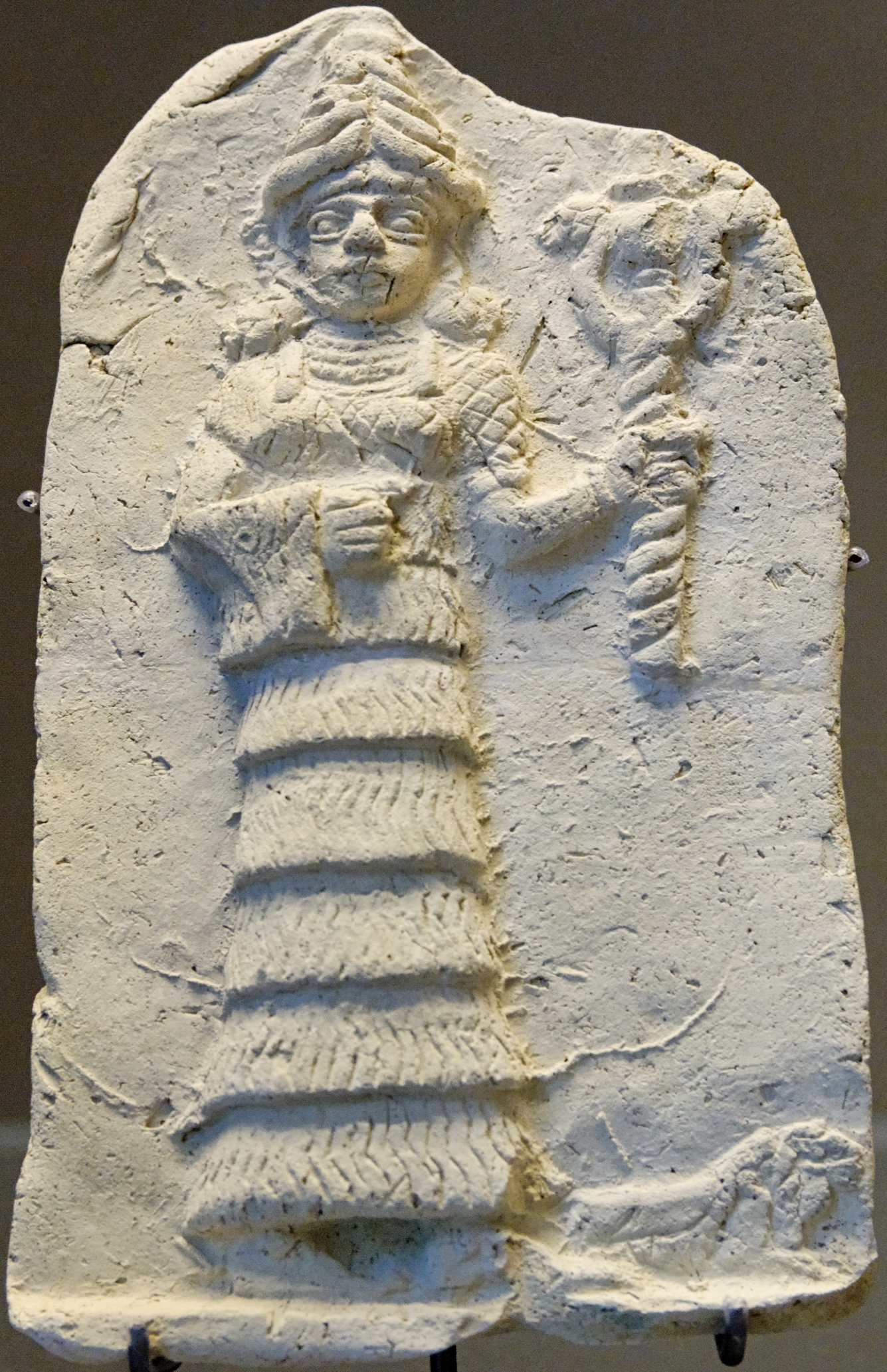
Plaque of Ishtar from Eshnunna

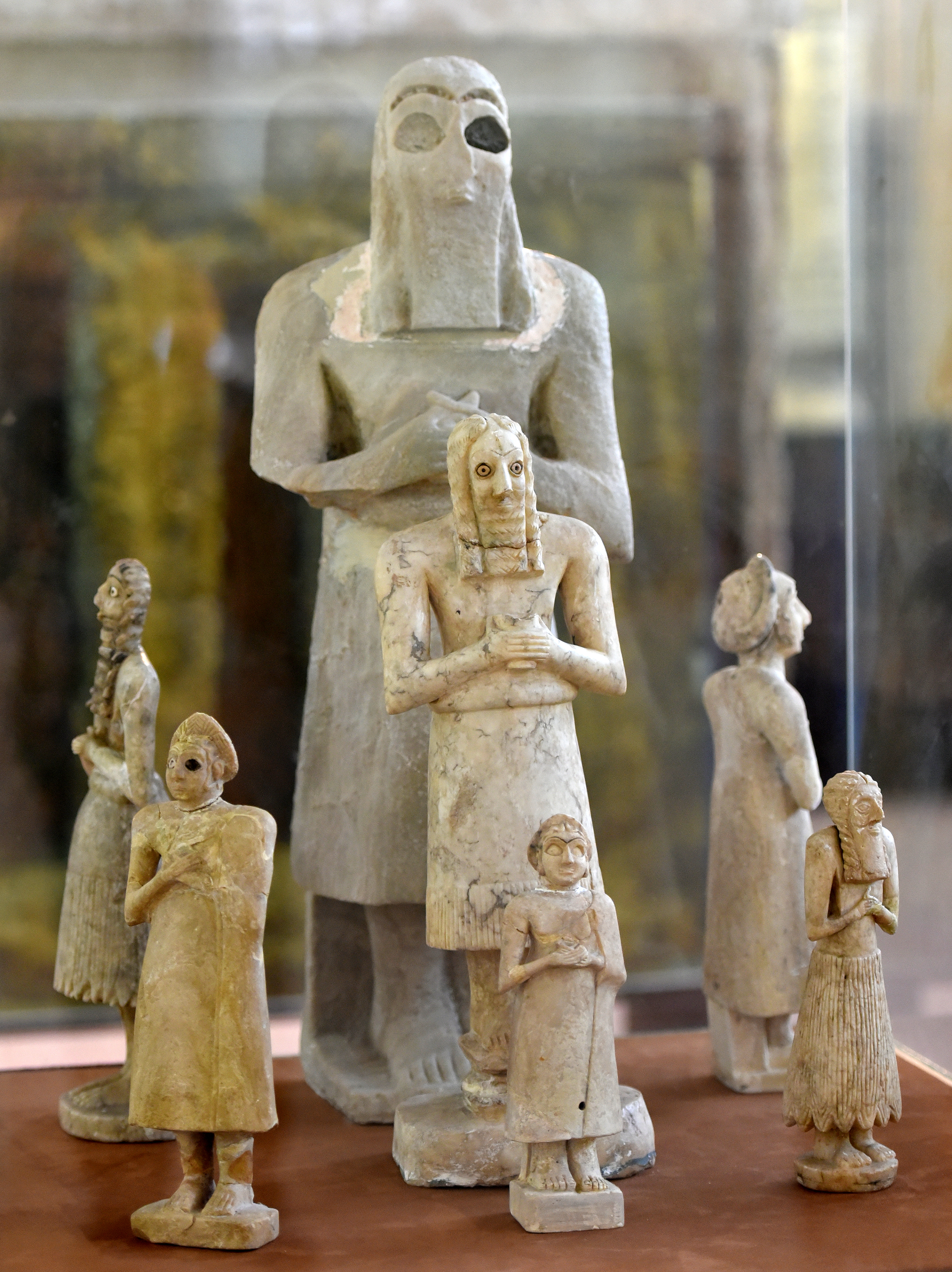
Sumerian Statues from Eshnunna and Khafajah

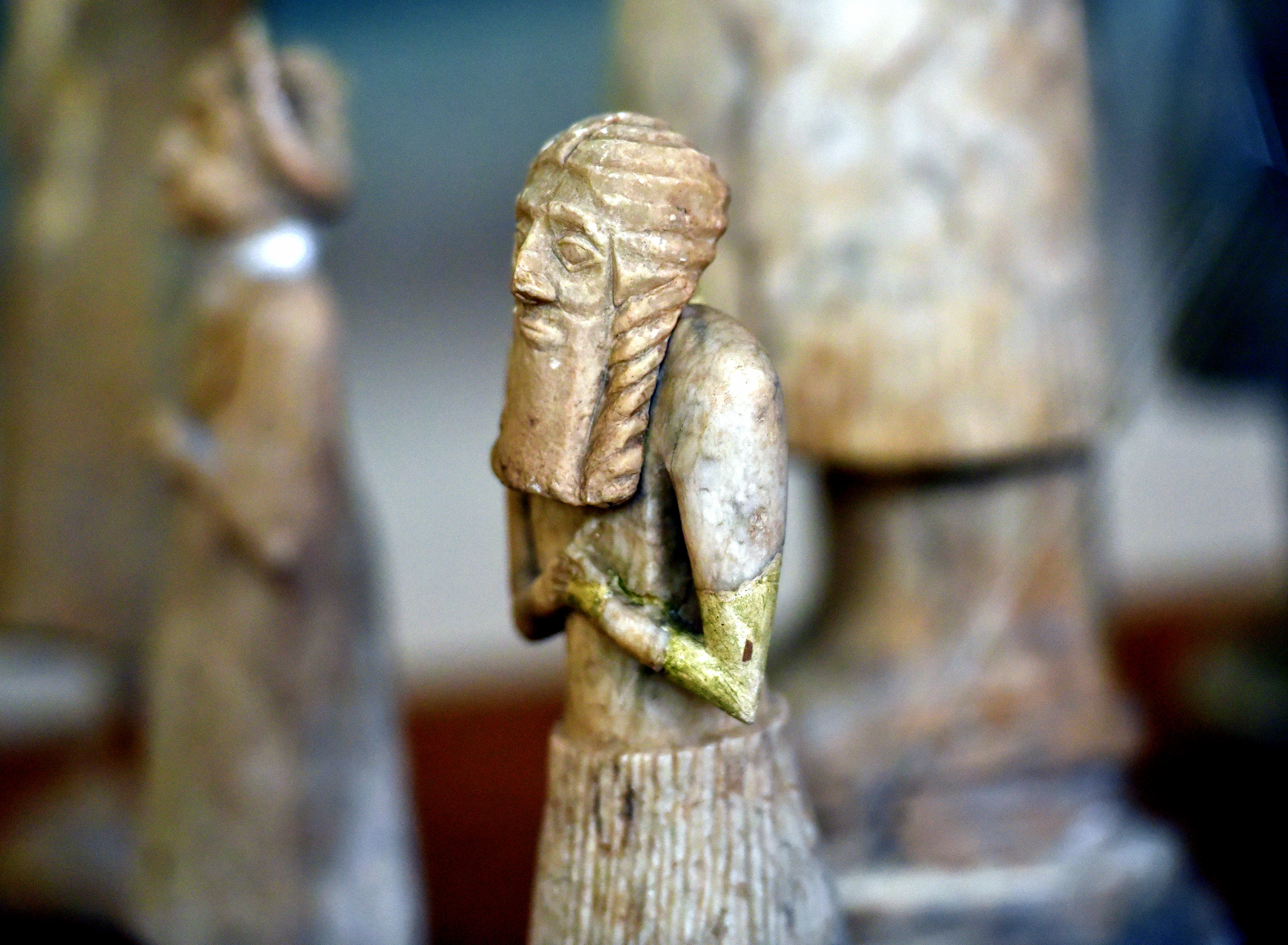
Statuette of male worshiper from Tell Asmar – Early Dynastic period 2600–2350 BC

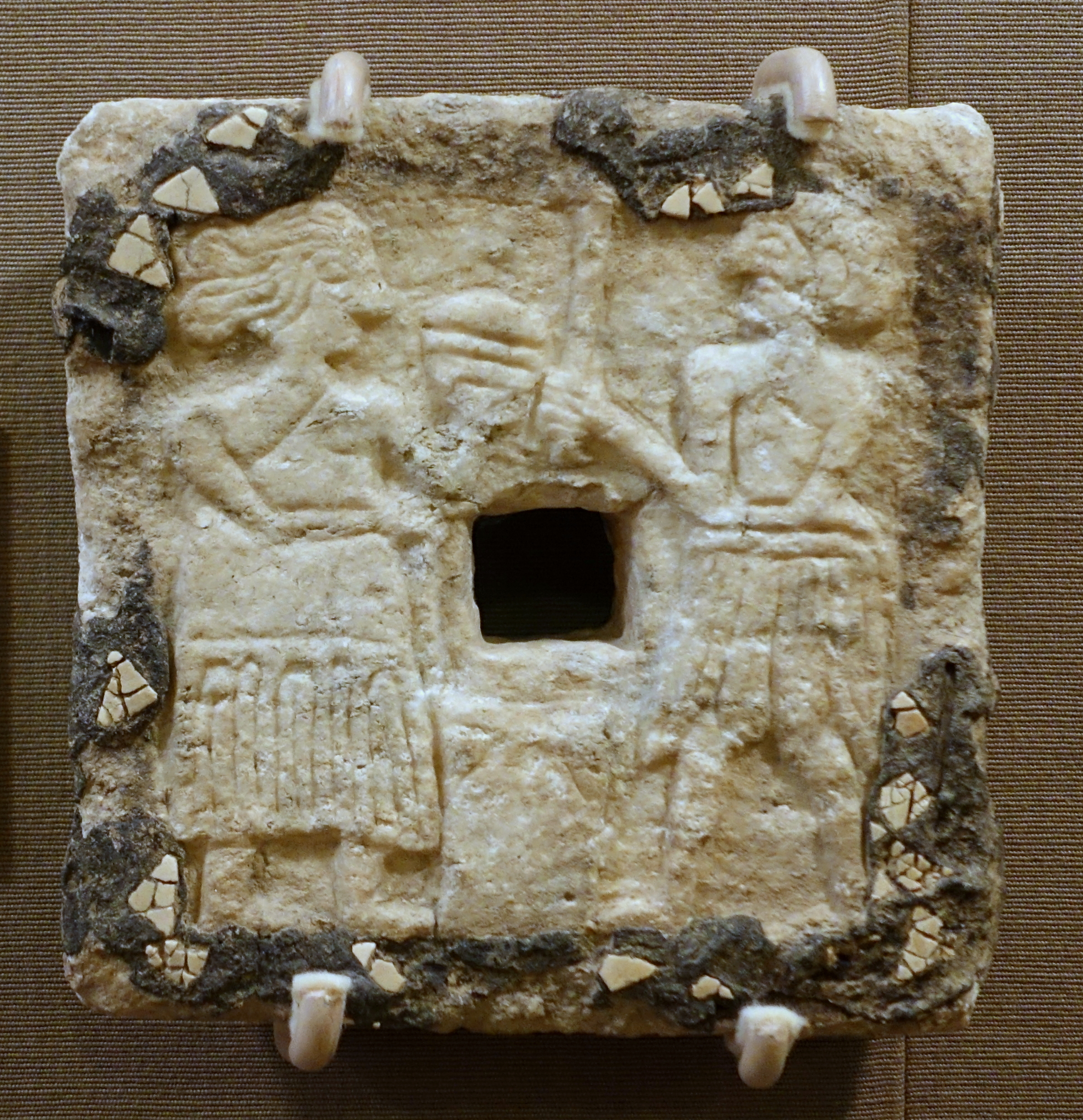
Plaque_with_female_and_male_figures, Tell Asmar Single-Shrine Temple III – Early Dynastic period, 2500–2330 BC, alabaster, shell and bitumen

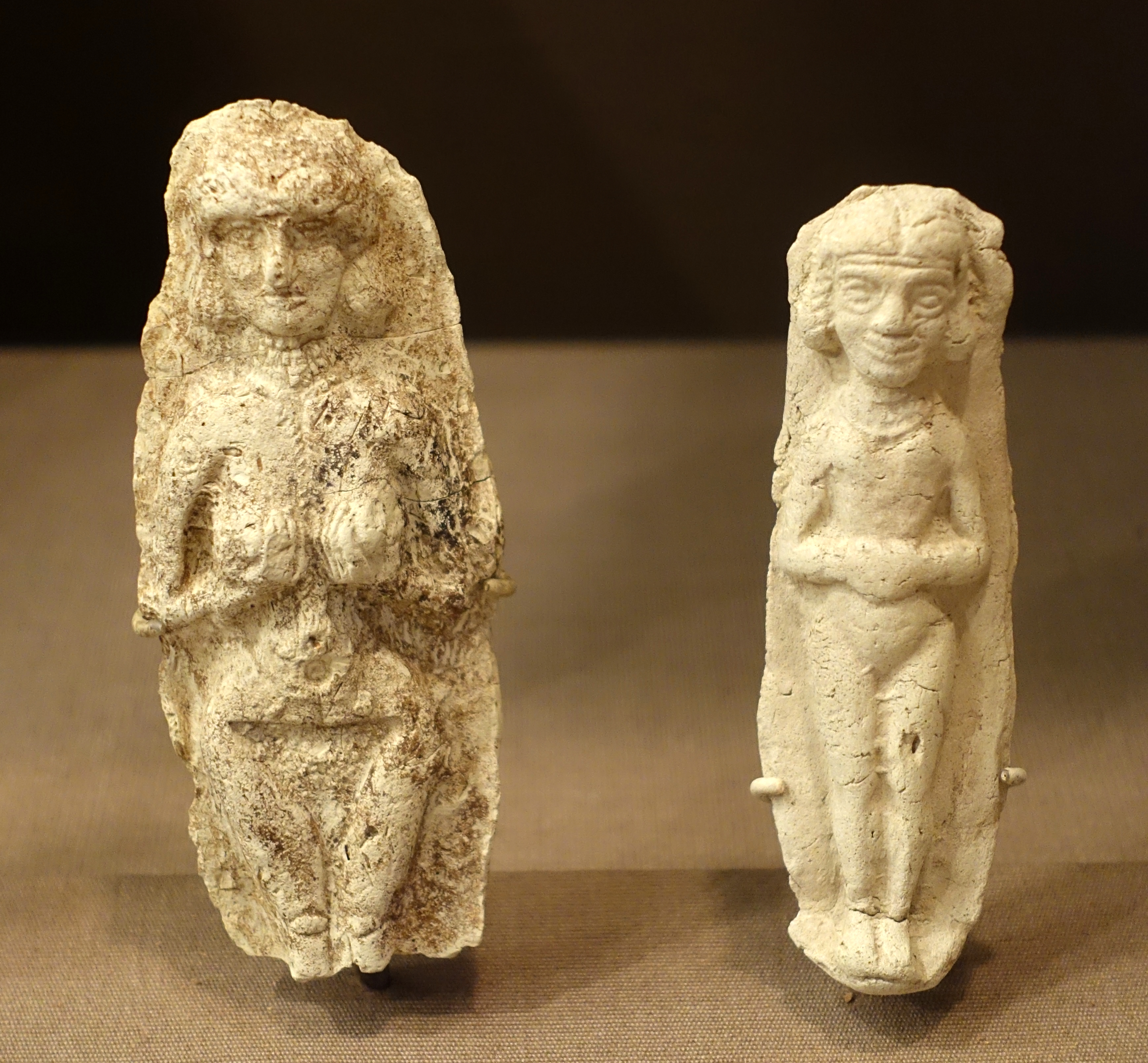
Plaques with nude females from Tell Asmar, baked clay, (left)_city wall area, Isin-Larsa period, 2000–1800 BC, (right) Ishchali, 2000-1600 BC

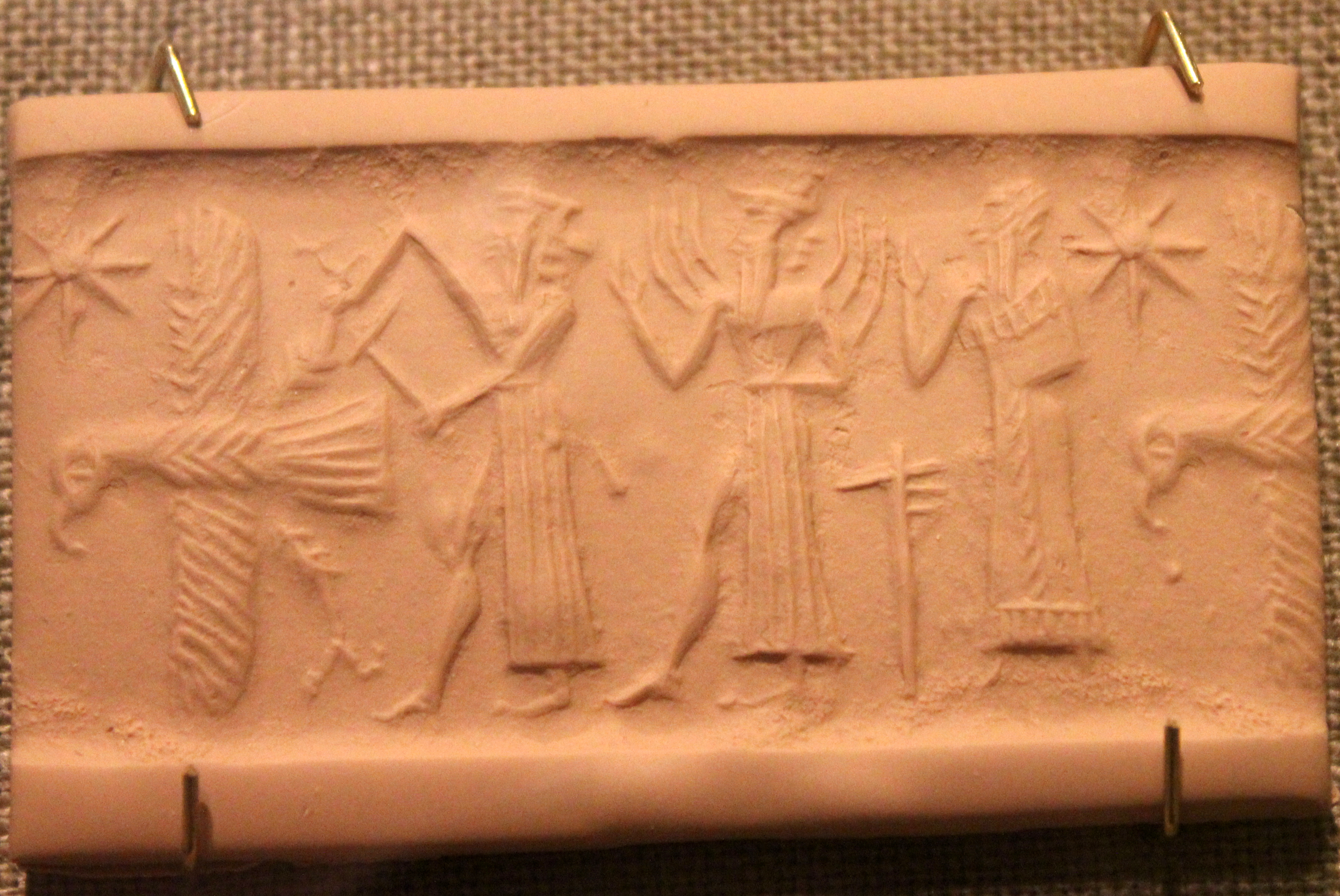
God with ax attacks eagle while Shamash and Worshipper stand behind

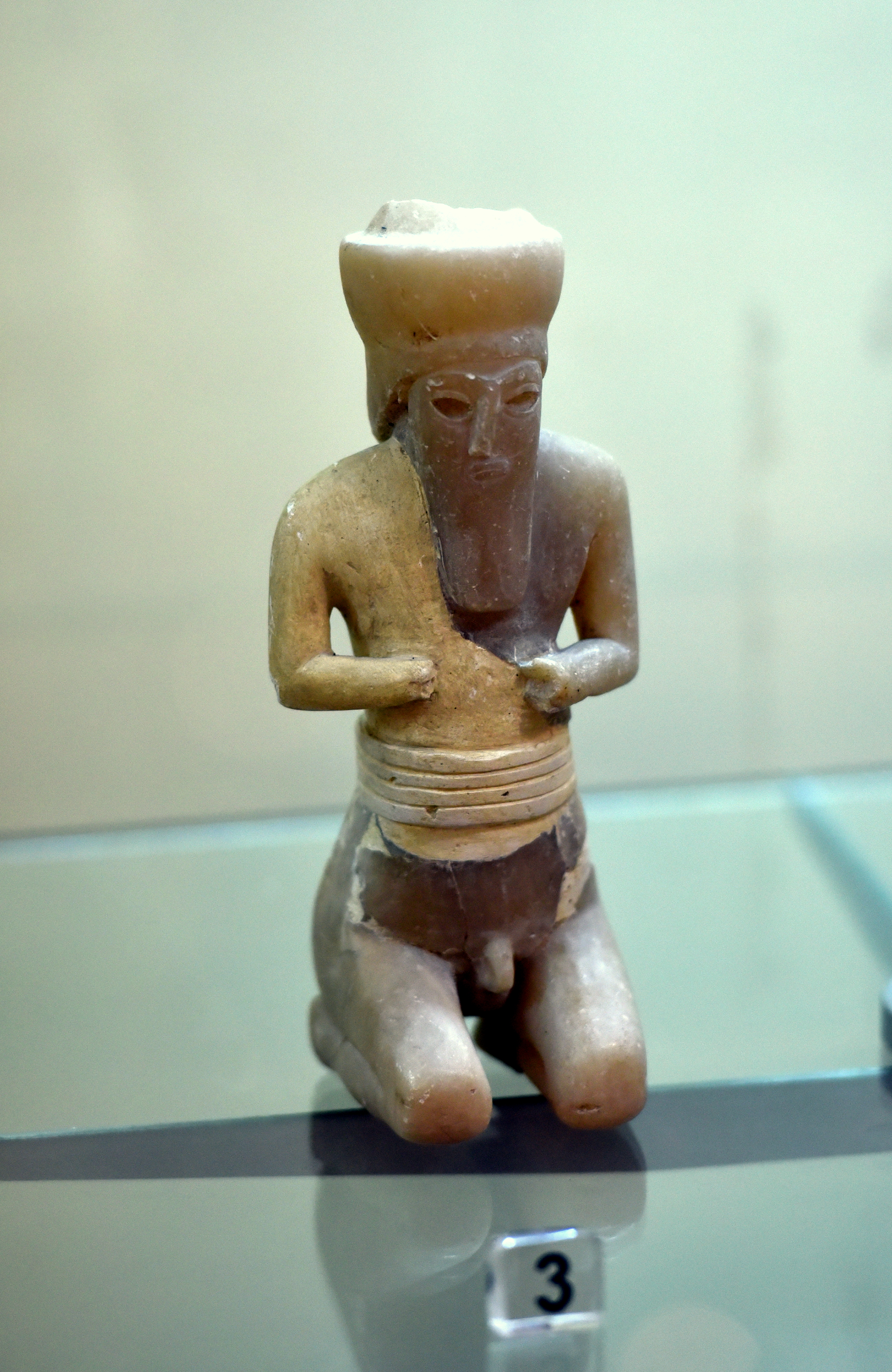
Statue of a Sumerian seated worshiper from Tell Asmar

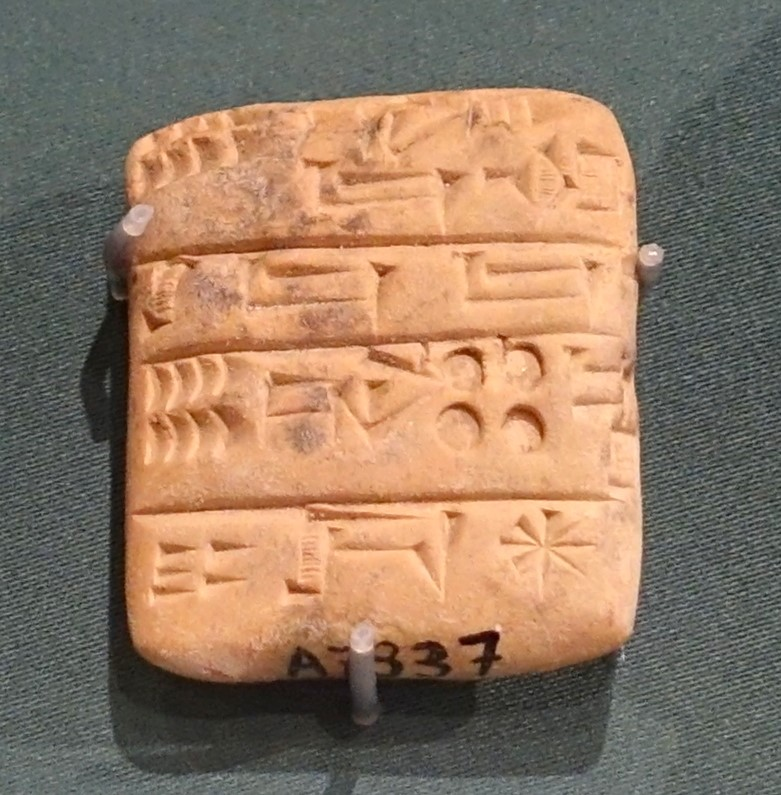
Administrative tablet – Akkadian period

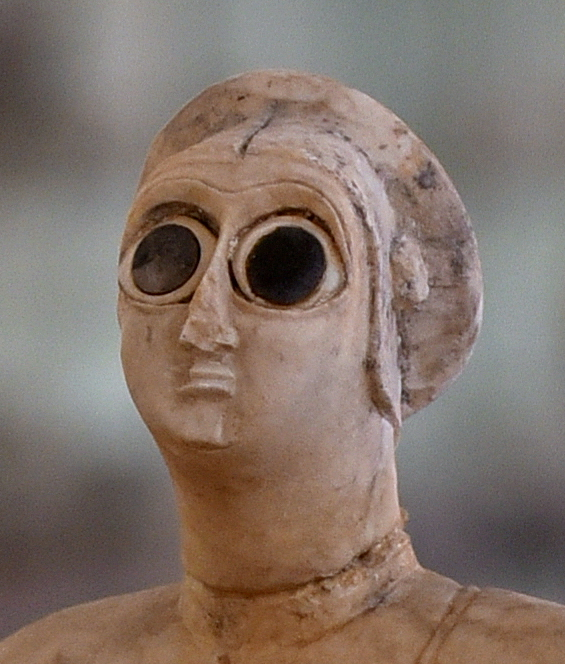
Sumerian Status from Tell Asmar – part of Tell Asmar Hoard

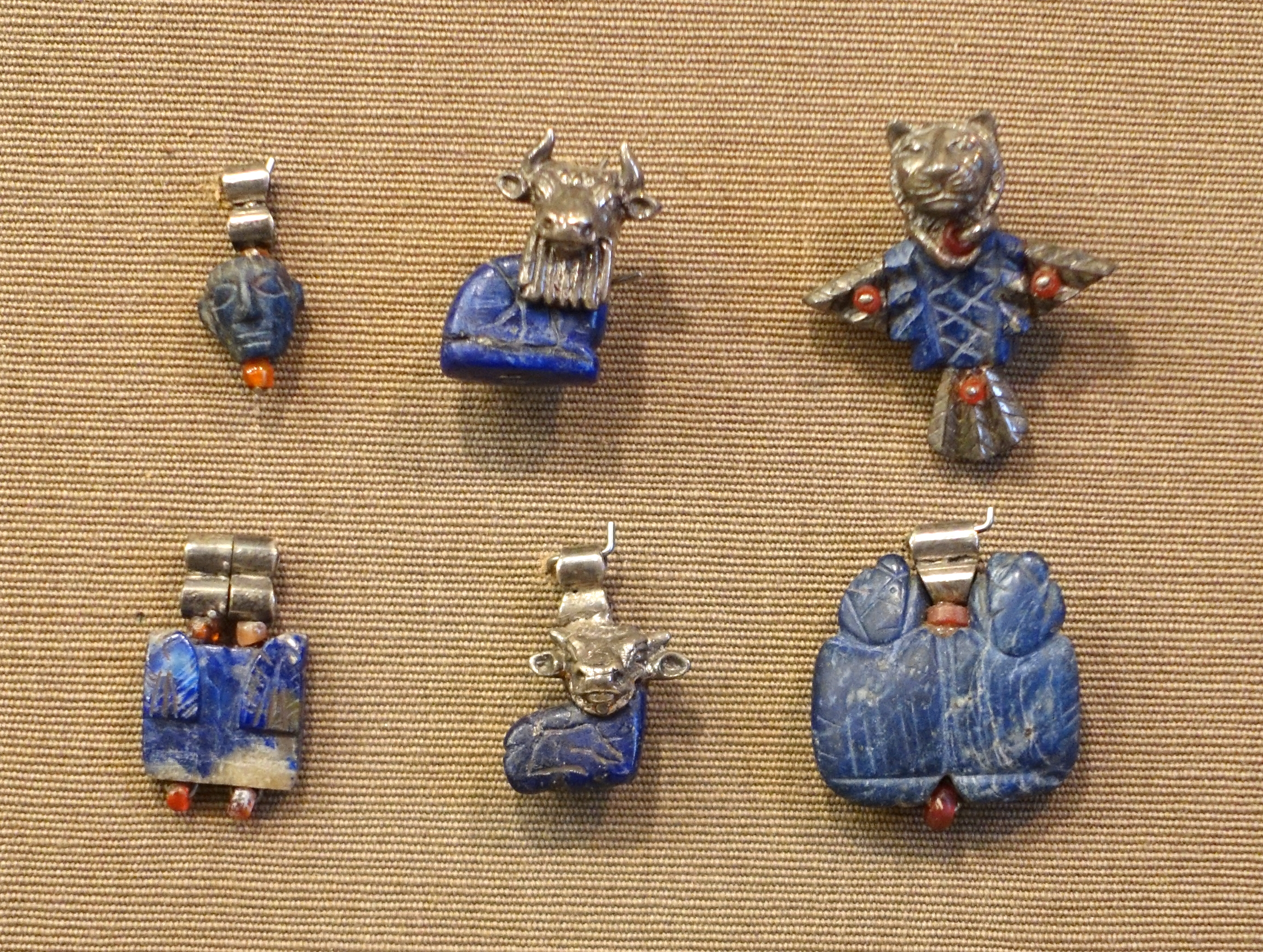
Pendants from Tell Asmar North Palace – Early Dynastic period – lapis lazuli, silver, and carnelian

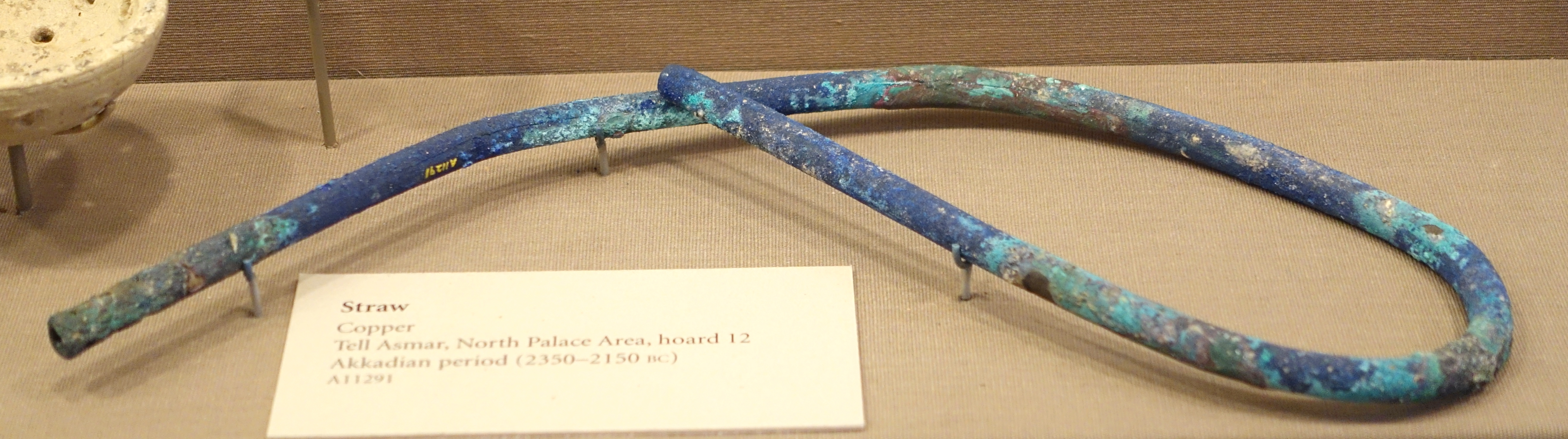
Copper Straw from Tell Asmar North Palace Area – Akkadian period

== See also ==
- Andarig
- Chogha Gavaneh
- Chronology of the ancient Near East
- Khafajah
- List of cities of the ancient Near East
- Tell Ishchali

== Sources ==
- Charpin, Dominique; Ziegler, Nele (2003). Mari et le Proche-Orient à l'époque amorrite. Essai d'histoire politique. Floregium Marianum. Vol. 5. Société pour l'étude du Proche-Orient Ancien.
- Charpin, Dominique; Edzard, Dietz Otto; Stol, Marten (2004). "Mesopotamien: Die altbabylonische Zeit". Orbis Biblicus et Orientalis. 160/4. doi:10.5167/uzh-151595.
- Charpin, Dominique (2018). "Old Babylonian Eshnunna: a historiographical case". In Gonçalves, Carlos; Michel, Cécile (eds.). Interdisciplinary research on the Bronze Age Diyala.
- Durand, Jean-Marie (1997). Les documents épistolaires du palais de Mari. Tome I (in French). Cerf. ISBN 978-2204056854.
- Durand, Jean-Marie (1998). Les documents épistolaires du Palais de Mari. Tome II (in French). Cerf. ISBN 978-2204059619.
- Durand, Jean-Marie (1 January 2013). "La «suprématie Élamite» sur les Amorrites. Réexamen, vingt ans après la XXXVI e RAI (1989)". In De Graef, Katrien; Tavernier, Jan (eds.). Susa and Elam. Archaeological, Philological, Historical and Geographical Perspectives. Brill. pp. 329–339. doi:10.1163/9789004207417_019. ISBN 978-90-04-20741-7.
- de Boer, Rients (2014b). "Notes on an early OB treaty between Larsa, Uruk, and Ešnunna" (PDF). N.A.B.U- Nouvelles Assyriologiques Brèves et Utilitaires: 124–127.
- De Graef, Katrien (2022). "The Middle East after the Fall of Ur: From Ešnunna and the Zagros to Susa". In Radner, Karen; Moeller, Nadeen; Potts, D.T. (eds.). The Oxford History of the Ancient Near East: Volume II: From the End of the Third Millennium BC to the Fall of Babylon. Oxford Academic. pp. 408–496. doi:10.1093/oso/9780190687571.003.0016.
- Guichard, Michaël (2002). "Les Relations Diplomatiques Entre Ibal-Pi-El Ii Et Zimri-Lim: Deux Étapes Vers La Discorde". Revue d'Assyriologie et d'archéologie orientale. 96 (2): 109–142. doi:10.3917/assy.096.0109. ISSN 0373-6032. JSTOR 23281220.
- Guichard, Michaël (2014). "Un traité d'alliance entre Larsa, Uruk et Ešnunna contre Sabium de Babylone". Semitica. 56: 9–34.
- Heimpel, Wolfgang (2003). Letters to the King of Mari: A New Translation, with Historical Introduction, Notes, and Commentary. Eisenbrauns. ISBN 978-1-57506-080-4.
- Lacambre, Denis (1 March 2002). "Études sur le règne de Zimrî-Lîm de Mari". Revue d'assyriologie et d'archéologie orientale. 95 (1): 1–21. doi:10.3917/assy.095.0001.
- Lacambre, Denis; van Koppen, Frans (1 January 2009). "Sippar and the Frontier between Ešnunna and Babylon. New Sources for the History of Ešnunna in the Old Babylonian Period". Jaarbericht van het Vooraziatisch-Egyptisch Genootschap Ex Oriente Lux, Vol. 41, 2008-2009, P. 151-177.
- Michalowski, Piotr (1 January 2019). "Memories of Rim-Sin II". In Guichard, M.; Langlois, A.I. (eds.). De l'argile au numérique. Mélanges assyriologiques en l'honneur de Dominique Charpin. pp. 669–692.
- Nahm, Werner (2017). "A date list for Ipiq-Adad III?" (PDF). N.A.B.U- Nouvelles Assyriologiques Brèves et Utilitaires: 175–176.
- Pongratz-Leisten, Beate (25 September 2015). Religion and Ideology in Assyria. Walter de Gruyter GmbH & Co KG. ISBN 978-1-61451-426-8.
- Potts, D. T. (12 November 2015). The Archaeology of Elam: Formation and Transformation of an Ancient Iranian State 2nd ed. Cambridge University Press. ISBN 978-1-316-58631-0.
- Reichel, Clemens (1 January 2018). "Centre and Periphery—the Role of the 'Palace of the Rulers' at Tell Asmar in the History of Ešnunna (2,100 –1,750 BCE)". Journal of the Canadian Society for Mesopotamian Studies.
- Sasson, Jack M. (1995). "Water beneath Straw. Adventures of a Prophetic Phrase in the Mari Archives" (PDF). Fs Greenfield: 599.
- Sasson, Jack M. (2015). From the Mari Archives: An Anthology of Old Babylonian Letters. Penn State Press. ISBN 9781575063768.
- Van De Mieroop, Marc (30 April 2008). King Hammurabi of Babylon: A Biography. John Wiley & Sons. ISBN 978-0-470-69534-0.
- Wasserman, Nathan; Bloch, Yigal (24 July 2023). "The Amorites: A Political History of Mesopotamia in the Early Second Millennium BCE". The Amorites. Brill. ISBN 978-90-04-54731-5.
