= Samsu-iluna =

Samsu-iluna 𒊓𒄠𒋢𒄿𒇻𒈾

King of Babylon
- Reign: c. 1749 - c. 1712 BC
- Predecessor: Hammurabi
- Successor: Abi-Eshuh
- Born: c. 1793 BC
- Died: c. 1712 BC (aged c. 81)
- Issue: Abi-Eshuh
- Father: Hammurabi
- Religion: Ancient Mesopotamian religion

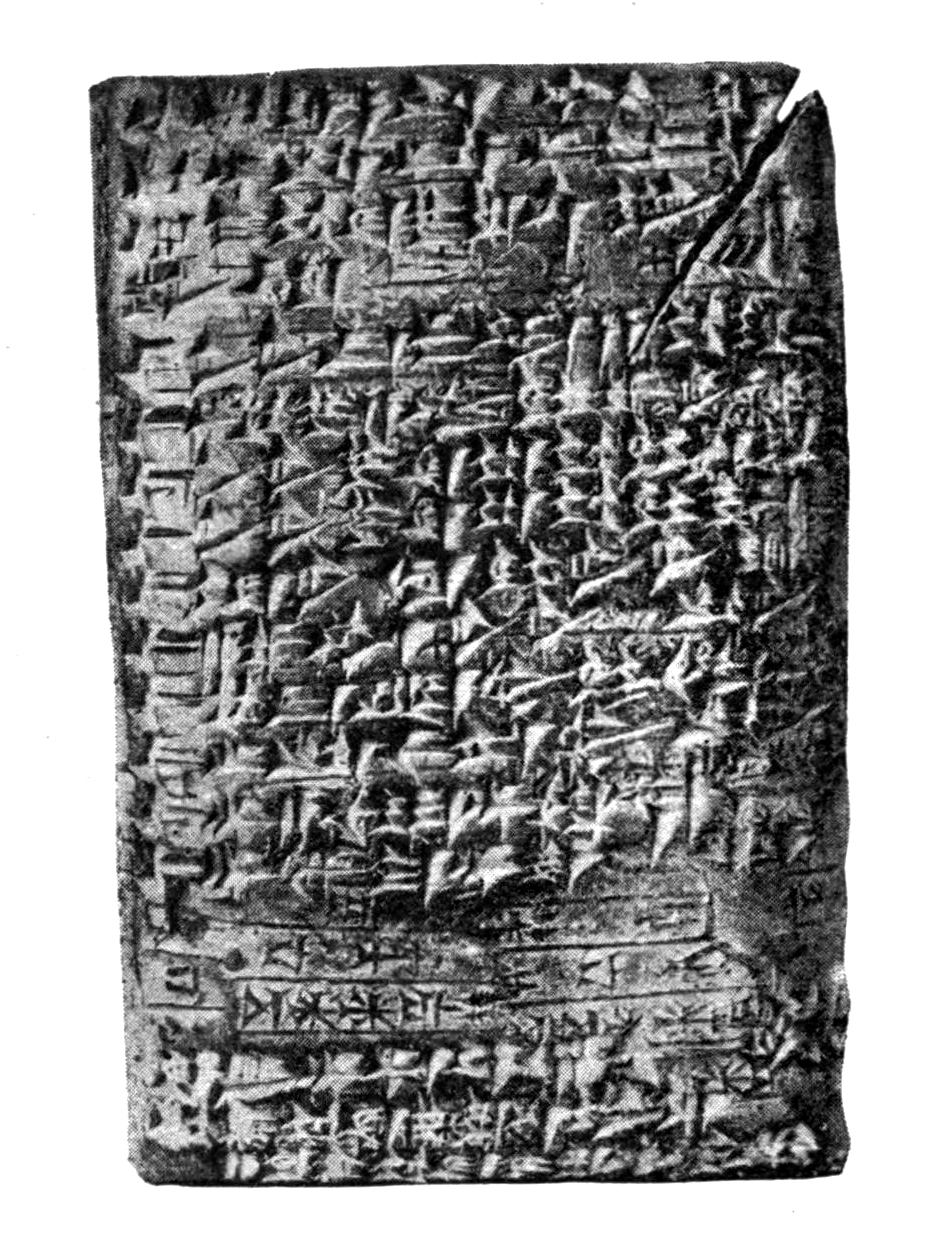
Record of the sale of land during the reign of Samsu-Iluna

Samsu-iluna (Amorite: Samsu-iluna or Samsu-ilūna, "The Sun (is) our god"; c. 1793 BC - c. 1712 BC) was the 7th king of the founding Amorite dynasty of Babylon. His reign is estimated from 1749 BC to 1712 BC (middle chronology), or from 1686 to 1648 BC (short chronology). He was the son and successor of Hammurabi. His reign was marked by the violent uprisings of areas conquered by his father and the abandonment of several important cities primarily in Sumer. A number of letters sent by Samsu-iluna have been found of which 20 have been published. One is addressed to Abban the king of Aleppo. No received letters have been found due to the modern high water table at Babylon.

== Circumstances of Samsu-iluna's reign ==
When Hammurabi rose to power in the city of Babylon, he controlled a small region directly around that city, and was surrounded by vastly more powerful opponents on all sides. By the time he died, he had conquered Sumer, Eshnunna, and Mari, and reduced Assyria to vassal status, making himself master of Mesopotamia. He had also significantly weakened and humiliated Elam and the Gutians.

While defeated, however, these states were not destroyed; if Hammurabi had a plan for welding them to Babylon he did not live long enough to see it through. Within a few years after his death, Elam and Assyria had left from Babylon's orbit and revolutions had started in all the conquered territories. The task of dealing with these troubles—and others—fell to Samsu-iluna. Though he campaigned tirelessly and seems to have won frequently, the king proved unable to stop the empire's unwinding. Through it all, however, he did manage to keep the core of his kingdom intact, and this allowed the city of Babylon to cement its position in history.

== Fragmentation of the Empire ==
Map showing the Babylonian territory upon Hammurabi's ascension in c. 1792 BC and upon his death in c. 1750 BC

In the 9th year of Samsu-iluna's reign a man calling himself Rim-sin (known in the literature as Rim-Sîn II, and thought to perhaps be a nephew of the Rim-sin who opposed Hammurabi) raised a rebellion against Babylonian authority in Larsa which spread to include some 26 cities, among them Uruk, Ur, Isin, and Kisurra in the south, and Eshnunna in the north. There is a statue inscription of Samsu-iluna which describes some of this conflict.

Samsu-iluna seems to have had the upper-hand militarily. Within a year he dealt the coalition a shattering blow which took the northern cities out of the fight. (Note: An inscription commemorates the defeat of “26 usurping kings”.) In the aftermath, the king of Eshnunna, Ilūni, was dragged to Babylon and executed by strangulation. Over the course of the next 4 years, Samsu-iluna's armies tangled with Rim-sin's forces up and down the borderlands between Babylon, Sumer, and Elam. Eventually, Samsu-iluna attacked Ur, pulled down its walls and put the city to the sack, he then did the same to Uruk, and Isin as well. (Note: This was in year 15 of his reign, possibly too late to have resulted from Rim-sin's rebellion.) Finally, Larsa itself was defeated and Rim-sin II was killed, thus ending the struggle.

A few years later, a pretender calling himself Ilum-ma-ili, and claiming descent from the last king of Isin, raised another pan-Sumerian revolt. Samsu-iluna marched an army to Sumer, and the two met in a battle which proved indecisive; a second battle sometime later went Ilum-ma-ili's way, and in its aftermath, he founded the First Dynasty of Sea-Land, (Note: The actual dates are very uncertain, but they oscillate between the 18th and 29th year of Samsu-iluna's reign.) which would remain in control of Sumer for the next 300 years. Samsu-iluna seems to have taken a defensive approach after this; in the 18th year of his reign, he saw to the rebuilding of 6 fortresses in the vicinity of Nippur which might have been intended to keep that city under Babylonian control. Ultimately, this proved fruitless; by the time of Samsu-iluna's death, Nippur recognized Ilum-ma-ili as king.

Apparently, Eshnunna had not reconciled itself to Babylonian control either, because in Samsu-iluna's 20th year it rebelled again. Samsu-iluna marched his army through the region and, presumably after some bloodshed, constructed the fortress of Dur-samsuiluna to keep them in line. This seems to have done the trick, as later documents see Samsu-iluna take a more conciliatory stance repairing infrastructure and restoring waterways.

Both Assyria and Elam used the general chaos to re-assert their independence. Kuturnahunte I of Elam, seizing the opportunity left by Samsu-iluna's attack on Uruk, marched into the (now wall-less) city and plundered it. Among the items looted was a statue of Inanna which would not be returned until the reign of Ashurbanipal eleven centuries later. In Assyria, a native vice regent named Puzur-Sin ejected Asinum who had been a vassal king of his fellow Amorite Hammurabi. A native king Ashur-dugul seized the throne, and a period of civil war in Assyria ensued. Samsu-Iluna seems to have been powerless to intervene, and finally a king named Adasi restored a stable native dynasty in Assyria, removing any vestages of Amorite-Babylonian influence.

In the end, Samsu-iluna was left with a kingdom that was only fractionally larger than the one he started out with (but which did leave him mastery of the Euphrates River up to and including the ruins of Mari and its dependencies). (Note: Sources seem to agree that Mari remained in Babylonian hands, although a less recent, obscure, partial inscription from the end of Samsu-ilana's reign remarking on a “host of the Westland” is a possible reference to the loss even of Mari.) The status of Eshnunna is difficult to determine with any accuracy, and while it may have remained in Babylonian hands the city was exhausted and its political influence at an end.

== Depopulation of Sumer ==
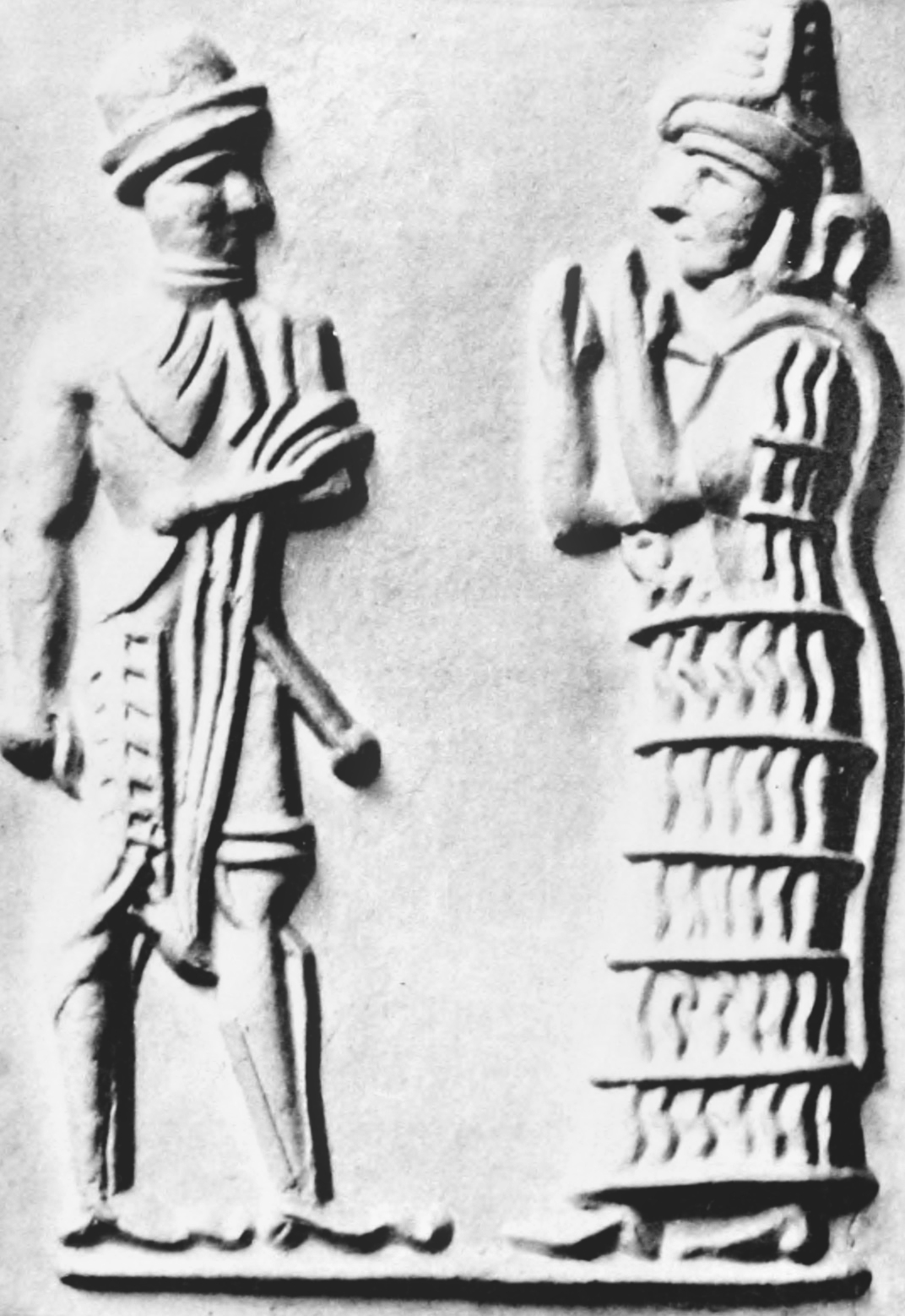
Dakiya, a high official of Samsu-iluna, and son of Damiq-ilishu, the last king of the Isin Dynasty

Samsu-iluna's campaigns might not have been solely responsible for the havoc wreaked upon Uruk and Ur, and his loss of Sumer might have been as much a calculated retreat as defeat.

Records in the cities of Ur and Uruk essentially stop after the 10th year of Samsu-iluna's reign. Their priests apparently continued writing, but from more northerly cities. Larsa's records also end about this time. Records keep going in Nippur and Isin until Samsu-iluna's 29th year, and then cease there as well. These breaks are also observed in the archeological record, where evidence points to these cities being largely or completely abandoned for hundreds of years, until well into the Kassite period.

Reasons for this are hard to come by. Certainly the constant warfare cannot have helped matters, but Samsu-iluna appears to have campaigned just as hard in the north, and that region was thriving during the period. The rise of Babylon marks a definite end to Sumerian cultural dominance of Mesopotamia and a shift to Akkadian for government and popular writing; perhaps people who claimed cultural ties to the Sumerian past retrenched around the southerly cities which Iluna-ilu controlled. Several members of his dynasty took Sumerian names, and it appears they consciously strove to return to the region's Sumerian roots. It is also possible that economic or environmental factors were involved; it is known that both Hammurabi and Rim-sin I had instituted policies which altered the economies of the region. These may have proven unsustainable in the long-term.

== Other campaigns ==
- Slaving raids by Sutean tribes appear to have been a constant problem for Babylon during this period, and Samsu-iluna spent some time dealing with them. He promulgated a law barring Babylonian citizens from purchasing as slaves citizens of the (presumably oft-raided) cities of Idamaras and Arrapḫa.
- In the 9th year of his reign, Samsu-iluna turned back an invasion by a Kassite army. This is the earliest known mention of the Kassites, who would go on to rule Babylonia after the collapse of the Amorite dynasty.
- Around the 24th year of his reign, Samsu-iluna attacked and destroyed the city of Apum, killing its king Yakun-ashar. A year later he seems to have attacked the city of Terqa as well, possibly adding it to his kingdom.
- In his 28th year, Samsu-iluna defeated the armies of two otherwise unknown western kings recorded as Iadikhabum and Muti-kurshana.
- In the 35th year of his reign, Samsu-iluna repelled an Amorite invasion.

== Religious and Astronomical achievements ==
Though troubled, Samsu-iluna's reign was not entirely focused on war. He is known to have rebuilt the walls of Kish, Nippur and Sippar for example, and to have propagated the Marduk cult as had his father. He also apparently restored the E-babbar temple of Shamash (Also known as Utu) in Larsa, ziggurats at Sippar, and the ziggurat of Zababa and Ishtar at Kish.

Additionally, there is speculation that Samsu-iluna instituted the Standard Babylonian calendar, possibly as a means of tying his empire more closely together.

== Family ==
Samsu-iluna had at least one attested child:

- Abi-Eshuh: his successor
- Iltani: devotee (nadītum) of Šamaš, probably this king’s daughter

== See also ==
- List of Kings of Babylon
- Babylonian law
- Babylonian calendar
- Short chronology timeline
- History of Sumer
- Mesopotamia
- Mashkan-shapir

== Footnotes ==
Preceded by Hammurabi	King of Babylon c. 1750 - c. 1712 BC	Succeeded by Abi-Eshuh
