= Emutbal =

Emutbal or Yamutbal (Note: "Yamut" and "bal" were the names of Amorite deities.) was the name of a tribe or a region in ancient Mesopotamia, located to the east of the Tigris, stretching from the ancient city of Šar-Sin to Marud. In 1834 B.C.E. Kudur-Mabuk, the Amorite chieftain, held control of the land.

From 1786 to 1782 B.C.E., the Babylonian king Hammurabi achieved military successes over Emutbal, finally conquering the land by 1763 B.C.E.
