= Apiak =

Cities of Sumer

Apiak/Api'ak (a-pi-ak^{ki} or a-pi_{5}-ak^{ki}), sited between Kish and Marad to the south. It was active from the late 3rd millennium Akkadian Empire period, through the Ur III period, and Isin-Larsa period before disappearing from history. It is known to have lain, as did Kiritab to the north, on the Abgal Canal which branched off from the Euphrates river south of Kish. After passing Apiak the Abgal Canal continued south to Marad. This territory was controlled for a time by the Manana Dynasty with two year names of ruler Halium mentioning the Abgal. A year name of Marad ruler Sumu-ditan also mentions the Abgal. The "Canal of Me-en-ili" is known to have bordered the Apiak province on the east in Ur III times. A location at the modern town of Fallujah has been suggested. It was speculated at one point, based on a thousand year later Neo-Babylonian text, that the city of Apak was the same city as Apiak and that it was in the vicinity of Babylon (being donated to support the god Bel there). Apak was also mentioned in an annal of Neo-Assyrian ruler Sennacherib.

A god, Ḫuškia (name suggested to mean "Furious one of the netherworld"), associated with Nergal is said to have had a temple at Apiak. A Rubātum is known to have been a nadītu of Nergal at Apiak in the Old Babylonian period.

== History ==
During the Akkadian Empire period a large coalition of city-states led by Iphur-Kis of Kish (Sumer) and Amar-Girid of Uruk, joined by Enlil-nizu of Nippur, and including the city-states of "Kutha, TiWA, Sippar, Kazallu, Kiritab, [Api]ak and GN" as well as "Amorite [hi]ghlanders" revolted against the fourth Akkadian Empire ruler Naram-Sin of Akkad (c. 2255–2218 BC). The rebellion was joined by the city of Borsippa, among others. The revolt was crushed with the defeated including "Pu-palîm captain of Apiak" and "Dada governor of Apiak".

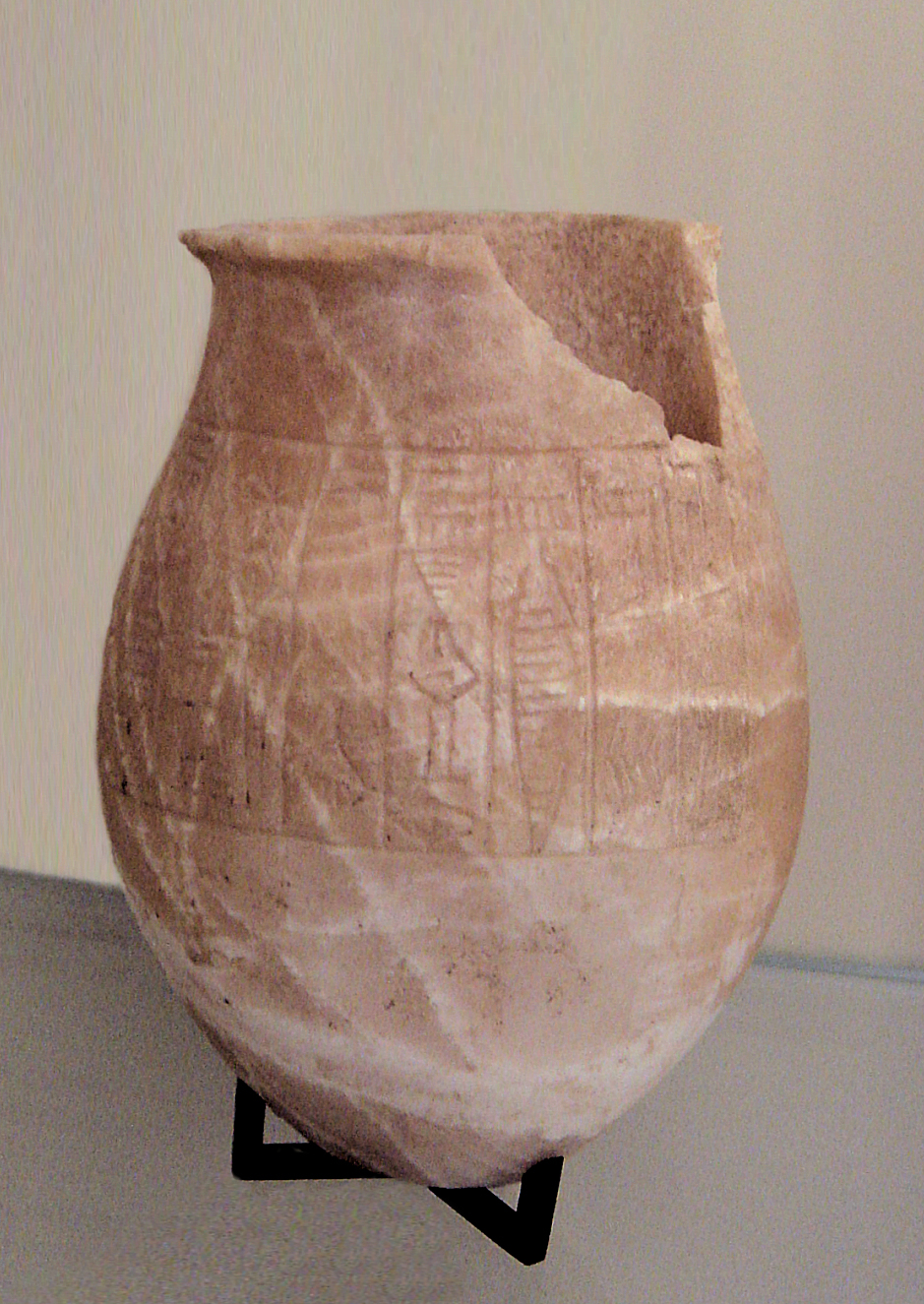
Alabaster vase of Dudu of Akkad, Louvre Museum AO 31549

An inscription of Dudu of Akkad (c. 2189-2168 BC) reads:

𒁺𒁺 𒁕𒈝 𒈗 𒀀𒂵𒉈𒆠 𒀀𒈾 𒀭𒊊𒀕𒃲 𒀀𒉈𒀝𒆠 𒀀𒈬𒊒 du-du da-num lugal a-ga-de3{ki} a-na {d}ne3-iri11-gal a-pi5-ak{ki} a mu-ru

"Dudu, the Great king of Akkad, for Nergal of Apiak has dedicated this"

The text Cadaster of Ur-Nammu (c. 2112-2094 BC), first Ur III Empire ruler, known from two Old Babylonian period copies, defines four neighboring Ur III provinces (out of 19 total), Kiritab, Apiak, [Uru]m, and Marada.Apiak was bordered by Kiritab in the north,

"From the "Tower of the god Numusda" to the "Shrine of the god Numusda"; from the "Shrine of the god Numusda" to the "Tower of the Mountain"; from the "Tower of the Mountain" to the Ser-ussa canal; from the Ser-ussa canal to Ibillum village; from Ibillum village to the Abgal canal; after (you) cross over the Abgal canal; from the source of (canal you) go 560 US ( = c. 2,016,000 m); (it is) this side of the boundary: its northern side. From this side of the boundary to Me-en-ili: its eastern side. From Me-en-ili to the bank of the Abgal canal (at) the source of the Ilum-bani canal; after (you) cross over the Abgal canal; from (Text: to) the source of the Ida'um canal to the IM.NI-a canal: its southern side. From the IM.NI-a canal to NAGAR.BI; from NAGAR.BI to the "Swamp City"; from "Swamp City" to the "Mountain"; from the "Mountain" to the back side of the "Mountain"; to the "Tower of the god Numusda": <its western side> Boundary of the god Meslamtaea of Apiak. Ur-Nammu, the king, determined it"

In the Casdaster the maintenance of the province boundary is the responsibility of Meslamta'ea of Apiak.

The Ur III provinces, from north to south were Sippar, Tiwe, Urum, Puö, Gudua, Babylon, Kis, Kazallu, Apiak, Marad, Nippur, Uru-sagrig, Isin, Adab, Suruppak, Umma, Girsu, Uruk, and Ur. Two governors of Apiak under Ur III are known, Šu-Tirum (šu-ti-ru-um) and Šarrum-bani (šar-ru-um-ba-ni) during the later half of the reign of Amar-Sin. Another has been suggested, Babati, based on a text "... Babati, the scribe, auditor ... and governor of Awal and Apiak; canal inspector who has irrigated the land; ... temple administrator of Bēlat-Terraban and Bēlat-Śuḫnir, ...". Babati was the brother of Abi-simti, a wife of Ur III ruler Amar-Sin. Šarrum-bani is assumed to be the one of that name to have also been a general (šagina), married a princess, and be part of the military Correspondence of the Kings of Ur.

Apiak was controlled by the founding Isin ruler Išbi-Erra (c. 2017-1986 BC). There is a palace inscription and a copy of a dedication to Nergal of Apiak on a votive lion sculpture of Damiq-ilishu (c. 1816–1794 BC), final ruler of the First Dynasty of Isin "To Nergal of Apiak, important lord, lion possessing strength, his god, for the life of Damiq-ilišu, ...". A year name of Larsa ruler Sin-Iqisham (c. 1836-1835 BC) records "Year (Sin-iqiszam) made (statues) of / for Numushda, Namrat and Lugal-apiak and brought them into the city of Kazallu".

== See also ==
- Cities of the Ancient Near East
- List of Mesopotamian deities
- List of Mesopotamian dynasties
