= Imzuanna =

Mesopotamian goddess

- Goddess of Marad
- Other names: Ninzuanna
- Major cult center: Marad

Genealogy
- Spouse: Lugal-Marada

Imzuanna, also known as Ninzuanna, was a Mesopotamian goddess worshiped in Marad as the wife of the city's tutelary god, Lugal-Marada. She is attested in various god lists, in the literary composition Lament for Sumer and Ur, and in at least one theophoric name. Known sources mentioning her come from between the Ur III and Neo-Babylonian periods.

In a trilingual edition of the Weidner god list known from Ugarit, Imzuanna is treated as an equivalent of the Hurrian weather god Teshub and his Ugaritic counterpart Baal, but due to the dissimilarity between their roles in the respective pantheons this is assumed to be a result of ancient scribes misinterpreting the first sign of the common writing of her name as the logogram ^{d}IM, which could designate weather deities.

== Name ==
The name of the goddess Imzuanna could be written as either ^{d}nin-zu-an-na or ^{d}im-zu-an-na. The former is known for example from an Old Babylonian god list and from Lament for Sumer and Ur, while the latter from An = Anum and in a Neo-Babylonian theophoric name, Imzuanna-emqet.

According to Richard L. Litke, it should be assumed that the cuneiform sign IM was read as ni in the name of this goddess, and the form Imzuanna is incorrect, but Antoine Cavigneaux and Manfred Krebernik disagree with this conclusion, as one of the ancient commentaries on the Weidner god list affirms that the name could be pronounced as Imzuanna. They suggest that this might reflect a form in which the initial consonant in the form "Ninzuanna" was not pronounced. This proposal is accepted by Daisuke Shibata. As of 2022, the spelling Imzuanna remains accepted in Assyriological literature.

== Associations with other deities ==
Imzuanna was regarded as the wife of Lugal-Marada (also spelled Lugalmarda), the tutelary god of Marad. They are frequently attested alongside each other in known sources. According to an Old Babylonian god list, they were two of the three main deities of Marad, the third being Lulu, initially distinct but later conflated with Lugal-Marada.

According to Richard L. Litke and Wilfred G. Lambert, the god list An = Anum indicates that Imzuanna had her own sukkal (divine vizier), Ili-mīšar. Marten Stol, relying on the same source, instead argues this deity was one of the two sukkals of Lugal-Marada, the other being Lugal-mea. Litke proposes identifying Ili-mīšar with Mīšaru, a minor god regarded as a son of Adad.

An association between Imzuanna and the medicine goddess Gula is also attested in a Neo-Assyrian version of the Weidner god list. According to Daisuke Shibata, the commentary provided outright equates the two goddesses, as well as their respective spouses Lugal-Marada and Ninurta.

== Textual sources ==
An offering list from the Ur III period mentions Imzuanna alongside Lugal-Marada.

In the incantation series Šurpu (tablet VIII, lines 31–33) Imzuanna appears after Lugal-Marada in a sequence of deities implored to release a patient from a curse. They are followed by Ninimma, Shuzianna, Šulpae, Sadarnunna, Belet-ili, Sud, Sirash and Ningishzida.

Imzuanna (under the name Ninzuanna) appears in the composition Lament for Sumer and Ur. The circumstances described in this work make her and her Lugal-Marada leave their city, prompting her to lament her fate and the destruction of her dwelling. The section dedicated to them is placed between these focused on Numushda and his wife Namrat from Kazallu and Ninisina from Isin.

== Outside Mesopotamia ==
In the trilingual Sumero-Hurro-Ugaritic version of the Weidner god list from Ugarit, Imzuanna (im-zu-an-na) corresponds to Hurrian Teshub (te-eš-ša-ab) and local Baal (ba-a-lu), who were both weather deities. It has been suggested that the equation with Teshub might have been already present in the earlier bilingual Sumero-Hurrian edition known from a copy from Emar. Daniel Schwemer notes that no known Mesopotamian sources associate Imzuanna with the Mesopotamian weather god, Ishkur/Adad, and therefore concludes that Jean Nougayrol's assumption that the equivalence between the three deities was a result of scribal confusion caused by the common usage of ^{d}IM as a logogram representing the names of weather deities is most likely correct. This view is also accepted by other researchers. Aaron Tugendhaft agrees that the list is not an accurate representation of the theological position of Baal and Teshub, but argues it is possible that the equation is not a result of confusion, but conscious scribal word play.

It is generally assumed that the character of Imzuanna was not similar to that of Baal and Teshub, though unlike other authors Irene Sibbing-Plantholt in a recent publication describes her as a storm deity.
