= Lugal-Marada =

Mesopotamian god

- Tutelary god of Marad
- Temple: Eigikalamma

Genealogy
- Spouse: Imzuanna

Equivalents
- Hurrian: Aštabi
- Ugaritic: Attar

Lugal-Marada (𒀭𒈗𒀫𒁕 ^{d}lugal-marad-da) was a Mesopotamian god who served as the tutelary deity of the city of Marad. His wife was Imzuanna. He was seemingly conflated with another local god, Lulu. There is also evidence that he could be viewed as a manifestation of Ninurta. He had a temple in Marad, the Eigikalamma, and additionally appears in Old Babylonian oath formulas from this city.

== Character and associations with other deities ==
Lugal-Marada was the city god of Marad. He was regarded as a warlike deity.

The goddess Imzuanna, also known as Ninzuanna, was Lugal-Marada's wife. Marten Stol refers to two deities, Lugalmea and Ili-mīšar, as his divine attendants, but according to Wilfred G. Lambert, the latter was associated with Imzuanna.

A single Neo-Babylonian letter from Marad refers to Nabu and Nergal as Lugal-Marada's brothers, However, according to Stol this is most likely an example of captatio benevolentiae, and should be treated as a rhetorical device, rather than theological speculation about his genealogy.

In early sources, Lugal-Marada does not appear in any theophoric names from Marad, and instead the theonym Lulu is common in them. Examples of Lulu names include Lulu-bani, Galzu-Lulu, Lulu-ēreš, Lulu-rābi, Galzu-Lulu, Ibbi-Lulu, Lulum-waqar, Puzur-lulu, Riš-Lulu and only partially preserved Lulu-ni-[...]. In an Old Babylonian god list Lugal-Marada and Lulu are listed as two separate deities from Marad, but in later sources they are equated with each other. Lulu is not attested outside this city. In various syncretic theological texts, Lugal-Marda could be regarded as a manifestation of Ninurta. According to Manfred Krebernik, an equation between him and Lugalbanda is also attested, though the evidence he lists is only their placement in the proximity of each other in the Weidner god list and An = Anum. In the trilingual edition of the former of these texts, known from Ugarit, he corresponds to Aštabi in the Hurrian column and Attar in the Ugaritic one.

== Worship ==
Lugal-Marada was worshiped in Marad at least since the Old Akkadian period, when his temple was built by Lipit-ilē governor at Marad and the son of king Naram-Sin. King Lipit-Ishtar built a temple dedicated to him known under the ceremonial name Eigikalamma, "house, eye of the land." It was subsequently rebuilt by Kadashman-Turgu and Nabonidus. The lexical list Kagal refers to it as a temple of Ninurta instead, and Andrew R. George interprets it as "the temple of Ninurta as Lugal-Marada." A further temple dedicated to Lugal-Marada existed in Isin. According to Marten Stol, based on a Neo-Babylonian letter yet another was possibly located near Uruk. However, Paul-Alain Beaulieu in a more recent study states that the only reference to Lugal-Marada in the entire corpus appears to pertain to the temple of this god in Marad, rather than to any settlement in the immediate proximity of Uruk, and deals with the delivery of dates for which a member of its staff was responsible.

The office of a nin-dingir priestess of Lugal-Marada is mentioned in a text from Drehem dated to the 45th year of Shulgi's reign and in a year formula of Ishbi-Erra.

In Old Babylonian texts from Marad, Lugal-Marada appears in oath formulas. A single one contains an oath sworn by him and Numushda, a further text invoking these gods together is also known from Larsa. Presence of Lugal-Marada in oath formulas in texts from the unprovenanced archive of Ilum-bani has been used to argue for origin in Marad.
