= Bilalama =

Ruler of Eshnunna

King of Eshnunna
- Reign: c. 1981 - c. 1962 BC
- Predecessor: Kirikiri
- Successor: Isharramashu
- Died: c. 1962 BC
- Issue: Me-Kubi; Salil-la-Milkum
- Father: Kirikiri

Bilalama (died c. 1962 BC) was a 20th century BC ruler of Eshnunna, an ancient Mesopotamian kingdom located in the Diyala Valley in modern Iraq.

== Background ==
It is assumed that Bilalama was a contemporary of Ishbi-Erra and Shu-Ilishu of Isin. He was the son of the previous ruler of Eshnunna, Kirikiri. The names of both Bilalama and Kirikiri are Elamite, which according to Katrin de Graef might indicate that a dynastic change occurred in the city after the reign of their predecessor Nur-ahum. However, it is not clear if they necessarily were Elamites themselves, or if their names only reflect a high level of Elamite cultural influence on Eshnunna.

Bilalama married a daughter of Abda-El, an Amorite chieftain who earlier for diplomatic reasons had his son Ušašum marry a daughter of Nūr-aḫum. Both marriages were most likely meant to guarantee positive relations between the rulers of Eshnunna and the local Amorite groups.

Two children of Bilalama are known. His daughter, Me-Kubi married king Tan-Ruhuratir of Elam, as documented in an inscription commemorating the construction of a temple of Inanna in Susa. She is also mentioned in the inscription on a lapis lazuli seal which states Bilalama apparently gifted it to her. It is also known that he had a son bearing an Amorite name, Šalil-la-Milkum. It has additionally been proposed that a later ruler of Eshnunna, Uṣur-awassu, also was a son of Bilalama.

A number of objects inscribed with names of individuals identified as servants of Bilalama have been discovered, including these attributed to the chanter (NAR) Wusum-bēlī, and a number of scribes (Puzur-Tishpak, Ilšu-dān and Lugal-inim-du).

== Reign ==
As indicated by an inscription identified on a stamped brick from the palace excavated in Eshunna, Bilalama used the titles "governor (ensi) of Eshnunna" and "beloved of Tishpak". Tishpak was the tutelary god of the city, and was customarily seen as its king, with human rulers serving as governors on his behalf, similarly to how their contemporaries in Der and Assur were seen as representatives of Ištaran and Ashur, respectively.

14 year names attributed to Bilalama are known, but it is agreed he remained in power for longer, likely for around 20 years. This contrasts with the short duration of his predecessor Kirikiri's rule over Eshnunna, which according to maximal estimates only lasted around 10 years.

Multiple building projects are mentioned in Bilalama's inscriptions. He added a new wing to the royal palace and rebuilt the temple of Tishpak, known under the ceremonial name Esikil.

Bilalama maintained independence from the major powers of his era. He married into the family of the Amorite chieftain Abda-El and maintained positive relations with it, but he clashed with the Amorites inhabiting Eqel-Ibbi-Sîn, Išur, and Bāb-Ibaum, and incorporated the last of these cities into his kingdom after its conquest. In contrast with the fluid political relations with Amorites, he maintained a consistently positive relationship with Elam. However, he was simultaneously allied with Ilum-muttabil of Der, whose inscriptions indicate he was hostile to Elam. He was seemingly perceived negatively by rulers of Isin, as a letter attributed to either Ishbi-Erra or Shu-Ilishu criticized him for disrespecting him in another letter, which he sent to Ilum-muttabil.

Bilalama was succeeded on the throne of Eshnunna by Isharramashu.

Regnal titles
Preceded by Kirikiri	King of Eshnunna c. 1981 - c. 1962 BC	Succeeded by Isharramashu
