= Iddin-Dagan =

Iddin-Dagan 𒀭𒄿𒁷𒀭𒁕𒃶

King of Isin
- Reign: 21 regnal years c. 1975-1954 BCE (MC) c. 1900-1879 BCE (SC)
- Predecessor: Shu-Ilishu
- Successor: Ishme-Dagan
- Died: c. 1954 BC
- Issue: Ishme-Dagan (son); Matum-Niatum (daughter)
- Dynasty: First Dynasty of Isin
- Father: Shu-Ilishu

Iddin-Dagan (Akkadian: 𒀭𒄿𒁷𒀭𒁕𒃶, ^{D}i-din-^{D}da-gan; died c. 1954 BC) was the 3rd king of the dynasty of Isin. He is best known for his participation in the sacred marriage rite and the sexually-explicit hymn that described it.

== Reign ==
Iddin-Dagan was preceded by his father Shu-Ilishu and succeeded by his son Išme-Dagān. The Sumerian King List (Note: Sumerian King List extant in 16 copies.) indicates his reign lasted 21 regnal years. His titles included: “Mighty King” — “King of Isin” — “King of Ur” — “King of the Land of Sumer and Akkad.” (Note: lugal-kala-ga, lugal-i-si-in-KI-ga (lugal-KI-úri-ma), lugal-KI-en-gi-KI-uri-ke_{4}.) Several year-names are known.

Year-Names of Iddin-Dagan
Year	Event
01	Year Iddin-Dagan (became) king
02	Year Matumniatum daughter of Iddin-Dagan was taken in marriage by the king of Anshan
03	Year after the year in which Matumniatum daughter of Iddin-Dagan was taken in marriage by the king of Anszan; Year (Iddin-Dagan) chose (by means of the omens) the high-priestess of Iszkur
04	Year after the year (Iddin-Dagan) chose (by means of the omens) the high-priestess of Iszkur
05	Year (Iddin-Dagan) chose by means of the omens the en-priest of Inanna
06	Year (Iddin-Dagan) made a great copper statue for Nin-Isin
07	Year after the year (Iddin-Dagan) made a great copper statue for Nin-Isin
08	Year (Iddin-Dagan) chose by means of the omens the high-priestess of Nin-kilim (gilil is a glosse for kilim)
09	Year Iddin-Dagan elevated to office the en-priest of Inanna
a	Year Iddin-Dagan made a throne dais for Iszkur of Karkar.
b	Year Iddin-Dagan made a throne dais for the Dublamah of Nanna / the magnificent accounting office of Nanna
b+1	Year after the year Iddin-Dagan made the throne dais for the Dublamah of Nanna / the magnificent accounting office of Nanna
c	Year Iddin-Dagan the king made a great emblem for Nin-Isin
c+1	Year after the year Iddin-Dagan the king made a great emblem for Nin-Isin

=== Marriage alliance with Anshan ===
The first year name recorded on a receipt for flour and dates (Note: Tablet UM 55–21–102, University Museum, Philadelphia.) reads: “Year Iddin-Dagān (was) king and (his) daughter Matum-Niatum (“the land which belongs to us”) was taken in marriage by the king of Anshan.” (Note: mu ^{d}I-dan ^{d}Da-gan lugal-e [Ma]-tum-ni-a-tum [dumu-mí]-a-ni lugal An-ša-an(a)^{[ki]} ba-an-tuk-a.) Vallat suggests it was to Imazu (son of Kindattu, who was the groom and possibly the king of the region of Shimashki) (Note: Dynastic list of the kings of Awan and Simashki, Sb 17729 in the Louvre.) as he was described as the King of Anshan in a seal inscription, although elsewhere unattested. Kindattu had been driven away from the city-state of Ur by Išbi-Erra (Note: Išbi-Erra and Kindattu, tablets N 1740 + CBS 14051.) (the founder of the First Dynasty of Isin), however; relations had apparently thawed sufficiently for Tan-Ruhurarter (the 8th king to wed the daughter of Bilalama, the énsí of Eshnunna.) His daughter must have been at marriage age (coming-of-age) when he became king, indicating that the king himself maybe was in his 30s.

=== Sacred Marriage Hymn ===
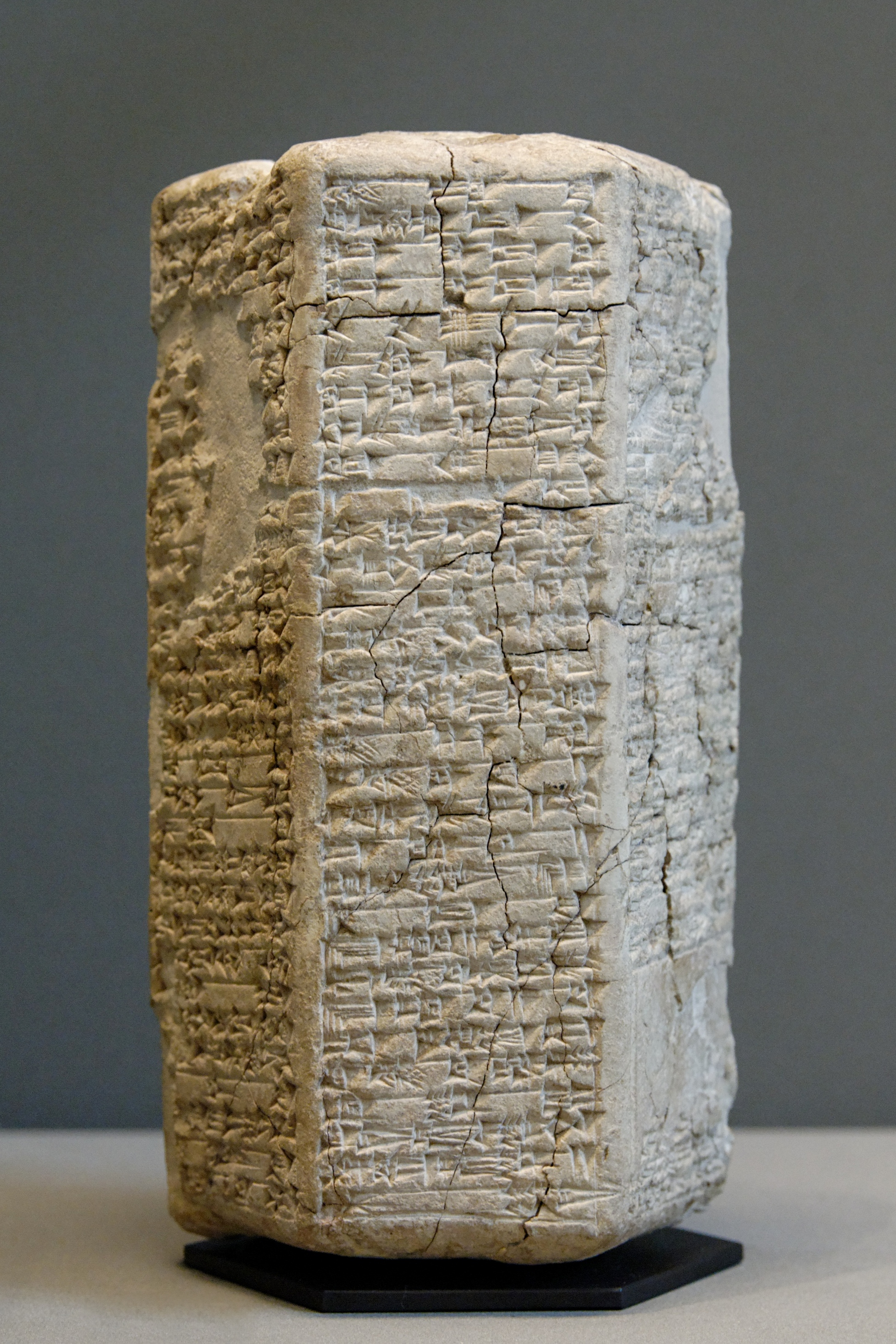
A praise poem to Iddin-Dagān, King of Sumer. Cuneiform script inscribed on a clay hexagonal prism, currently located at the Musée du Louvre (Note: Prism AO 8864, Louvre.) (dated to c. 1950 BC).

The continued fecundity of the land was ensured by the annual performance of the sacred marriage ritual in which the king impersonated the god Dumuzi-Ama-ušumgal-ana and a priestess played the role of Inanna. A hymn describing Iddin-Dagan's performance of this ritual in ten sections (Kiruḡu) indicates that this ceremony involved a procession of: male prostitutes, wise women, drummers, priestesses, and priests bloodletting with swords to the accompaniment of music, followed by offerings and sacrifices for the goddess Inanna, or Ninegala.

The ceremony reached its climax with the copulation of the king and priestess and is described thus:

She bathes (her) loins for the king. She bathes (her) loins for Iddin-Dagān. Holy Inanna bathes with soap, and sprinkles the floor with aromatic resin. The king then approached (her) loins with head raised high. Iddin-Dagān approached (her) loins with head raised high. Ama-ušumgal-ana lies down beside her and {caresses her holy thighs} (says:) "O my holy thighs! O my holy Inanna!." After the lady has made him rejoice with her holy thighs on the bed, after holy Inanna has made him rejoice with her holy thighs on the bed, she relaxes (?) with him on her bed: "Iddin-Dagān, you are indeed my beloved!"

— šir-namursaḡa to Inanna for Iddin-Dagān, 9th Kiruḡu

There are four extant hymns addressed to Iddin-Dagan: this Sacred Marriage Hymn, a praise poem dedicated to the king, a war song, and a dedicatory prayer.

== Attestations ==
There is only one contemporary monumental text of Iddin-Dagan that is extant. This is a fragment of a stone statue (Note: MM 1974.26 Medelhavsmuseet, Stockholm.) with a votive inscription which invokes Ninisina and Damu to curse those who foster evil intent against it. Two later clay tablets (Note: Tablets IM 85467 and IM 85466, National Museum of Iraq.) preserve an inscription recording an unspecified object fashioned for the god Nanna. These were found by the British archaeologist Sir Charles Leonard Woolley in a scribal school house in Ur. A tablet (Note: Excavation number U 2682.) from the Enunmaḫ in Ur dated to the 14th year of Gungunum (fl. c. 1868 BC — c. 1841 BC) of Larsa, after his conquest of the city, bears the seal impression of a servant of his. A tablet (Note: Tablet UM L-29-578, University Museum Philadelphia.) described Iddin-Dagān's fashioning of two copper festival statues for Ninlil, which were not delivered to Nippur until 170 years later by Enlil-bāni. Belles-lettres preserve the correspondence from Iddin-Dagān to his general Sîn-illat about Kakkulātum and the state of his troops, and from his general describing an ambush by the Martu (Amorites).

Preceded by Shu-Ilishu	King of Isin c. 1975 - c. 1954 BC	Succeeded by Ishme-Dagan

== See also ==
- History of Sumer
- List of Mesopotamian dynasties
- Sumer
- Year-Names
