= Manana Dynasty =

Mesopotamian rulers

Cities of Sumer

The Manana Dynasty (also Mananā Dynasty and Mananâ Dynasty) ruled over an ancient Near East state in Mesopotamia during Isin-Larsa period in the chaotic time after the fall of the Ur III Empire. In the power vacuum, Mesopotamia became a struggle for power between city-states, some like Isin, Larsa, and later Babylon would rise while others, like the state ruled by the Manana Dynasty, faded from history.

A number of rulers of the dynasty are known and some of their year names but their order and regnal lengths are unknown as the Manana Dynasty is not featured in any of the King Lists such as the Sumerian King List. Manana is known, for a time, to have controlled the ancient city of Kish under several rulers. It is not certain how long the dynasty lasted though forty two regnal year names (in Sumerian) are known which sets a lower bound. This dynasty was one of a number of Amorite powers that emerged in the region during the early 2nd millennium BC. Its patron deity was Sin.

The rise of Larsa under ruler Sumuel (c. 1895-1866 BC) put an end to the power of the Manana Dynasty though it appears that the dynasty maintained local rulership for a time after that. Later the area came under the control of Babylon with a Apil-Sin (c. 1830-1813 BC) year name reading "Year the temple of Inanna in Elip was built" and Hammurabi (c. 1792-1750 BC) year name reading "Year in which Hammu-rabi the king elevated a statue for Inanna of Elip". The location of this state is unknown but lay near the city of unlocated city of Kazallu, Kish, and Babylon. The Abgal canal (known as far back as the Akkadian Empire and flowing past Kish) and Me-enlila canal (known as far back as the Ur III period) were in the area of control, based on Manana ruler year names like "year after the year: he dammed the Abgal canal and the Me-enlila canal". The Me-enlila was a branch off the Abgal and flowed to the city of Marad.

The city-state's principle cities were Akusum/Akuṣ (where the goddess Ištar akuṣītum was worshiped), Sagdainpad, and Ilip/Elip (KI.BAL.MAS.DA) of which the latter is generally thought to be the capital though Damrum (HI.GAR^{ki}) near Kish has also been suggested as have Kutha, Lagaba, and Akshak. The city of Akusum is known to have had a city wall and a temple of Inanna with a gate and a silver offering table. The 4th year name of Sumuel (c. 1892 BC), ruler of Larsa, was "Year Akusum was destroyed and the army of Kazallu was smitten by weapons". It is known that the city god of Damrum was Nanna (Sin), also the tutelary god of the dynasty, and that there were Nadītu of that god there. The cities of Ilip and Sagdainpad are mentioned in texts of the earlier Early Dynastic II period. The city of Sagdainpad is known to have had a city wall.

== Sources ==
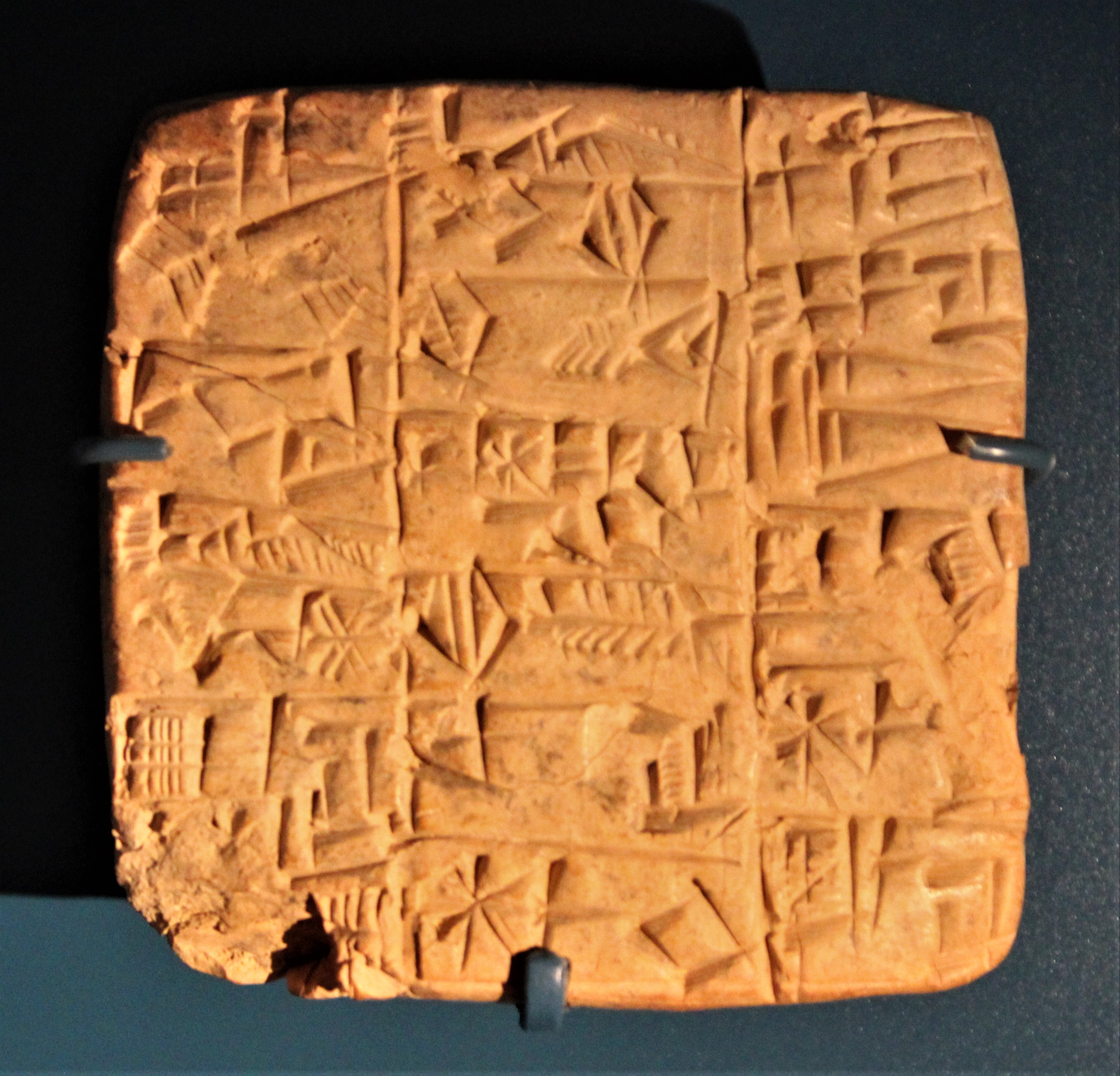
List of personal names in Sumerian, Larsa.

A few dozen cuneiform texts from the Manana dynasty have been excavated at Kish but the remaining several hundred are without provenance have appeared on the antiquities market after being looted, beginning in 1910. Most of the texts are held in the Louvre museum, the Yale Babylonian Collection and the Oriental Institute. Aside from a few object inscriptions the main textual source for the dynasty is several archives that became available, primarily on economic and legal matters. They are of unknown provenance but are thought to have largely come from the town of Damrum near Kish. These archives include those of Šumšunu-watar (34 texts), Ṣīssu-nawrat son of Bēlum (19 texts), and Sîn-iddinam, son of Sanīya and his brothers (27 texts). The archives of Ea-dāpin (10 texts) and Ibbi-Ilabrat (15 texts) can be dated to the later part of the reign of Sumu-la-El of Babylon. Many of the personal names are Akkadian or Sumerian but a number of Amorite names are also present in the texts.

== Rulers ==
Lacking king lists, the ruler order is generally assumed, while not certain, to be:

- Halium (Haliyum) - Of his eleven known year names one was "Year Ur-Ninurta was defeated / killed". This makes him a contemporary of Ur-Ninurta (c. 1923–1896 BC) the 6th king of the First Dynasty of Isin, a usurper who had seized the throne. The rest of his year names deal with peaceful activities like canal building and cultic actions for the gods Nanna (Sin) and Inanna.
- Abdi-Erah - Only his accession year name "Year Abdi-erah seized the throne" and the following year name "Year after the year Abdi-erah seized the throne" are known. A partial and damaged clay cone reads "Abdi-[Erah], son of Huzu[...], king of K[is], ..., b[uilt] the wa[ll ...]" where king of kish is used in an absolute sense of ruling Kish and not as an indication of overall control of Mesopotamia. Not to be confused with the earlier Abdi-Erah who ruled Tutub.
- Manana - Fourteen year names of Manana are known. They are all on peacetime and cultic activities including building a temple of Amurrum and building the city walls of Dunnum and Akusum.
- Nâqimum - Six year names are known. Notable ones were "Year the Edublamah was built" (this is the name of a temple of the god Sin in Ur) and "Year Naqimum built the gate (of the temple) of Inanna in Akusum", showing there was a cult center for Inanna in that city.
- Ahi-maras - Only his accession year name is known. He is also mentioned in a tablet found at Me-Turan.
- Sumu-iamutbala (Sûmû-Yamutbal) - Nine year names are known. Aside from building the city wall of Sagdainpad all are for cultic matters including those for the god Ningal and Nanna (Sin). A single cylinder seal mentions this ruler "Sin-isme'anni, son of Sin-iddinam, servant of Sumu-iamutbala". Two texts dated to the reign of Sin-Iddinam (c. 1849-1843 BC) ruler of Larsa mention Sûmû-Yamutbal.
- Manium - A hematite seal reads "Sin-eriba[m], son of Sin-ennam, servant of Manium". Manium is found on a tablet bearing a year name "Year when (he dug) the canal opposite the plateau and the Sumu-la-el-hegal Canal" and containing an "Oath by Marduk and Sumu-la-el, Nanna and Manium" which is taken to indicate Manium ruled under Babylon.

The rulers Manna-balti-El and Ashduni-yarim (known to have ruled Kish) have also been proposed. A Ibni-šadûm, a king of Kisurra in that period was son of a Manna-balti-El, an earlier king of Kisurra, and son-in-law of Sûmû-El of Larsa though it is not completely certain this was the same Manna-balti-El.

Another ruler, Iawium (Jawium), governed the city of Kish under Halium and Manana. Ten year names of Iawium are known, the first being "Year when Sumu-ditan died" referring to the ruler of the city of Marad who was contemporary with Sumu-abum of Babylon.

== Elip ==
The city of Elip (Elip^{ki}), alternately Ilip (I-lip^{ki}) or Kibalmašda (KI.BAL.MAŠ.DÀ^{ki}), is generally considered to have been the capitol of the still obscure Manana Dynasty which ruled the city and region of Kish for a time.

While most Elip sources are dated to the Old Babylonian period an Akkadian Empire period text has been described as mentioning a field as being between Elip to the east and Akkad to the west. It has been suggested that this Elip is the same city as the Isin/Larsa and Old Babylonian period Elip. In practice, the text refers to a property of "Enbu-ilum from Ilib" to the east and the property of a "Sanuna, a smith from Agade" to the west. The city of Elip is also mentioned in Early Dynastic II period lists of geographical names.

There is an unverified version of Sumu-abum year 3 reading "The year: he took Kibalmašda". The city of Elip is mentioned in three year names of rulers of the First Babylonian dynasty:

- Sumu-abum (c. 1894–1881 BC) year 2 "Year the city wall of Elip was seized"
- Apil-Sin (c. 1831–1813 BC) year 9 "Year the temple of Inanna in Elip was built"
- Hammu-rabi (c. 1792–1750 BC) year 17 "Year in which Hammu-rabi the king elevated a statue for Inanna of Elip".

The temple of Inanna (INANNA-ì-lip^{ki}) at Elip was called E_{2}-ki-tuš-kiri_{17}-zal ("joyful dwelling") and it is also known from the Nippur God List 57. The aspect of Inanna/Istar worshiped at Elip was "Belet-Elip". The god Sin may also have been worshiped there.

While some localizations for Elip put it nearby to Kish the site of Tell Khalfat, a 100 meter by 120 meter site in the Dilbat region, has also been suggested as the location of Elip. Against that, the main occupation at the site is Kassite dynasty period. It has been proposed that in Old Babylonian times Elip was the name of earlier city of Urum.

In the Neo-Babylonian period there is known to have been a temple of Mār-bīti (thought to be the vizier of the god Nabû), at Elip. At that time the area was under the administrative control of Babylon.

== See also ==
- Cities of the Ancient Near East
- List of Mesopotamian deities
- List of Mesopotamian dynasties
- Short chronology timeline
