= Shu-Ilishu =

Sumerian king, 20th-century BC

King of Isin
- Reign: 10 regnal years c. 1985 - c. 1975 BC
- Predecessor: Ishbi-Erra
- Successor: Iddin-Dagan
- Died: c. 1975 BC
- Issue: Iddin-Dagan
- Dynasty: First Dynasty of Isin

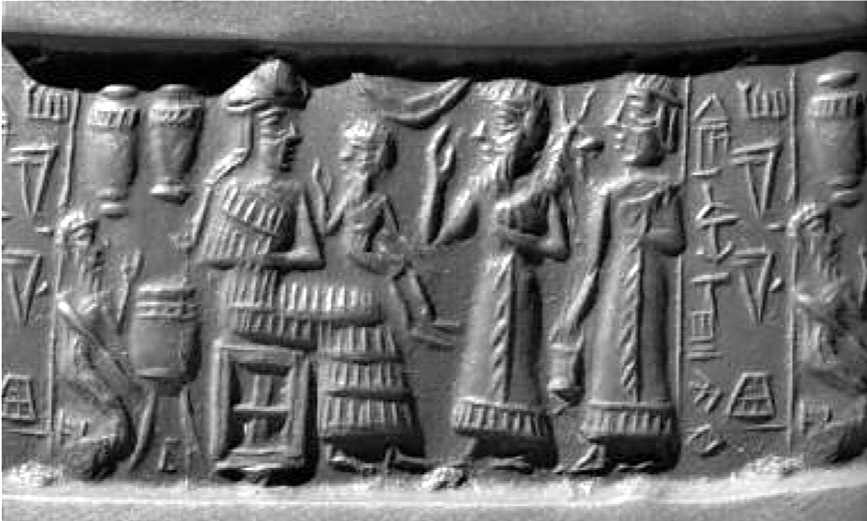
Cylinder-seal of Shu-ilishus, ca. 1920 BC

Shu-Ilishu (Akkadian: Šu-ilišu; died c. 1975 BC) was the 2nd ruler of the dynasty of Isin. Beginning on his ascension his name was written ^{d}Šu-i-li-šu with the dingir indicating that he was deified. He reigned for 10 years (according to his extant year-names and a single copy of the Sumerian King List, (Note: Sumerian King List, MS 1686.) which differs from the 20 years recorded by others.) (Note: Such as WB 444, the Weld-Blundell prism.) Shu-Ilishu was preceded by Išbi-erra. Iddin-Dagān then succeeded Shu-Ilishu. Shu-Ilishu is best known for his retrieval of the cultic idol of Nanna from the Elamites and its return to Ur.

== Biography ==
Shu-Ilishu's inscriptions gave him the titles: “Mighty Man” — “King of Ur” — “God of His Nation” — “Beloved of the gods Anu, Enlil, and Nanna” — “King of the Land of Sumer and Akkad” — “Beloved of the god Enlil and the goddess Ninisina” — “Lord of his Land”, but not “King of Isin” (a title which was not claimed by a ruler of Isin until the later reign of Ishme-Dagan). Shu-Ilishu did, however, rebuild the walls of his capital city Isin. He was a great benefactor of Ur (beginning the restoration which was to continue through his successors Iddin-Dagān and Išme-Dagan). Shu-Ilishu built a monumental gateway and recovered an idol representing Ur's patron deity (Nanna, god of the moon) which had been expropriated by the Elamites when they sacked the city, but whether he obtained it either through diplomacy or conflict is unknown. An inscription told of the city's resettlement: “He established for him when he established in Ur the people scattered as far as Anšan in their abode.” The “Lamentation over the Destruction of Ur” was composed around this time to explain the catastrophe, to call for its reconstruction and to protect the restorers from the curses attached to the ruins of the é.dub.lá.maḫ. In a clay sealing found at Eshnunna he named himself "King of Ur".

Shu-Ilishu commemorated the fashioning of a great emblem for Nanna, an exalted throne for An, a dais for Ninisin, a magur-boat(boat with highly raised Stern and prow) for Ninurta, and a dais for Ningal in year names for Shu-Ilishu's reign. An adab (or hymn) to Nergal (Note: Tablets CBS 14074, Ni 2482 and N 2833.) was composed in honor of Shu-Ilishu, together with an adab of An and perhaps a 3rd addressed to himself. The archive of a craft workshop (or giš-kin-ti) from Isin has been uncovered with 920 texts dating from Ishbi-Erra year 4 through to Shu-Ilishu year 3 — a period of 33 years. The tablets are records of receipts and disbursements of the leather goods, furniture, baskets, mats, and felt goods that were manufactured along with their raw materials. A 2nd archive (a receipt of cereal and issue of bread from a bakery, possibly connected to the temple of Enlil in Nippur) included an accounting record (Note: Tablet UM 55-21-125, University Museum, Philadelphia.) of expenditures of bread for the provision of the king and includes entries dated to his 2nd through 9th years which was used by Steele to determine the sequence of most of this king's year-names.

| Preceded by Ishbi-Erra | King of Isin c. 1985 - c. 1975 BC | Succeeded by Iddin-Dagan |

== See also ==
- Sumer
- History of Sumer
- List of Mesopotamian dynasties
