= Ishme-Dagan =

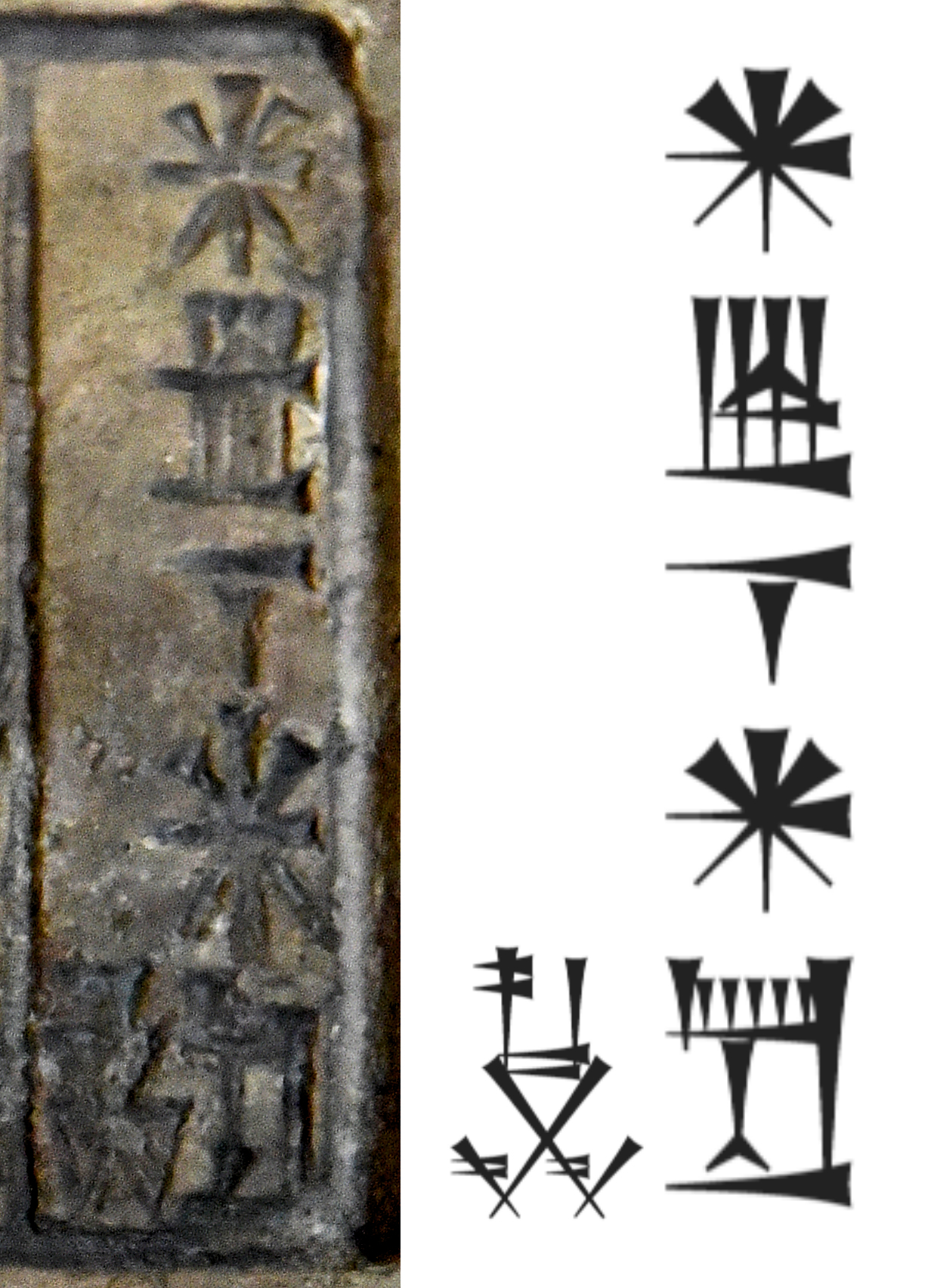
- Inscription of the name "Ishme-Dagan"

King of Isin
- Reign: c. 1954 - c. 1935 BC
- Predecessor: Iddin-Dagan
- Successor: Lipit-Ishtar
- Died: c. 1935 BC
- House: First Dynasty of Isin
- Father: Iddin-Dagan

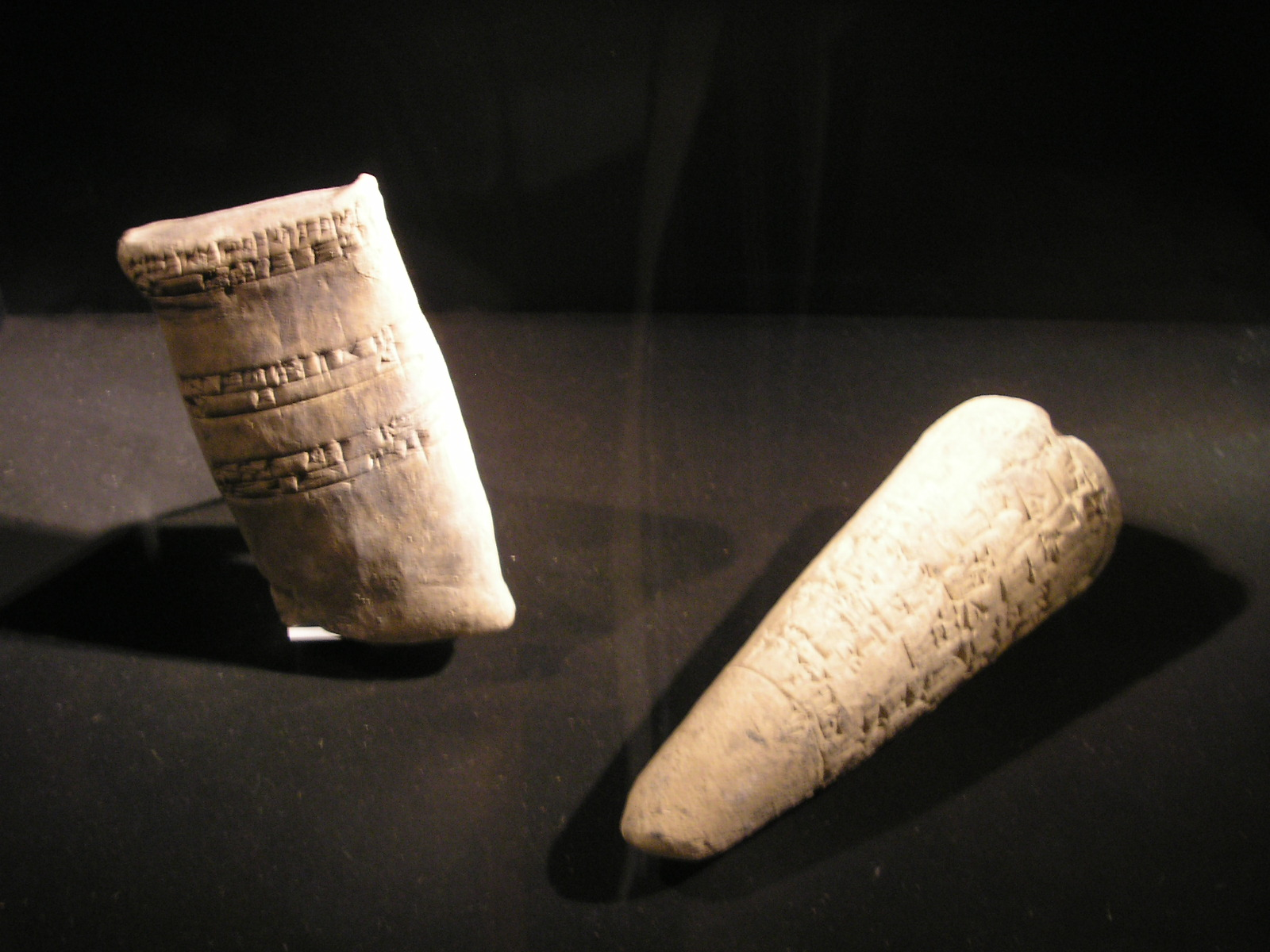
Left: Cuneiform clay tablet. Old Babylonian, 1900-1700 BC. Right: Sumerian cuneiform "foundation stone". This clay cone was embedded in a wall, and contains the deed of foundation of the city walls of Isin (Tell Bahriyat) by king Ishme-Dagan of Isin (1953-1935 BC).

Ishme-Dagan (Akkadian: 𒀭𒅖𒈨𒀭𒁕𒃶, ^{D}iš-me-^{D}da-gan, Išme-Dagān; died c. 1935 BC) was the 4th king of the First Dynasty of Isin, according to the "Sumerian King List" (SKL). Also according to the SKL: he was both the son and successor of Iddin-Dagan. Lipit-Ishtar then succeeded Ishme-Dagan. Ishme-Dagan was one of the kings to restore the Ekur.

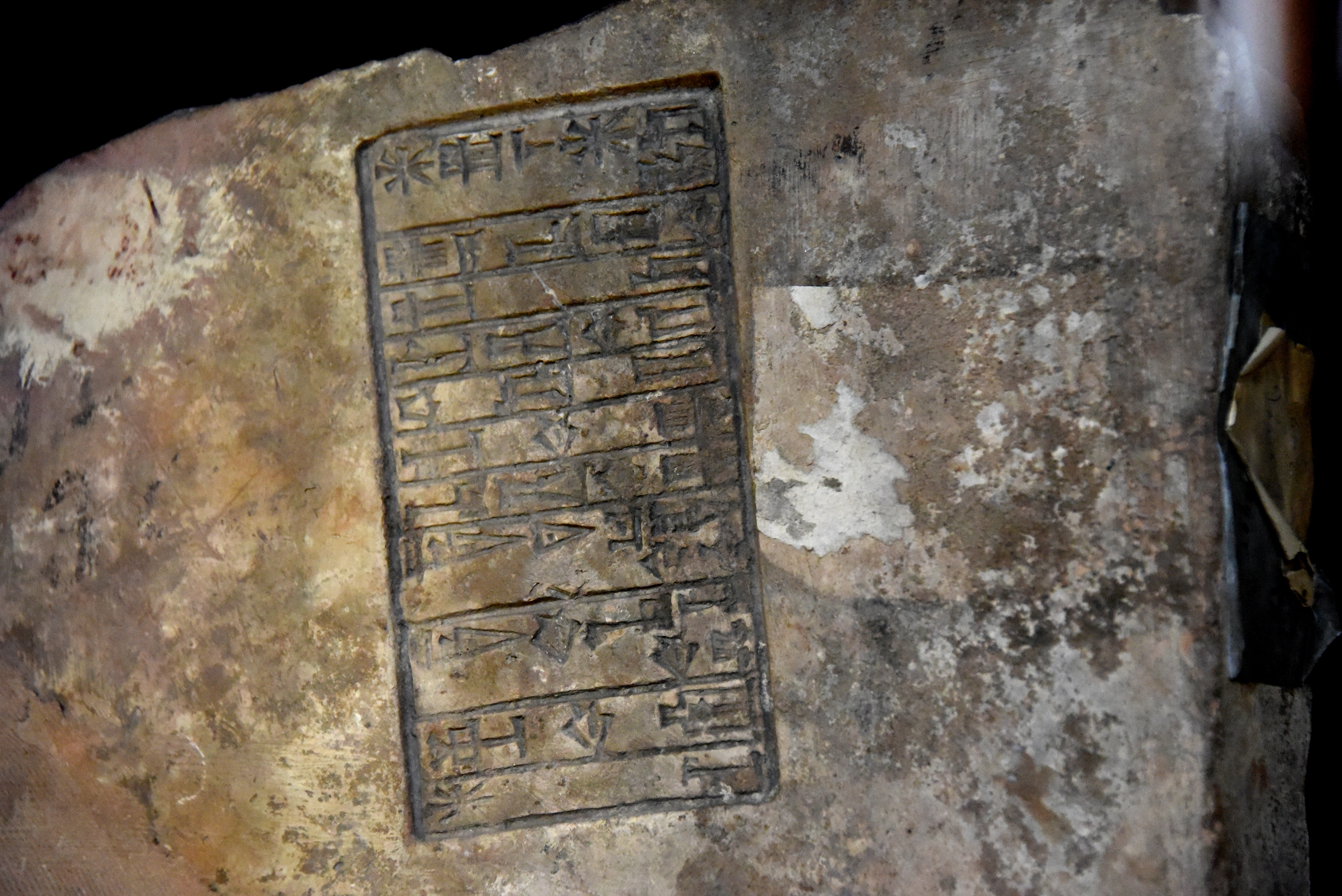
Stamped brick with the name of Ishme-Dagan, king of Isin, Isin-Larsa Period, from Ur, British Museum

== See also ==
- Isin
- Sumer
- Amorites
- History of Sumer
- List of Mesopotamian dynasties

Preceded by Iddin-Dagan	King of Isin c. 1954 - c. 1935 BC	Succeeded by Lipit-Ishtar
