= Numushda =

Mesopotamian god

- God of nature associated with flooding
- Major cult center: Kazallu, Kiritab, Inab

Genealogy
- Parents: Nanna and Ningal
- Spouse: Namrat
- Children: Adgarkidu

Numushda (𒀭𒉡𒈲𒁕, ^{d}nu-muš-da) was a Mesopotamian god best known as the tutelary deity of Kazallu. The origin of his name is unknown, and might be neither Sumerian nor Akkadian. He was regarded as a violent deity, and was linked with nature, especially with flooding. A star named after him is also attested. He was regarded as a son of Nanna and Ningal, or alternatively of Enki. His wife was the sparsely attested goddess Namrat. According to the myth The Marriage of Martu they had a daughter, Adgarkidu, who married the eponymous deity. Late sources associate Numushda with the weather god Ishkur.

The oldest evidence for the worship of Numushda comes from the Early Dynastic period, and includes entries in god lists and offering lists and theophoric names. In addition to Kazallu, he was also associated with Kiritab and Inab, and he played an important role in Marad. A hymn dedicated to him was composed during the reign of one of the kings of Larsa, Sin-Iqisham, presumably during a period of peace between this city and his cult center. He is sparsely attested in sources postdating the Old Babylonian period, which is presumed to reflect the decline of Kazallu.

== Name and character ==
The theonym Numushda was usually written in cuneiform as ^{d}nu-muš-da, with variants such as ^{d}nu-umuš.muš-da (known from Sargonic and Ur III periods) and nu-mu-uš-ta (found in a single Emesal text) being sparsely attested. Its meaning is unknown. Antoine Cavingeaux and Manfred Krebernik note its resemblance to ME nu-MUŠ/BU-DU, a term attested in an Early Dynastic list of cultic personnel, though they ultimately conclude it is possible it had no Sumerian etymology. In a late Akkadian astrological text it is explained as nammaššu, a word which depending on the context can mean "people", "settlement" or "wild animals", though as noted by Jeremiah Peterson this is unlikely to be its original etymology.

The only known hymn dedicated to Numushda and a number of other literary texts describe him as a god associated with wild nature, and compare him to both real animals, such as lions, and to mythical mušḫuššu. He was regarded as a violent deity, and in that capacity he was associated with flooding. The so-called List of Stars and Deities refers to him as the "roaring god" (ilu šāgimu). He could be also associated with warfare.

Mesopotamian astronomical texts mention a star named after Numushda, presumed to be either Eta Centauri or Kappa Centauri. A late prayer describes it as an astral body which "makes the rain last long".

== Association with other deities ==
Numushda was often regarded as the son of the moon god Nanna (Suen) and his wife Ningal, though this tradition is absent from the earliest sources, dated to the third millennium BCE, which might indicate it only developed later on. This genealogy was likely meant to serve as a way assimilate him into the conventional pantheon of southern Mesopotamia, and might have been based on perceived similarity to another son of Nanna, Ningublaga, though no evidence for syncretism between these two deities is attested in god lists. Since Numushda is sparsely attested in sources from Ur, the cult center of Nanna, it is possible that the connection between them developed elsewhere. A single source preserves a tradition in which Numushda was a son of Enki instead. It is a literary text which describes how he was appointed to the position of the city god of Kazallu by Enlil, and how in the aftermath of this event one of them sends a spring flood which lets birds and fish flourish.

Numushda's wife was the goddess Namrat, whose name is Akkadian one and can be translated as "she is shining" or "the shining". Jacob Klein instead translates it as "fairy". She appears alongside her husband in the myth The Marriage of Martu and in Lament for Sumer and Ur, as well as in an Old Babylonian god list. The construction of statues representing her, Numushda and Lugal-Apiak is mentioned in a year name of Sin-Iqisham of Larsa. Antoine Cavingeaux and Manfred Krebernik suggest that she can be identified with ^{d}ḪU-ma-na, a deity who follows Numushda in the Nippur god list. Jeremiah Peterson points out that further research indicates that only one copy of this text preserves this spelling of the name, and most of them instead spell it as ^{d}ḪU-ma-at, which can be plausibly assumed to be a typo for ^{d}nam-ra-at, as the sign NAM was a derivative of ḪU. Namrat is not attested in any other sources, and her absence from the hymn to Numushda in particular has been noted.

According to the myth The Marriage of Martu, Numushda and Namrat had a daughter, Adgarkidu, who in this composition marries the eponymous god after he takes part in a wrestling competition meant to entertain Numushda. The latter initially offers him gold and precious stones as a reward instead of the hand of his daughter in marriage, and only agrees to permit him to marry her because Martu provides a large number of bridal gifts, chiefly livestock. Cavigneaux and Krebernik suggest that Martu's status as Numushda's son-in-law reflected their shared connection to nature. Another possibility is that it is a metaphorical representation of the gradual acculturation of the nomadic Martu people in Mesopotamia. In addition to this myth, evidence for an association between Numushda and Martu has also been identified in two laments.

Due to his connection with flooding, in late sources Numushda could be associated with the weather god Ishkur (Akkadian Adad). In the compendium MUL.APIN the star sharing Numushda's name is outright identified with the latter deity.

== Worship ==
Numushda was the tutelary god of Kazallu, a city located in the proximity of Marad and Kish, in the central part of modern Iraq. His temple located there bore the ceremonial name kun_{4}-sa-tu, "stairway to the mountain", or é-kun_{4}-sa-tu, "house, stairway of the mountain".

Early attestations of Numushda include the god lists from Fara and Abu Salabikh. Additional early evidence includes an offering list from the former of these two sites, as well as a theophoric names, with Sumerian examples known from both Fara and Lagash from the Early Dynastic period and Akkadian ones from sources from the Sargonic period. An ensi of Kazallu named Puzur-Numushda was among the rulers who rebelled against Naram-Sin.

Numushda continued to be worshiped in the Ur III period. A cadastre from the reign of Ur-Namma demarcating newly established provinces of his kingdom mentions various locations tied to Numushda, including a tower and a shrine. Bringing him to his temple in Kazallu is mentioned in a formula from the reign of Shulgi. Theophoric names invoking him are attested in texts Lagash, Umma and Ur from the same period.

In the Old Babylonian period, when Kazallu was one of the two capitals of an independent kingdom centered on Marad and ruled by an Amorite dynasty, oaths in this area were typically sworn either by Numushda or by Marad's tutelary god Lugal-Marada. Numushda also had a prominent role in Marad, as evidenced by references to him in the year names of local kings, including Sumu-ditana, Sumu-numhim and Sumu-atar, who all made donations to him. He is also attested in oath formulas from this city, in one case alongside Lugal-Marada. Numushda was also the tutelary god of Kiritab, another settlement located in the proximity of Kazallu and Marad. Furthermore, he was referred to as the "lord of Inab", though this toponym might refer to a mythical location. Another possibility is that it was the same city as Ilip (also spelled Elip). Only two sources associate him with it, the myth The Marriage of Martu and an Old Babylonian lament.

A hymn dedicated to Numushda was composed during the reign of Sin-Iqisham of Larsa, presumably during a short lived period of peace between his kingdom and Kazallu. Luděk Vacín argues that compositions from this state focused on minor deities such as him or Haya should be considered an example of a broader pattern which differentiates the royal hymns composed in Larsa from these from contemporary Isin and from the Ur III period, which focused on major deities. Sin-Iqisham might also have introduced the worship of Numushda to Nippur, though he apparently did not continue to be worshiped in this city later on. He was seemingly also venerated in Old Babylonian Ur, though the evidence is scarce.

In the Old Babylonian period Numushda also came to be worshiped in cities located in modern Syria, including Mari, where he is attested in an offering list from the reign of Zimri-Lim as the recipient of two sheep. He appears in it after Bēlet-Agade ("lady of Agade") and Kiššītum ("lady of Kish"). Akkadian theophoric names invoking him are known from two western sites, Mari (Iddin-Numušda, Numušda-nīrāri, Numušda-nūrī) and Tuttul (Šū-Numušda).

There is little evidence for the worship of Numushda after the Old Babylonian period, possibly due to the decline of his cult center Kazallu, which is last attested in texts from the reign of Hammurabi, and he is mostly attested in scholarly and astronomical context in later periods.
