= Sin-Iqisham =

King during the Old Babylonian Period

Sin-Iqisham 𒀭𒂗𒍪𒄿𒆠𒊭𒄠

King of Larsa
- Reign: c. 1841 - c. 1835 BC
- Died: c. 1835 BC
- Father: Sin-Eribam

Sin-Iqisham (𒀭𒂗𒍪𒄿𒆠𒊭𒄠; died c. 1835 BC) ruled the ancient Near East city-state of Larsa from c. 1841 BC to c. 1835 BC (MC). He was the son of Sin-Eribam and a contemporary of Zambiya of Isin.

The annals for his five-year reign record that he seized Pinaratim and Nazarum in his second year, and that he defeated Kazallu, Elam, and Zambiya, king of Isin and Babylon in his fifth year.

== See also ==
- Chronology of the ancient Near East
- List of Mesopotamian dynasties
