= Marad =

Sumerian city

- Tell Wannat es-Sadum
- Location within Iraq
- 32°05′34″N 44°47′00″E
- Type: settlement
- Periods: Isin-Larsa/Old-Babylonian, Kassite, Neo-Babylonian, Parthian
- Location: Iraq

Site notes
- Excavation dates: 1991, 2005-2007
- Archaeologists: Na'el Hannoon, Abbas Al-Hussainy
- Condition: Ruined
- Owner: Public
- Public access: Yes

Marad (Sumerian: Marda, modern Tell Wannat es-Sadum or Tell as-Sadoum (also Wana-Sedoum), Iraq) was an ancient Near Eastern city. Marad was situated on the west bank of the then western branch of the Upper Euphrates River west of Nippur in modern-day Iraq and roughly 50 km southeast of Kish, on the Arahtu River. The site was identified in 1912 based on a Neo-Babylonian inscription on a truncated cylinder of Nebuchadrezzar noting the restoration of the temple. The cylinder was not excavated but rather found by locals so its provenance was not certain, as to some extent was the site's identification as Marad. In ancient times it was on the canal, Abgal, running between Babylon and Isin. Tell Wanna is actually a small mound 1 kilometer from Tell as-Sadoum.

The site of Marad, uncluding a number of small mounds and ridges, covers an area of about 50 hectares with the main mound, at the northern edge of the site and locally called Bint as-Sheikh, rising 14 meters above the plain and is the location of the temple.

== History ==
=== Early Bronze Age ===
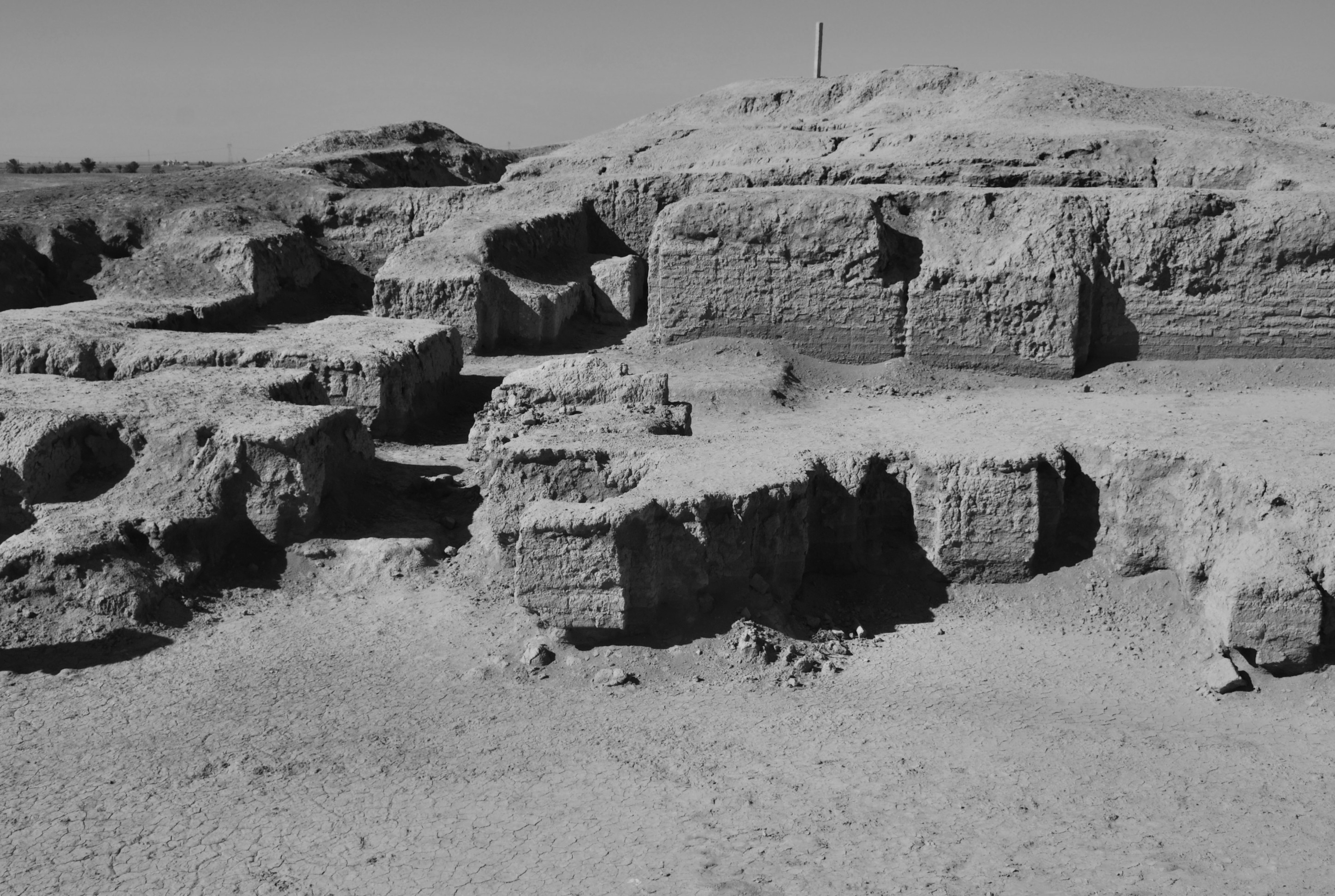
Tell as-Sadoum

==== Early Dynastic period ====
Marad was established ca. 2700 BC, during the Sumerian Early Dynastic II period. Although Marad is not mentioned in the Sumerian King List and in the earliest city lists, one of the Temple Hymns attributed to Enheduanna is focused on its city god, Lugal-Marada. The city god of Kazallu, Numushda, is also sometimes mentioned in contracts, though another nearby town, Kiritab, also had Numushda as its titular god so this is not certain.

==== Akkadian period ====
It was ruled by the Akkadian Empire, after its capture by Sargon of Akkad, under a governor. Confirmation of the site as Marad came with four inscribed door sockets reportedly found at "Wana-sedoum". They recorded that Lipit-ilē governor at Marad and the son of king Naram-Sin, fourth ruler of the Akkadian Empire, built a temple to the god Lugal-Marda at Marad:

"Naram-Sin, the mighty, king of the four quarters, victor in nine battles in one year: After he was victorious in those battles, he captured their three kings and brought (them) before the god Enlil, At that time, Lipit-ilē, his son, governor of Marad, built the temple of the god Lugalmarda at Marad. As for the one who removes this inscription, may the gods Samas and Lugalmarda tear out his foundation and destroy his progeny."

The city's main temple, a ziggurat, is E-igi-kalama (House which is the eye of the Land). It was dedicated to Lugal-Marada (thought by some to be a manifestation of Ninurta), the tutelary deity of Marad and the god of earth and the plow, built by one of Naram-Sin's sons.

==== Ur III period ====
After the fall of that empire Marad fell under the sway of the Ur III empire, again via a governor. The city was briefly under the control of Elam under until Elam fell to Ur with the first Ur III ruler, Ur-Nammu writing "Then: Umma, Marda, Šubur, Kazallu, and their settlements, and whatsoever was oppressed by Anšan, verily, I established their freedom". In 1920 a researcher purchased a small tablet "from a little Arab boy in the ruins of Babylon" dated to 3rd year of Amar-Sin, 3rd ruler of the Ur III empire. Lishanum was also mentioned in a Drehem tablet as a governor of an unknown city in the 5th year of Amar-Sin.

"Thirty-six fat sheep, twenty-eight sheep, the regular offering assessed as the tax of Lishanum Patesi of Marad, from Dungiurumu, on the twenty-ninth day, as a contribution, Abbasbagga [receiv]ed. Month Kisig-Ninazu, year when the great high priest of Anna appointed the priest of Nannar" (fourth year of Bur-Sin)."

=== Middle Bronze Age ===
The Middle Bronze Age is subdivided into the Isin-Larsa period (c. 2000-1800 BCE) and Old Babylonian period (c. 1800-1550 BCE).

==== Old Babylonian period ====
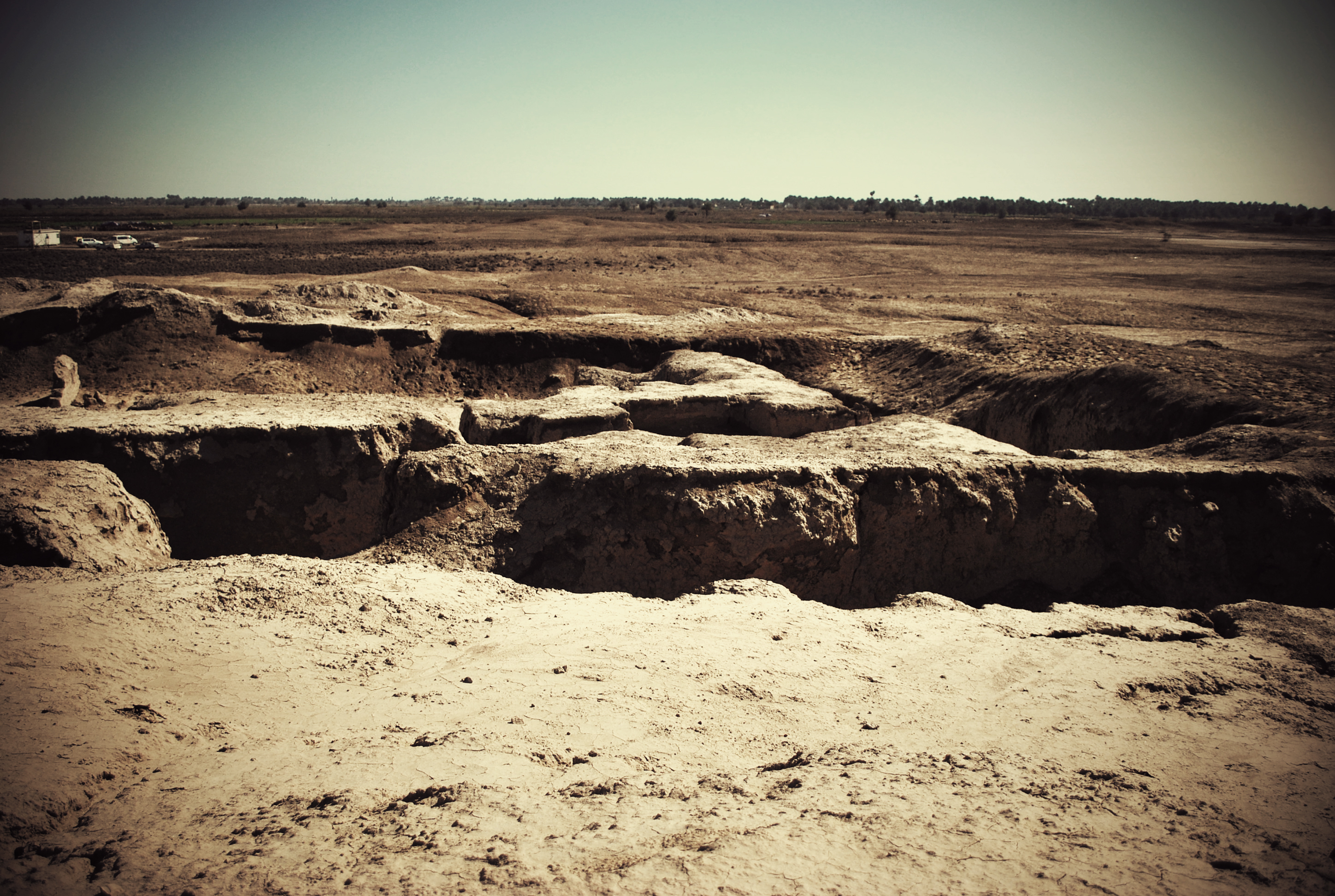
Tell as-Sadoum

After control by Isin for a time Marad had a brief period of independence before it was captured by Babylon. Some illicitly excavated tablets from this period appeared on the antiquities market, primarily a family archive of an economic nature. Known kings from that independent period are Halun-pi-umu, Sumu-ditana, Sumu-atar, Sumu-numhim, and Yamsi-el. In Old Babylonian times Marad is often mentioned together with Kazallu. It is believed that they were part of the same kingdom.

A notable known ruler of Marad, roughly from the same time as Babylonian ruler Sumu-la-El was Alumbiumu. Two year names are known, "Year Alumbiumu became king" and "Year Alumbiumu seized Dilbat". Also the 4th year name of Sumu-la-el and a matching year name of an unknown ruler of Kisurra reads "Year Alumbiumu was smitten by weapons". A royal daughter of Alumbiumu was made nadītu at Sippar, during the reign of Sumu-la-el.

Texts mentioning another ruler of Marad, Ašdumlû (written aš-du-um-lu-ú or áš-du-um-lu-ú), were found during the 2005-2007 excavations. Two year names were found, his accession year "Year: Ašdumlû became king" and "Year: the ditch of the Abgal canal was made" (alternate "Year: he dug the ditch of the Abgal canal"). This is assumed to be the Me-enlila canal which was a branch off the main Abgal canal from Kish. It has been suggested that one of the unattested year names Babylon ruler Sumu-la-El (c. 1881-1845 BC) reading "Year: Ašdum-marim was defeated by weapons." should actually be read "Year: Ašdumlû was defeated by weapons".

=== Iron age ===
Marad was also occupied in Neo-Babylonian and Neo-Assyrian times. Nebuchadnezzar II (605-562 BC) reports rebuilding the temple of Lugal-Marada:

"At that time for Lugal-Marada, my lord, his temple which is in Marada, whose ancient foundation platform no former king had seen since the days of old, its ancient foundation platform I sought and beheld, and upon the platform of King Naram-Sin, my ancient ancestor, I fixed its foundations. I made an inscription with my name and put it therein."

=== Later occupation ===
Light occupation occurred in the Kassite (with ruler Kadashman-Turgu known to have worked on the Lugal-Marda temple) and Parthian periods. A prebend (similar to a Benefice) document from the reign of Darius I (c. 550–486 BC) recording a sale for the temple E-igi-kalama for the god Ea which was written in Marad.

== Archaeology ==
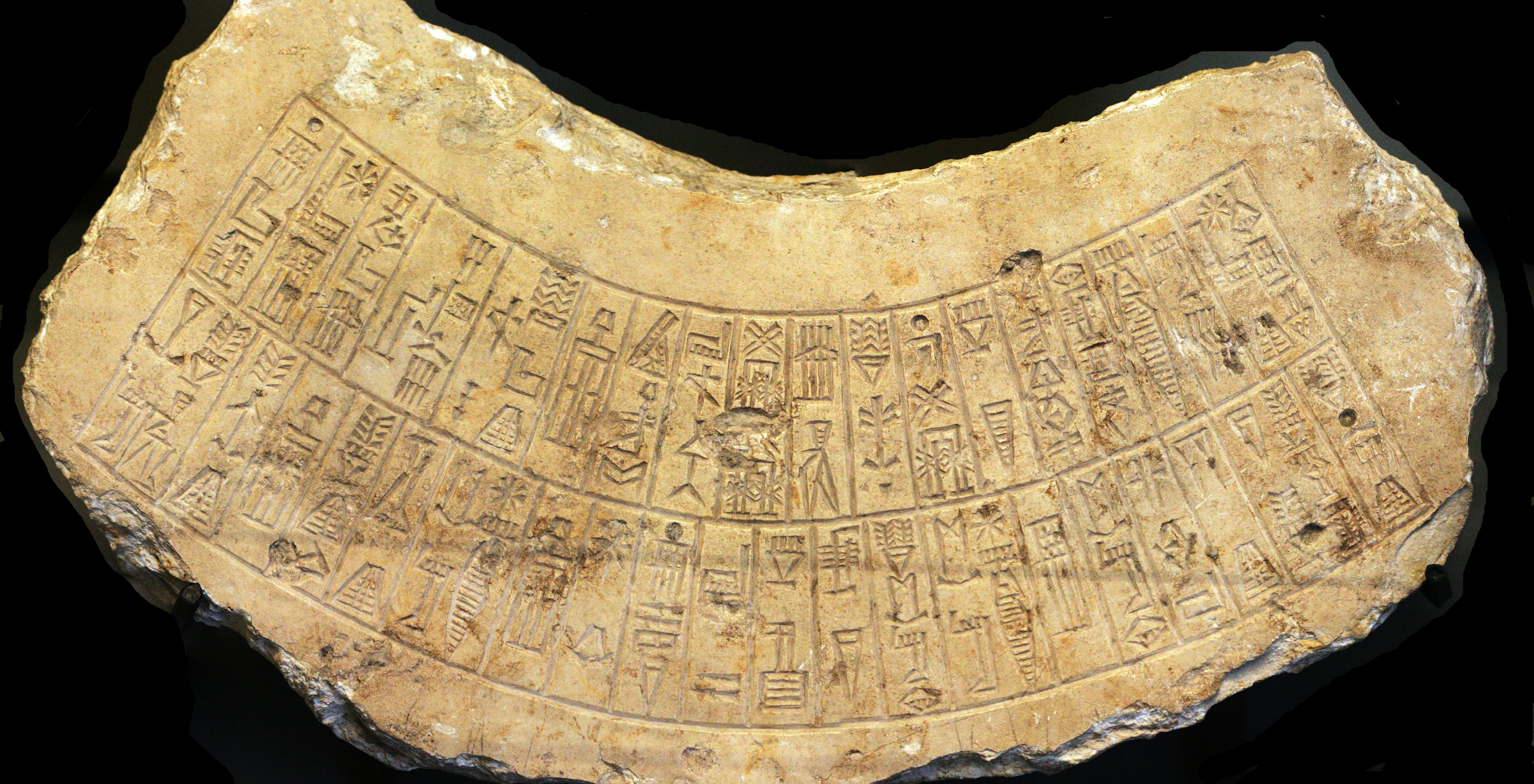
Inscription for Naram-Sin's temple construction in Marad by his son, Lipit-Ili

Marad was excavated by a team from the Iraqi General Directorate of Antiquities and the Qādissiyyah University in 1991 led by Na'el Hannoon, and in 2005 and 2007 led by Abbas Al-Hussainy. On the main mound a hall, thought to be a temple, was excavated on the main mound. The excavator proposed that it was the E’igikalama, Lugal-Marada the city god of Marad. Area A A was in the temple complex, Area B over a cluster of rooms found in that complex, and Area C covering part of the tenemos wall surrounding the temple complex. To the west of the mound in Area D residences from the Old Babylonian period were found. During the latter excavation about 40 inscribed objects were found including 21 cuneiform tablets, mainly from the Isin-Larsa and Old Babylonian periods but a few from Neo-Babylonian times, primarily in area B. The temple are had been much damaged by looters. Most recently excavation occurred in Autumn 2019. A few more cuneiform tablets were found (5 complete, 3 almost complete, 8 small pieces), clay tags, and envelope fragments. The epigraphics, economic/legal in nature, included dates of Marad ruler Sumu-numhim and Babylon ruler Sumu-la-EL (years 27 and 28). After a survey, a trench was excavated in a small tell on the western end of the site which showed three occupation layers ranging from Early Dynastic III through Akkadian, Isin-Larsa and Old-Babylonian. A number of Parthian era graves were found across the site. In 2023 two trenches (Area B and Area J) were excavated and a number of cuneiform tablets and fragments were found. Most of the texts were from the Old Babylonian period Ilum-bāni archives, previously known from looted objects, involving the business aspects of date palm cultivation.

== See also ==
- Cities of the ancient Near East
- Kazallu
- Manana Dynasty
