= Ishbi-Erra =

Ishbi-Erra 𒀭𒅖𒁉𒀴𒊏

King of Isin
- Reign: c. 2018 - c. 1985 BC
- Predecessor: Position established
- Successor: Shu-Ilishu
- Died: c. 1985 BC
- Dynasty: First Dynasty of Isin

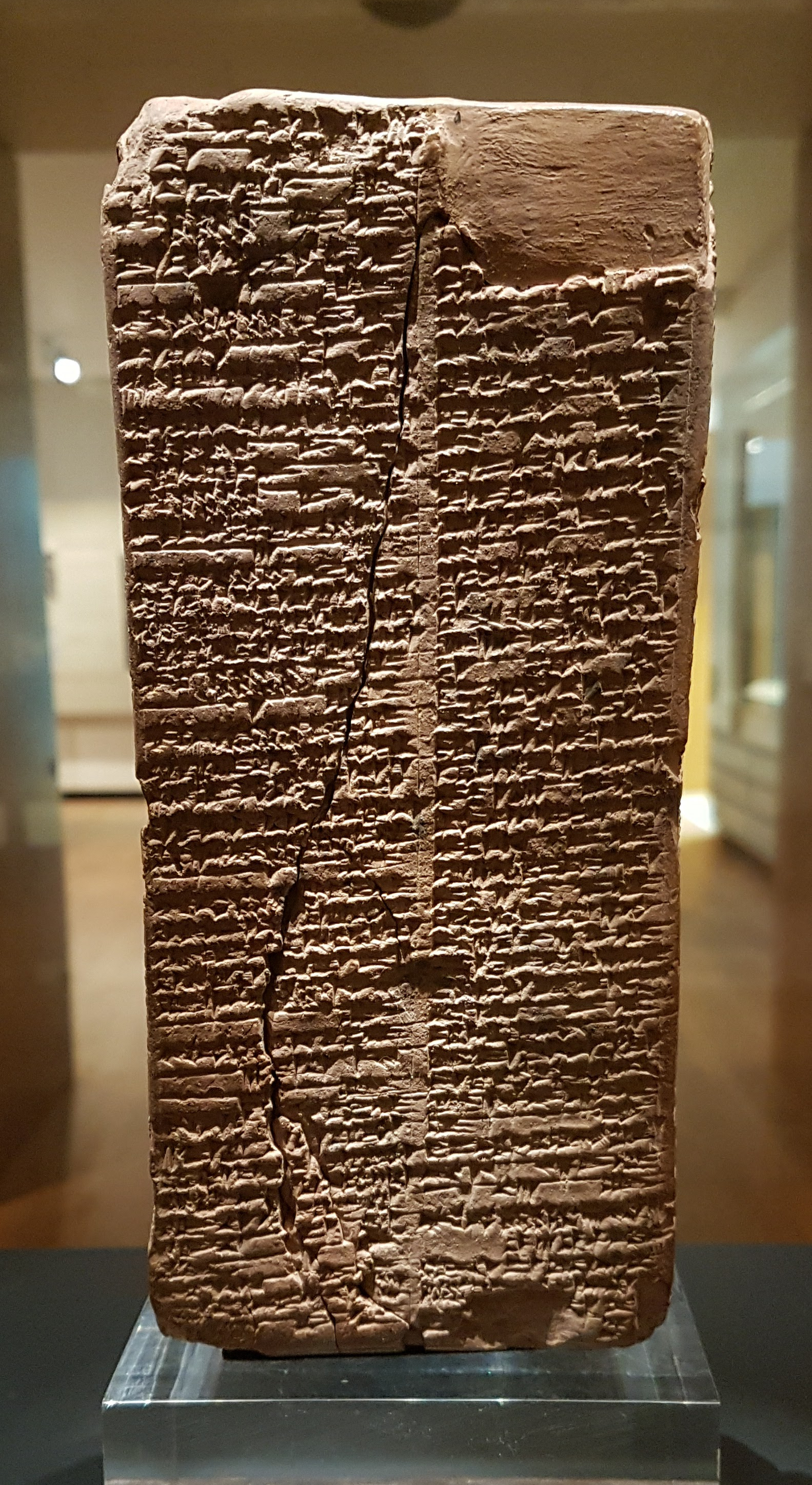
Ishbi-Erra appears in the Sumerian King List, on the Weld-Blundell Prism

Ishbi-Erra (Akkadian: 𒀭𒅖𒁉𒀴𒊏 ^{d}iš-bi-ir₃-ra; died c. 1985 BC) was the founder of the dynasty of Isin, reigning from c. 2018 — c. 1985 BC. Ishbi-Erra was preceded by Ibbi-Sin of the 3rd Dynasty of Ur in ancient Lower Mesopotamia, and then succeeded by Shu-Ilishu. According to the Weld-Blundell Prism, (Note: WB 444, the Weld-Blundell prism, r. 33.) Išbi-erra reigned for 33 years and this is corroborated by the number of his extant year-names. While in many ways this dynasty emulated that of the preceding one, its language was Akkadian as the Sumerian language had become moribund in the latter stages of the third dynasty of Ur.

== Biography ==
Map detailing the full territorial extent of the third dynasty of Ur in Mesopotamia just before the treason of Ishbi-Erra c. 2017 BC (MC). Map oriented approximately towards the northwest.

=== Early Career ===
At the outset of his career, Ishbi-Erra was an official working for Sumerian King Ibbi-Sin, the last king of the 3rd Dynasty of Ur. Ishbi-Erra was described as a man of Mari, (Note: Tablet UM 7772.) either his origin or the city for which he was assigned. His progress is recorded in letters to the king and to the governor of Kazallu (Puzur-Numushda, later renamed Puzur-Šulgi). These are literary letters, copied in antiquity as scribal exercises and their authenticity is unknown. Charged with acquiring grain in Isin and Kazallu, Ishbi-Erra complained that he could not ship the 72,000 GUR he had bought for 20 talents of silver—apparently an exorbitant price—and now kept secure in Isin to other conurbations due to the incursions of the Amorites ("Martu") and requested Ibbi-Sin supply 600 boats to transport it while also requesting governorship of Isin and Nippur. (Note: CBS 2272, letter from Išbi-erra to Ibbi-Sin.) Although Ibbi-Sin baulked at promoting him, Ishbi-Erra apparently succeeded in wrestling control over Isin by Ibbi-Sin's 8th year, when he began assigning his own regnal year-names, and thereafter an uneasy chill descended on their relationship.

=== Fall of Ur III ===
Ibbi-Sin bitterly lambasted Ishbi-Erra as being "not of Sumerian seed" in his letter to Puzur-Šulgi and opined that: "Enlil has stirred up the Amorites out of their land, and they will strike the Elamites and capture Ishbi-Erra." Puzur-Šulgi seems to have originally been one of Ishbi-Erra's own messengers and indicated the extent to which loyalties were in flux during the waning years of the regime of the third dynasty of Ur. While there was no outright conflict, Ishbi-Erra continued to extend his influence as Ibbi-Sin's steadily declined over the next 12 years or so, until Ur was finally conquered by Kindattu of Elam.

=== Reign ===
Ishbi-Erra went on to win decisive victories against the Amorites in his 8th year and the Elamites in his 16th year. Some years later, Ishbi-Erra ousted the Elamite garrison from Ur, thereby asserting suzerainty over Sumer and Akkad, celebrated in one of his later 27th year-name, although this specific epithet was not used by this dynasty until the reign of Iddin-Dagan. He readily adopted the regal privileges of the former regime, commissioning royal praise poetry and hymns to deities, of which seven are extant, and proclaiming himself Dingir-kalam-ma-na, "a god in his own country." (Note: Tablets NBC 6421. 7087. 7387.) He appointed his daughter, En-bara-zi, to succeed that of Ibbi-Sin's as Egisitu(priestess of An), celebrated in his 22nd year-name. He founded fortresses and installed city walls, but only one royal inscription is extant. (Note: IM 58336, Construction of a great lyre for Enlil.)

Various hymns to Ishbi-Erra, king of Isin, are known.

Preceded by Position established	King of Isin c. 2018 - c. 1985 BC	Succeeded by Shu-Ilishu

== See also ==
- Sumer
- History of Sumer
- List of Mesopotamian dynasties
- Chronology of the ancient Near East
