= Kazallu =

Ancient human settlement

Kazalla or Kazallu (Ka-zal-lu^{ki}) is the name given in Akkadian sources to a city in central Mesopotamia whose specific location is unknown. Its patron god was Numushda and his consort Namrat. There are indications that the god Lugal-awak was believed to be located in Kazallu. The city disappears from history with the fall of the Old Babylonian Empire circa 1595 BC.

Kazallu is mentioned in the Sumerian literary composition Lament for Sumer and Ur:

"Kazallu, the city of teeming multitudes, was cast into confusion. Numucda took an unfamiliar path away from the city, his beloved dwelling. His wife Namrat, the beautiful lady, was lamenting bitterly. "Alas, the destroyed city, my destroyed house," she cried bitterly. Its river bed was empty, no water flowed. Like a river cursed by Enki its opening channel was dammed up. On the fields fine grains grew no more, people had nothing to eat. The orchards were scorched like an oven, its open country was scattered. The four-legged wild animals did not run about. The four-legged creatures of Cakkan could find no rest. Lugal-Marda stepped outside his city."

== History ==
=== Early Bronze Age ===
==== Akkadian Period ====
Under its king Kashtubila, Kazalla warred against Sargon of Akkad in the 24th or 23rd century BC. Sargon laid the city of Kazalla to waste so effectively that "the birds could not find a place to perch away from the ground." This particular story was written a millennium or more after the fact and is considered a literary composition. The second ruler of the Akkadian Empire, Rimush, suppressed a revolt by Kazallu reporting:

"Rimus, king of the world — the god Enlil did indeed grant kingship to him. ... Thereupon, on his return, Kazallu revolted. He conquered it and [wi]thin Kazallu (itself) struck down 12,052 men. He took 5,862 captives. Further, he captured Ašarēd, governor of Kazallu and destroyed its (Kazallu's) wall. ... "

A number of land grant inscriptions, the predecessors of Kudurrus, from the reign of Manishtushu the third king of the Akkadian Empire, mention feasts occurring in Kazallu and people from Kazallu. Kazallu also joined the "great revolt" led by Kish against the 4th Akkadian ruler Naram-Sin. Naram-Sin crushed the revolt and in an inscription mentioned defeating "Puzur-Numusda, governor of Kazallu".

==== Ur III period ====
It is unclear how that governor relates to the one under Ur III. The city was briefly under the control of Elam under Puzur-Inshushinak until Elam fell to Ur with the first Ur III ruler, Ur-Nammu writing "Then: Umma, Marda, Šubur, Kazallu, and their settlements, and whatsoever was oppressed by Anšan, verily, I established their freedom". Under the Ur III empire, the city was ruled by ensi (governors). Some of them, Ititi (appointed in 28th year of Shulgi), Izariq (S31), Kallamu (S43), Šu-Mama (S47), and Apillaša (appointed in year 7 of Amar-Suen continuing until at least year 5 of Shu-Sin), are known by name. It has been suggested that Su-Mama and Apillaša had a period of co-regency. There is a letter from Ibbi-Sin, the last ruler of Ur III, and Puzur-Numušda 1 who he had made governor of Kazallu, complaining that he (Girbubu, governor of Girkal, a city associated with Kazaalu in a geographic list) was not doing enough to oppose Ishbi-Erra, ruler of Isin. A notable letter sent to Ibbi-Sin reads:

"To Ibbi-Suen, my king, speak what Ishbl-Erra, your servant, says: I was charged with an expedition to Isin and Kazallu to buy grain. Grain is (now) reaching the rate of one gur (for) each (shekel) and the 20 talents of silver for buying grain have been spent. ... Now the Martus in their entirety have entered the interior of the country taking one by one all the great fortresses. ...

The year name 12 of Ur III ruler Shulgi was "Year Numushda of Kazallu was brought into his temple".

=== Middle Bronze ===
==== Isin-Larsa period ====
In the Isin-Larsa period, between the fall of the Ur III empire until Hammurabi finally establishes supremacy for Babylon in the region, Kazallu is often mentioned in the conflicts of that time. In the early 2nd millennium BC the city had a number of conflicts with Larsa. A year name of Sin-Iqisham records "Year (Sin-iqiszam) made (statues) of / for Numuszda, Namrat and Lugal-apiak and brought them into the city of Kazallu". The 2nd year name of Warad-Sin reads "Year the city wall of Kazallu was destroyed and the army of Mutibal occupying Larsa was smitten by weapons". Larsa ruler Kudur-Mabuk also reports repelling the forces of Kazullu. A ruler of Isin, Erra-imitti, also claimed to have destroyed Kazullu. And Rîm-Anum, ruler of Uruk, reports in a year name "Year in which Rim-Anum the king defeated the land of Emutbal, the troops of Esznunna, Isin and Kazallu who marched together against him to make booty ... which was not counted since ancient times ... and defeated them".

==== Old Babylonian period ====
Kazallu briefly became a city-state in its own right before falling to Babylon. The 4th year name of Sumu-El states the defeat of Kazallu ie "Year Akusum was destroyed and the army of Kazallu was smitten by weapons". His 15th year name reports that again ie "Year Sumuel the king defeated with his weapons the army of Kazallu and his king". The 13th year name of Babylonian ruler Sumu-abum lists the actual destruction or destruction of Kazallu ie "Year Sumu-abum seized/destroyed Kazallu". After the fall of the First Babylonian Empire the city of Kazallu is no longer recorded in history. One Kazully ruler from this period, Yaḫzir-el, is known. He briefly controlled the city of Sippar and is in the 25th year name of Sumu-la-El "Year: Yaḫzir-El was defeated by weapons".

== Location ==
According to a tablet from the reign of Gudea of Lagash, Kazallu was located somewhere to the west of Mesopotamia, in the land of Martu. According to a letter to Ibbi-Sîn the Martu were hindering travel between Ur and Kazallu. Some scholars today believe it was only about 15 km from the city of Babylon, and just west of the Euphrates. In texts from Drehem the city is said to be to the east of the unlocated city of Girtab. Old Babylonian records have it as being in the area of Marad (modern Tell as-Sadoum). Another researcher has suggested that Kazallu can be found "in the area east or southeast of Dilbat". And yet another "likely modern Azragiya on the Euphrates located 4 kms northwest of Fallujah".

== See also ==
- Cities of the ancient Near East
- List of Mesopotamian dynasties
