= Adab (city) =

Ancient Sumerian city between Girsu and Nippur

Bismaya
- Adab (Sumerian)
- Bismya
- Location within Iraq
- 31°56′50.1″N 45°37′34.5″E
- Location: Al-Qādisiyyah Governorate, Iraq
- Region: Mesopotamia

Site notes
- Excavation dates: 1885, 1890, 1902, 1903–1905, 2001, 2016-2019
- Archaeologists: W.H. Ward, J.P. Peters, W. Andrae, E.J. Banks, Nicolò Marchetti

Adab (Sumerian: 𒌓𒉣𒆠 Adab^{ki}, spelled UD.NUN^{KI}) was an ancient Sumerian city between Girsu and Nippur, lying about 35 kilometers (22 miles) southeast of the latter. It was located at the site of modern Bismaya or Bismya in the Al-Qādisiyyah Governorate of Iraq. It lies on the eastern branch of the extinct ancient course of the Tigris River. The site was occupied at least as early as the 3rd millennium BC, through the Early Dynastic, Akkadian Empire, and Ur III Empire periods, into the Kassite period in the mid-2nd millennium BC. It is known that there were temples of Ninhursag/Digirmah, Iskur, Asgi, Inanna and Enki at Adab and that the city-god of Adab was Parag'ellilegarra (Panigingarra) "The Sovereign Appointed by Enlil". The site has been subject ot extensive illicit digging and systematic looting with more than 18,000 illicit pits dotting it.

Bismaya is not to be confused with the small, later (Old Babylonian and Sassanian periods) archaeological site named Tell Bismaya, 9 kilometers (5.6 miles) east of the confluence of the Diyala and the Tigris rivers, excavated by Iraqi archaeologists in the 1980s or Tell Basmaya, southeast of modern Baghdad, excavated by Iraqi archaeologists in 2013-2014.

== Archaeology ==
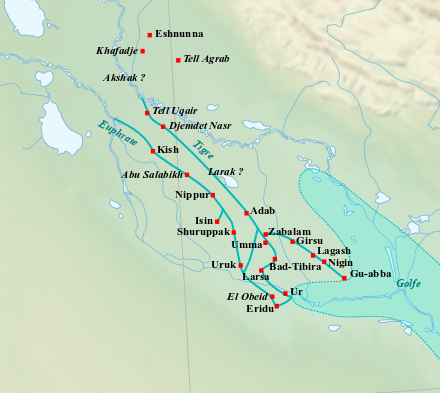
Early Dynastic Cities

The 460-hectare site consists of a number of mounds distributed over an area about 1.5 kilometres (0.93 mi) long and 3 kilometres (1.9 mi) wide, consisting of a number of low ridges, nowhere exceeding 12 metres (39 ft) in height, lying somewhat nearer to the Tigris than the Euphrates, about a day's journey to the southeast of Nippur. It was surrounded by a double wall. In total, there are twelve mounds of which two (Mounds X and XII) are the result of sand dredged from the Iturungal canal, though some rooms and 20 tablets were found on the northern extension of X. Persons reported working on mound XIV and mound XVI but there is no record where they lay. Some private houses were noted outside the east wall. Notable mounds were

- Mound I - Palace, Isin/Larsa - Old Babylonian Periods. About 33 meters by 25 meters. Several hundred mostly fragmentary tablets
- Mound II - Cemetery and House by Bath. Seven burials (5 intramural graves, 2 tombs).
- Mound III - Administrative and light industrial near west corner. Early Dynastic, Akkadian, and Ur III levels. Most tablets found there date to reign of Akkadian Empire ruler Shar-kali-sharri.
- Mound IV - The Library. Over 2,000 tablets found here, originally held in reed baskets with labels. Akkadian period administrative center.
- Mound V - E-Sar/E-mah Temple. Mound 11 meters high and 90 meters in circumference. Ten occupation levels, atop pure sand, ranging from Early Dynastic I to Ur III. Inscribed bricks of Kurigalzu indicated restoration in the Kassite period. Two consecutive temples were built with the first ritually sealed before construction of the second.
- Mound VI - Large walls with inscribed bricks of Amar-Sin. Thought to be a temple.

Initial examinations of the site of Bismaya were by William Hayes Ward of the Wolfe Expedition in 1885 and by John Punnett Peters of the University of Pennsylvania in 1890, each spending a day there and finding one cuneiform tablet and a few fragments. Walter Andrae visited Bismaya in 1902, found a tablet fragment and produced a sketch map of the site.

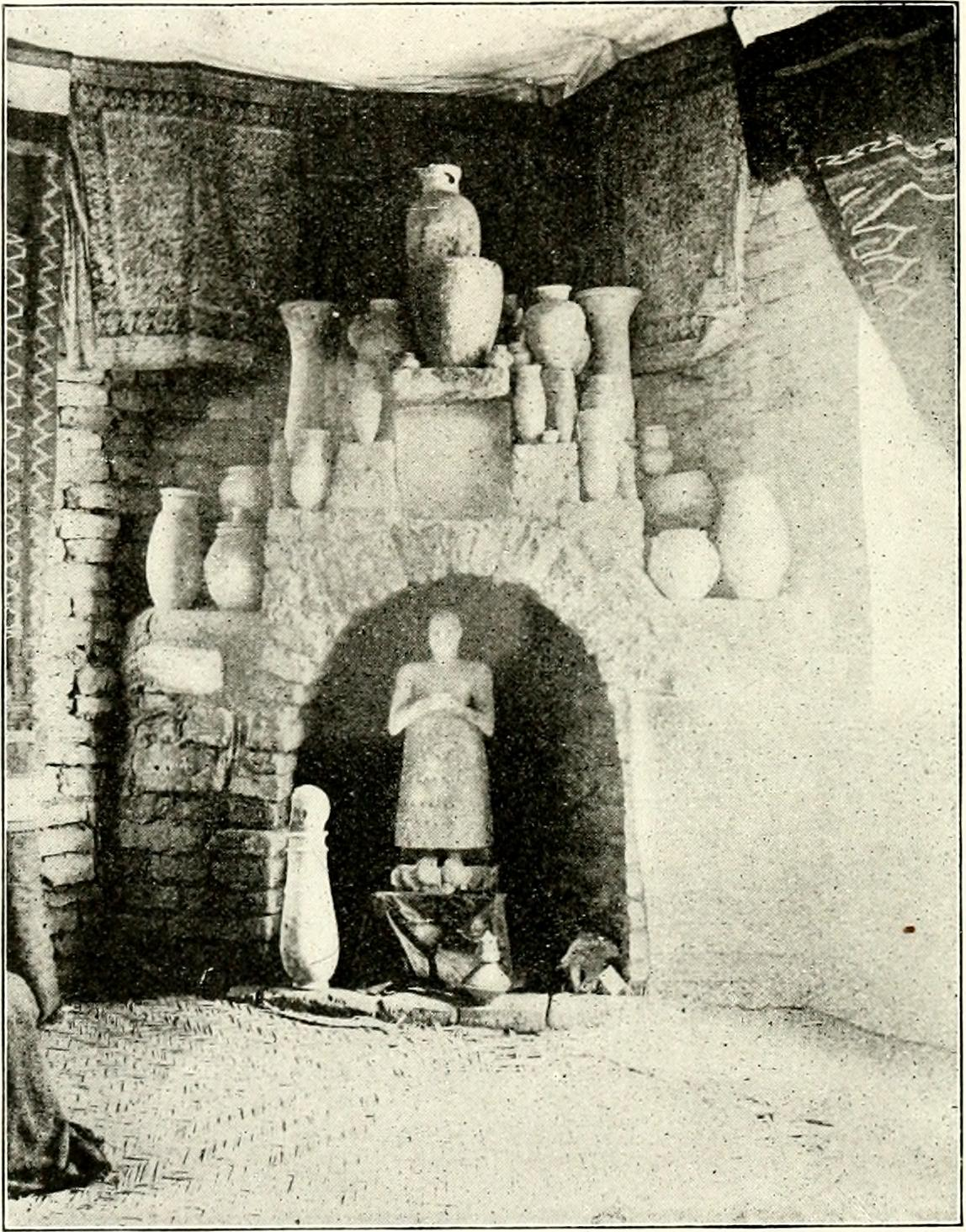
Statue of Lugaldalu. The Open court

Excavations were conducted there on behalf of the University of Chicago and led by Edgar James Banks for a total of six months beginning on Christmas Day of 1903 until May 25, 1904. Work resumed on September 19, 1904 but was stopped after 8 1/2 days by the Ottoman authorities. Excavation resumed on March 13, 1905 under the direction of Victor S. Persons and continued until the end of June, 1905. During the excavation of a city gate thousands of sling balls (some stone, most of baked clay), some flattened, were found which the excavator interpreted as the result of a battle. While Banks was better trained than the earlier generation of antiquarians and treasure hunters and used more modern archaeological methods the excavations suffered seriously from having never been properly published. The Banks expedition to Bismaya was well documented by the standards of the time and many objects photographed though no final report was ever produced due to personal disputes. In 2012, the Oriental Institute re-examined the records and objects returned to the institute by Banks and produced a "re-excavation" report. One issue is that Banks and Persons purchased objects from Adab locally while there and it is uncertain which object held at the museum were excavated vs being bought.

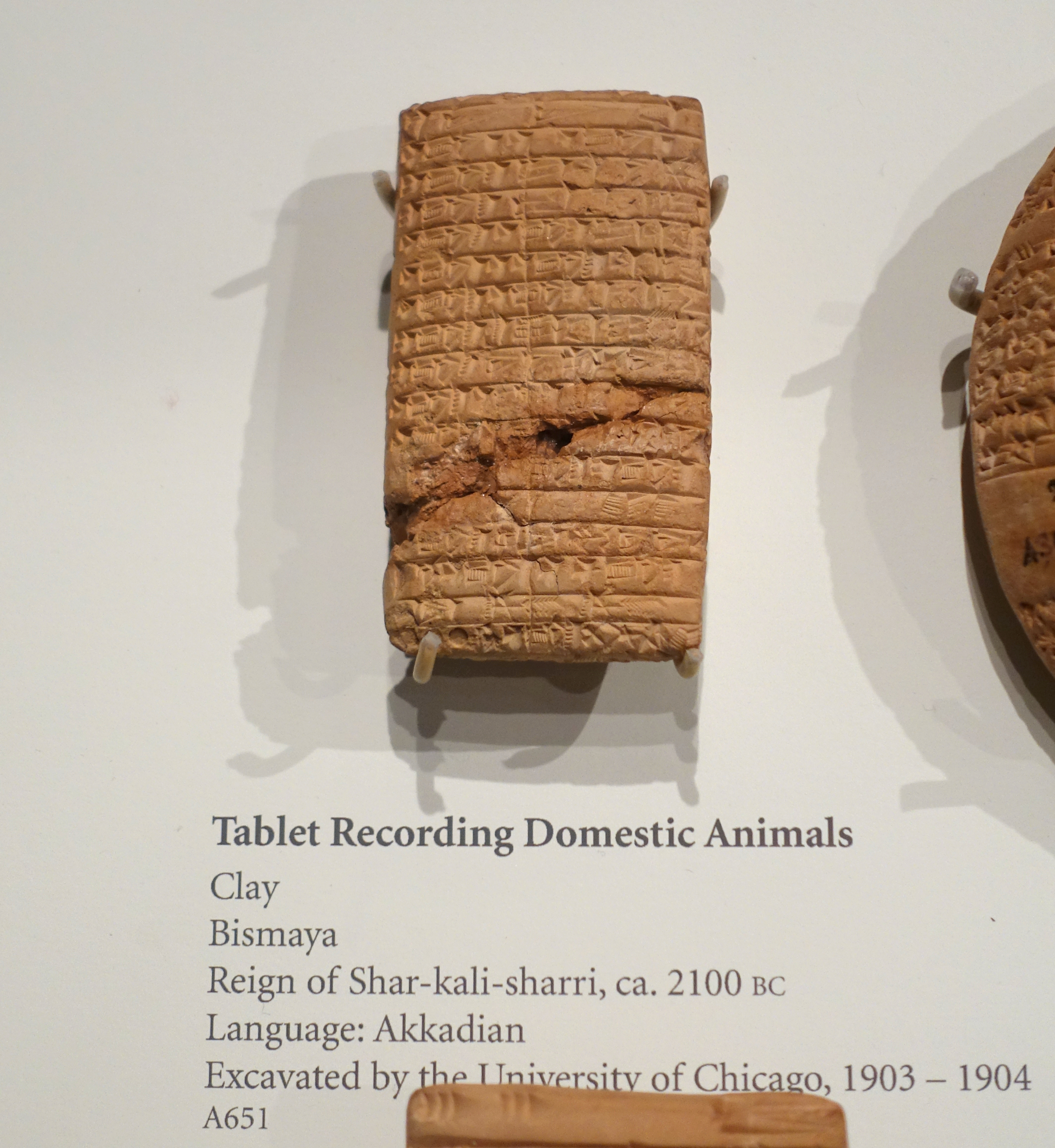
Tablet in Akkadian language recording domestic animals, Bismaya, reign of Shar-kali-sharri, c. 2100 BC, clay, Oriental Institute Museum

On Mound V, on what was originally thought to be an island but has since been understood to have resulted from a shift in the canal bed, stood the temple, E-mah, with a ziggurat. The temple had two occupational phases. E-Sar, the first (Earlier Temple), constructed of plano-convex bricks, was from the Early Dynastic period. That temple was later filled in with mud bricks and sealed off with a course of baked brick and bitumen pavement. A foundation deposit of Adab ruler E-iginimpa'e dated to Early Dynastic IIIa was found on that pavement containing "inscribed adze-shaped copper object (A543) with a copper spike (A542) inserted into the hole at its end and two tablets, one of copper alloy (A1160) and one of white stone (A1159)".

𒀭𒈤 𒂍𒅆𒉏𒉺𒌓𒁺 𒃻𒑐𒋼𒋛 𒌓𒉣𒆠 𒂍𒈤 𒈬𒈾𒆕 𒌫𒁉𒆠𒂠 𒋼𒁀𒋛

^{d}-mah/ e2-igi-nim-pa-e3/ GAR-ensi/ adab{ki}/ e2-mah mu-na-du/ ur2-be2 ki-sze3/ temen ba-si

"For the goddess Digirmah, E-iginimpa'e, ensi-GAR of Adab, built the E-Mah for her, and buried foundation deposits below its base"

The second temple (Later Temple) was faced by baked bricks, some with an inscription of the Ur III ruler Shulgi naming it the temple of the goddess Ninhursag.

Adab was evidently once a city of considerable importance, but deserted at a very early period, since the ruins found close to the surface of the mounds belong to Shulgi and Ur-Nammu, kings of the Third Dynasty of Ur in the latter part of the third millennium BC, based on inscribed bricks excavated at Bismaya. Immediately below these, as at Nippur, were found artifacts dating to the reign of Naram-Sin and Sargon or the Akkadian Empire, c. 2300 BC. Below these there were still 10.5 metres (34 ft) of stratified remains, constituting seven-eighths of the total depth of the ruins. A large palace was found in the central area with a very large well lined with plan-convex bricks, marking it as being from the Early Dynastic period.

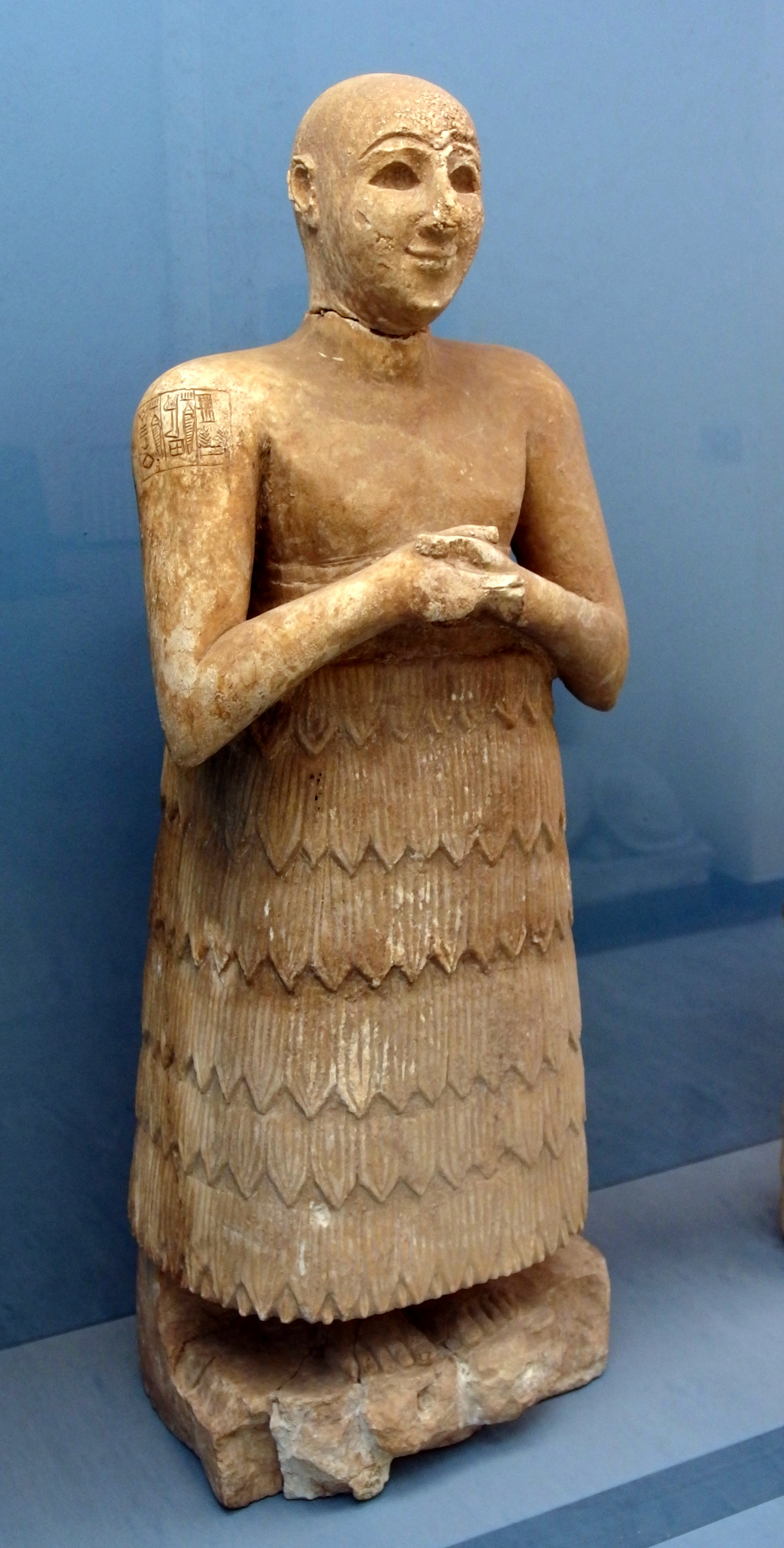
Statue of Lugal-dalu, King or Governor of Adab in the 3rd millennium BC. He is not listed in the Sumerian King List. An inscription on the shoulder identifies him, and he is wearing the Kaunakes

Besides the remains of buildings, walls, and graves, Banks discovered a large number of inscribed clay tablets of a very early period, bronze and stone tablets, bronze implements and the like. Of the tablets, 543 went to the Oriental Institute and roughly 1100, mostly purchased from the locals rather than excavated, went to the Istanbul Museum. The latter are still unpublished and are unavailable for study. Brick stamps, found by Banks during his excavation of Adab state that the Akkadian ruler Naram-Sin built a temple to Inanna at Adab, but the temple was not found during the dig, and is not known for certain to be E-shar. The two most notable discoveries were a complete statue in white marble, apparently the earliest yet found in Mesopotamia, now in the Istanbul Archaeology Museums, bearing the inscription, translated by Banks as "E-mach, King Da-udu, King of, Ud-Nun", now known as the statue of Lugal-dalu and a temple refuse heap, consisting of great quantities of fragments of vases in marble, alabaster, onyx, porphyry and granite, some of which were inscribed, and others engraved and inlaid with ivory and precious stones.

Of the Adab tablets that ended up at the University of Chicago, sponsor of the excavations, all have been published and also made available in digital form online. After the end of excavation, on a later personal trip the region in 1913, Banks purchased thousands of tablets from a number of sites, many from Adab, and sold them sold piecemeal to various owners over years. Some have made their way into publication. Many more have subsequently made their way into the antiquities market from illegal looting of the site and some have also been published. A number ended up in the collection of the Cornell University.

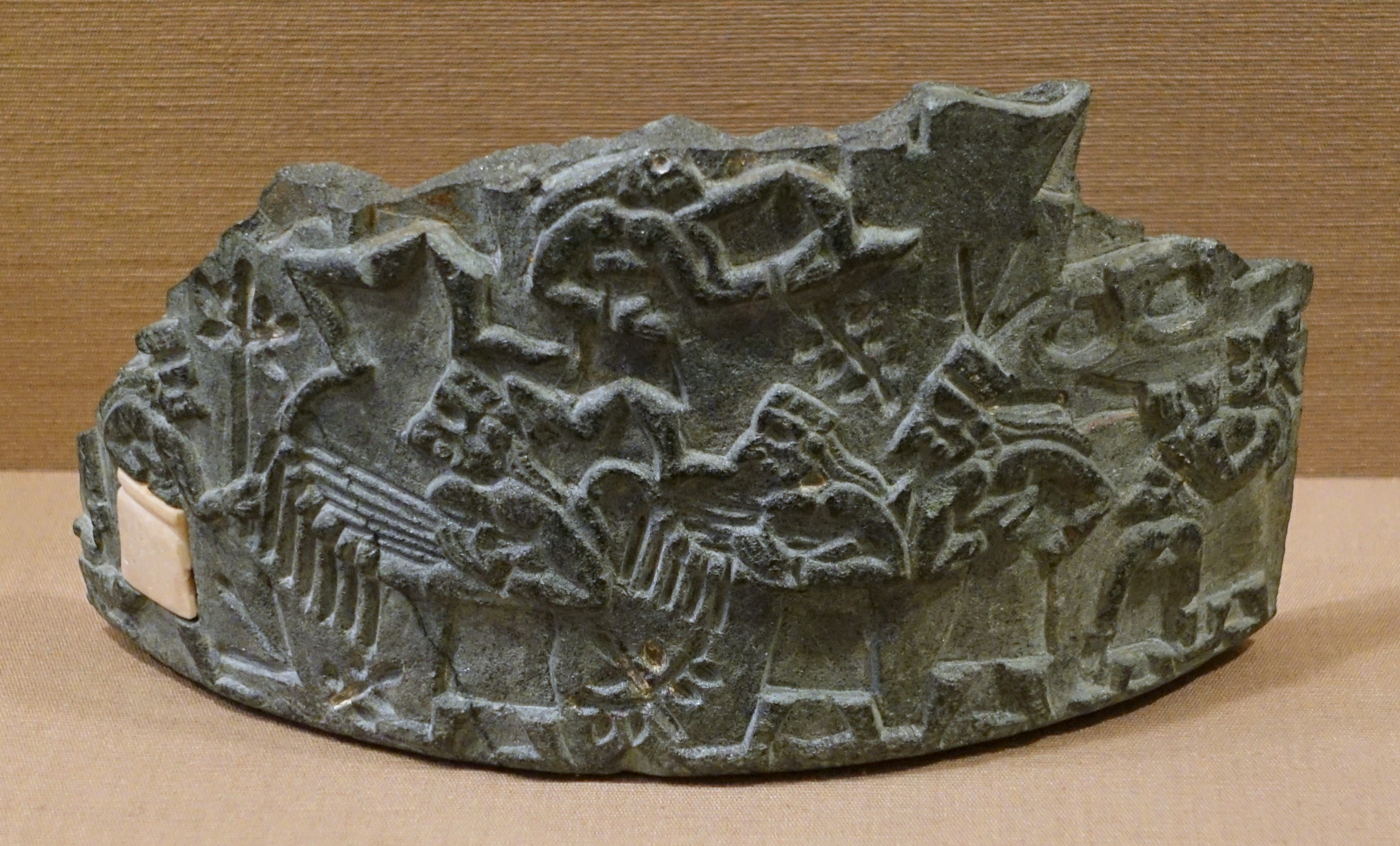
Vessel with musical procession, Bismaya, Mound V, Temple, Early Dynastic period, 2700-2500 BC, chlorite, alabaster inlay, Oriental Institute Museum

In response to widespread looting which began after the war 1991, the Iraq State Board of Antiquities and Heritage conducted an excavation at Adab in 2001. The site has now been largely destroyed by systematic looting which increased after the war in 2003, so further excavation is unlikely. On the order of a thousand tablets from that looting, all from the Sargonic Period, have been sold to various collectors and many are being published, though missing archaeological context. Of the 9,000 published tablets from the Sargonic Period (Early Dynastic IIIb, Early Sargonic, Middle Sargonic and Classic Sargonic) about 2,300 came from Adab.

From 2016 to 2019, the University of Bologna and the Iraqi State Board of Antiquities and Heritage led by Nicolò Marchetti conducted a program, the Qadis survey, of coordinated remote sensing and surface surveys in the Qadisiyah province including at Bismaya (QD049). Results included a "Preliminary reconstruction of the urban layout and hydraulic landscape around Bismaya/Adab in the ED III and Akkadian periods". A previously unknown palace was discovered and the extent of looting identified. It was determined that the city was surrounded by canals. The overall occupation of the site in the Early Dynastic III period was determined to have been 462 hectares. The Qadis survey showed that Adab had a 24-hectare central harbor, with a maximum length of 240 meters and a maximum width of 215 meters. The harbor was connected to the Tigris river via a 100-meter–wide canal. In addition to an intensive surface collection three superficial test sounding (A, B and C) were conducted at the newly identified public building in the north section of the site. It dated to the Early Dynastic IV period (Akkadian Empire).

In 2001 a statue became available to the Baghdad Museum which was inscribed "Temple Builder, of the goddess Nin-SU(?)-KID(?): Epa'e, King of Adab".

== History ==
Adab is mentioned in late 4th millennium BC texts found at Uruk but no finds from that period have been recovered from the site.

=== Early Bronze Age ===
==== Early Dynastic Period ====
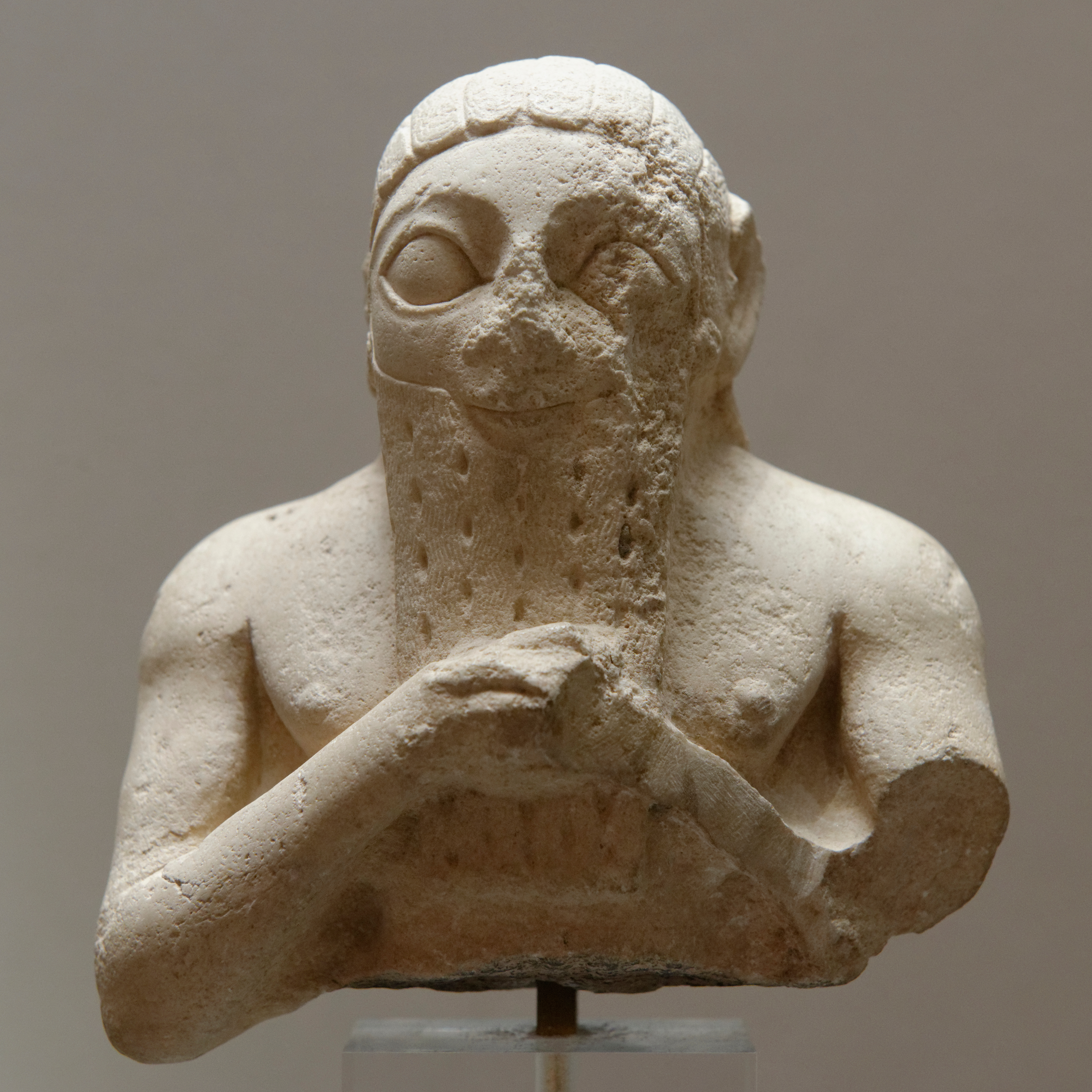
Male bust, perhaps Lugal-kisal-si, king of Uruk. Limestone, Early Dynastic III from Adab

Adab was occupied from at least the Early Dynastic Period. According to Sumerian text Inanna's descent to the netherworld, there was a temple of Inanna named E-shar at Adab during the reign of Dumuzid of Uruk. In another text in the same series, Dumuzid's dream, Dumuzid of Uruk is toppled from his opulence by a hungry mob composed of men from the major cities of Sumer, including Adab.

A king of Kish, Mesilim, appears to have ruled at Adab, based on inscriptions found at Bismaya. One inscription, on a bowl fragment reads "Mesilim, king of Kish, to Esar has returned[this bowl], Salkisalsi being patesi of Adab". One king of Adab, Lugal-Anne-Mundu, appearing in the Sumerian King List, is mentioned in few contemporary inscriptions; some that are much later copies claim that he established a vast, but brief empire stretching from Elam all the way to Lebanon and the Amorite territories along the Jordan. Adab is also mentioned in some of the Ebla tablets from roughly the same era as a trading partner of Ebla in northern Syria, shortly before Ebla was destroyed by unknown forces.

A marble statue was found at Bismaya inscribed with the name of another king of Adab, variously translated as Lugal-daudu, Da-udu, and Lugaldalu. An inscription of Eannatum, ruler of Lagash was also found at Adab.

==== Akkadian period ====
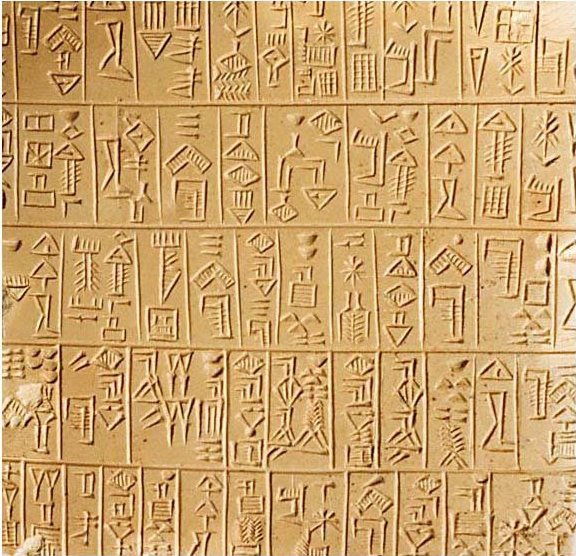
Sumerian 26th BC Adab, "Gifts from the High and Mighty of Adab to the High Priestess"

Meskigal, governor of Adab under Lugalzagesi of Uruk, changed allegiance to Akkad and became governor under Sargon of Akkad. He later joined other cities including Zabalam in a rebellion against Rimush son of Sargon and second ruler of the Akkadian Empire and was defeated and captured. About 380 of the published tablets from Adab date to the time of Meskigal (ED IIIB/Early Sargonic). This rebellion occurred during the first two regnal years of Rimush. A year name of Rimush reads "The year Adab was destroyed" and an inscription reads "Rimus, king of the world, was victorious over Adab and Zabala in battle and struck down 15,718 men. He took 14,576 captives". Various governors, including Lugal-gis, Sarru-alli, Ur-Tur, and Lugal-ajagu then ruled Adab under direct Akkadian control. About 1000 tablets from this period (Middle Sargonic) have been published. In the time of Sargon's grandson Naram-Sin Adab, again joined a "Great Rebellion" against Akkad and was again defeated. In the succeeding period (Classical Sargonic) it is known that there were temples to Ninhursag/Digirmah (E-Mah), Iskur, Asgi, Inanna and Enki. By the end of the Akkadian period, Adab was occupied by the Gutians, who made it their capital. Enheduanna, daughter of Sargon and first known poet, wrote a number of temple hymns including one to the temple of the goddess Ninhursag and her son Ashgi at Adab.

A cuneiform text lays out the adjudication of a boundary dispute between Adab and Umma by Naram-Sin of Akkad (c. 2255–2218 BC). It lists the governor under Akkad of Umma as Šubur-Nagarpae and the governor of Adab as Lugal-ša. This is the first attestation of both. The decision was witnessed by the "city elders" of Adab, Tallani, Ibrat, and Pašime.

==== Ur III Empire ====
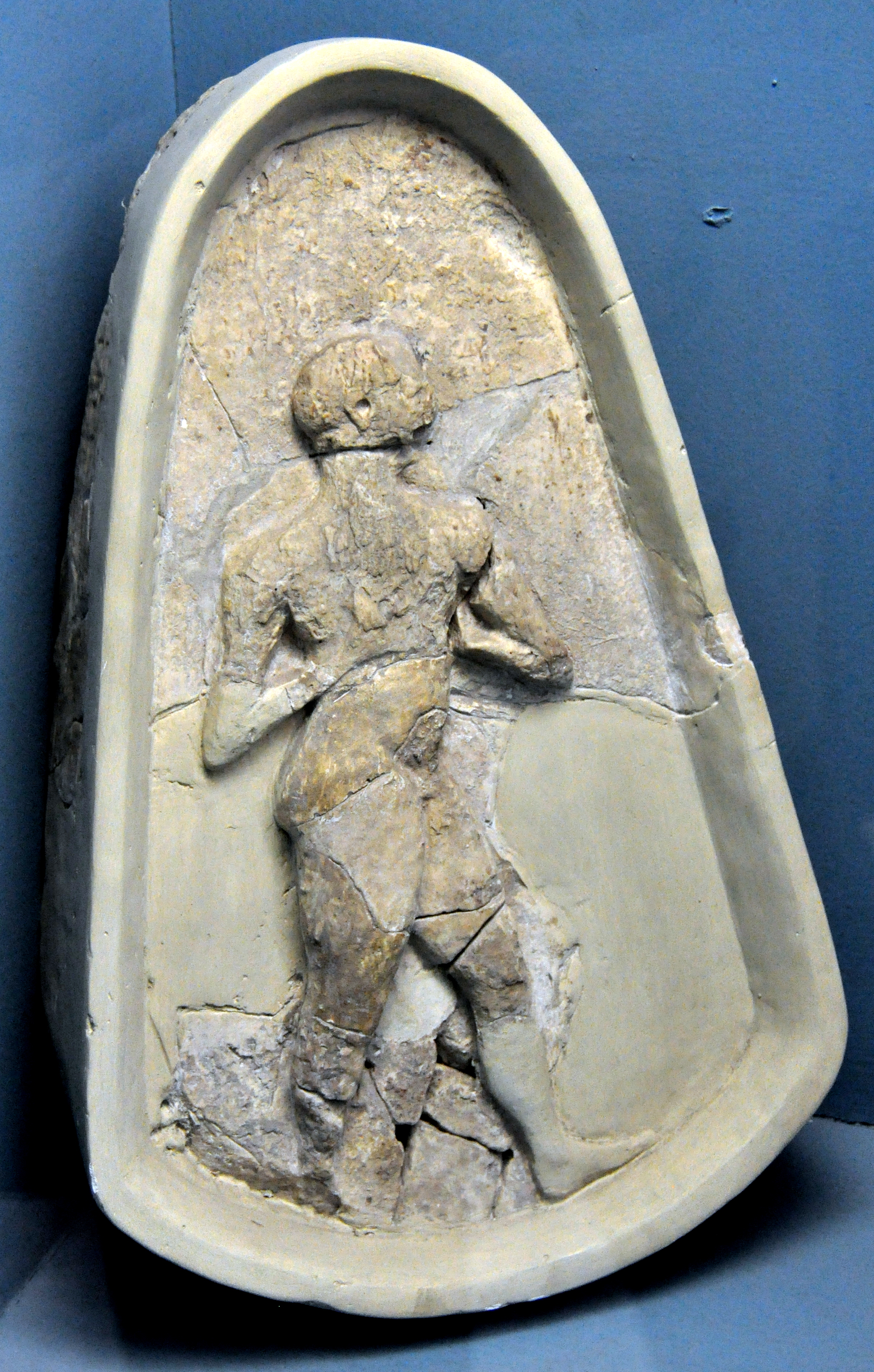
Relief of a naked priest, from Adab, Iraq, early dynastic period. Museum of the Ancient Orient, Turkey

Several governors of the city under Ur III are also known including Ur-Ašgi and Habaluge under Ur III ruler Shulgi (and Amar-Sin) and Ur-Asgi II under Shu-Sin. Ur-Ašgi is known to have had four sons, Habaluge, Nitasaga, Bidu-isa, and Lu-Utu with the first of those succeeding him as governor and the other three becoming scribes. Habaluge is known to have had two sons, Lu-melam and Ur-Šulgira with the latter becoming a later governor of Adab during the time of Ibbi-Sin. A brick inscription found at Adab marked Shulgi dedicating a weir to the goddess Ninhursag. Inscribed bricks of Amar-Sin were also found at Adab. A temple for the deified Shi-Sin was built at Adab by Habaluge.

"Sü-Sín, beloved of the god Enlil, the king whom the god Enlil lovingly chose in his (own) heart, mighty king, king of Ur, king of the four quarters, his beloved god, Habaluge, governor of Adab, his servant, built for him his beloved temple."

=== Middle Bronze Age ===
==== Old Babylonian period ====
About 200 inscribed objects, mainly tablets but also a few bricks and clay sealings, from the Old Babylonian period of the early 2nd millennium BC from Adab are known. The city of Adab is also mentioned in the Code of Hammurabi (c. 1792 – c. 1750 BC). There is a Sumerian language comic tale, dating to the Old Babylonian period, of the Three Ox-drivers from Adab. Inscribed bricks of the Kassite dynasty ruler Kurigalzu I (c. 1375 BC) were found at Adab, marking the last verified occupation of the site.

== List of rulers ==
The Sumerian King List (SKL) names only one ruler of Adab (Lugalannemundu). The following list should not be considered complete:

Depiction	Name	Succession	Title	Approx. dates	Notes
Early Dynastic IIIa period (c. 2600 – c. 2500 BC)
Empire of Lugal-Ane-mundu of Adab (c. 2600 – c. 2340 BC)
"Then Ur was defeated and the kingship was taken to Adab." — SKL
	Lugal-Anne-Mundu 𒈗𒀭𒉌𒈬𒌦𒆕	Unclear succession	King of the Four Quarters of the World King of Sumer King of Adab	Uncertain; this ruler may have fl. c. 2600 – c. 2340 BC sometime during the Early Dynastic (ED) III period (90 years)	Known from the SKL and other inscriptions
"1 king; he ruled for 90 years. Then Adab was defeated and the kingship was taken to Mari." — SKL
Depiction	Name	Succession	Title	Approx. dates	Notes
	Lumma 𒈝𒈠	Unclear succession	Governor of Adab	Uncertain; this ruler may have fl. c. 2600 – c. 2500 BC sometime during the Early Dynastic (ED) IIIa period	
	Nin-kisalsi 𒎏𒆦𒋛	Unclear succession	Governor of Adab	reigned c. 2500 BC	temp. of: Mesilim
	Medurba 𒈨𒄙𒁀	Unclear succession	King of Adab	Uncertain; these two rulers may have fl. c. 2600 – c. 2500 BC sometime during the ED IIIa period	temp. of: Ur-Pabilsag
	Epa'e 𒂍𒉺𒌓𒁺	Unclear succession	King of Adab	Uncertain; these two rulers may have fl. c. 2600 – c. 2500 BC sometime during the ED IIIa period	temp. of: Meskiagnun
Depiction	Name	Succession	Title	Approx. dates	Notes
Early Dynastic IIIb period (c. 2500 – c. 2350 BC)
	Lugal-dalu 𒈗𒁕𒇻	Unclear succession	King of Adab	r. c. 2500 BC	temp. of: Ur-Nanshe
	Paraganedu 𒁈𒃶𒉌𒄭	Unclear succession	Governor of Adab	Uncertain; this ruler may have fl. c. 2500 – c. 2400 BC sometime during the EDIIIb period	temp. of: Akurgal
	E-iginimpa'e 𒂍𒅆𒉏𒉺𒌓𒁺	Unclear succession	Governor of Adab	r. c. 2400 BC	temp. of: Ush
	Mug-si 𒈮𒋛	Unclear succession	Governor of Adab	r. c. 2400 BC	temp. of: Enakalle
	Ursangkesh	Unclear succession		Uncertain; these two rulers may have fl. c. 2400 – c. 2350 BC sometime during the EDIIIb period	temp. of: Lugal-kinishe-dudu
	Enme'annu	Unclear succession		Uncertain; these two rulers may have fl. c. 2400 – c. 2350 BC sometime during the EDIIIb period	temp. of: Enannatum II
Depiction	Name	Succession	Title	Approx. dates	Notes
Proto-Imperial period (c. 2350 – c. 2270 BC)
	Hartuashgi	Unclear succession		Uncertain; these two rulers may have fl. c. 2350 – c. 2270 BC sometime during the Proto-Imperial period	temp. of: Urukagina
	Meskigal 𒈩𒆠𒅅𒆷	Unclear succession	Vassal governor of Adab under Umma and (later) Akkad	Uncertain; these two rulers may have fl. c. 2350 – c. 2270 BC sometime during the Proto-Imperial period	temp. of: Lugalzagesi; Sargon; Rimush
Depiction	Name	Succession	Title	Approx. dates	Notes
Akkadian period (c. 2270 – c. 2154 BC)
	Sarru-alli	Unclear succession	Vassal governor under Akkad	r. c. 2270 BC	temp. of: Manishtushu
	Lugal-ajagu 𒈗𒀀𒈬	Unclear succession	Vassal governor of Adan under Akkad	r. c. 2250 BC	temp. of: Naramsuen
	Lugal-gis 𒈗𒄑	Unclear succession	Vassal governor of Adab under Akkad	r. c. 2220 BC	temp. of: Sharkalisharri
	Ur-tur 𒌨𒀭𒌉	Unclear succession	Vassal governor of Adab under Akkad	r. c. 2200 BC	temp. of: Sharkalisharri
	Amar-Suba 𒀫𒍝𒈹	Unclear succession	Vassal governor of Adab under Akkad	r. c. 2180 BC	temp. of: Dudu
Depiction	Name	Succession	Title	Approx. dates	Notes
Gutian period (c. 2154 – c. 2119 BC)
	Urdumu	Unclear succession	Governor of Adab	Uncertain	temp. of: Gudea
Depiction	Name	Succession	Title	Approx. dates	Notes
Ur III period (c. 2119 – c. 2004 BC)
	Amar-Suba 𒀫𒍝𒈹	Unclear succession	Vassal governor of Adab under Ur	Uncertain	temp. of: Shulgi

== Gallery ==
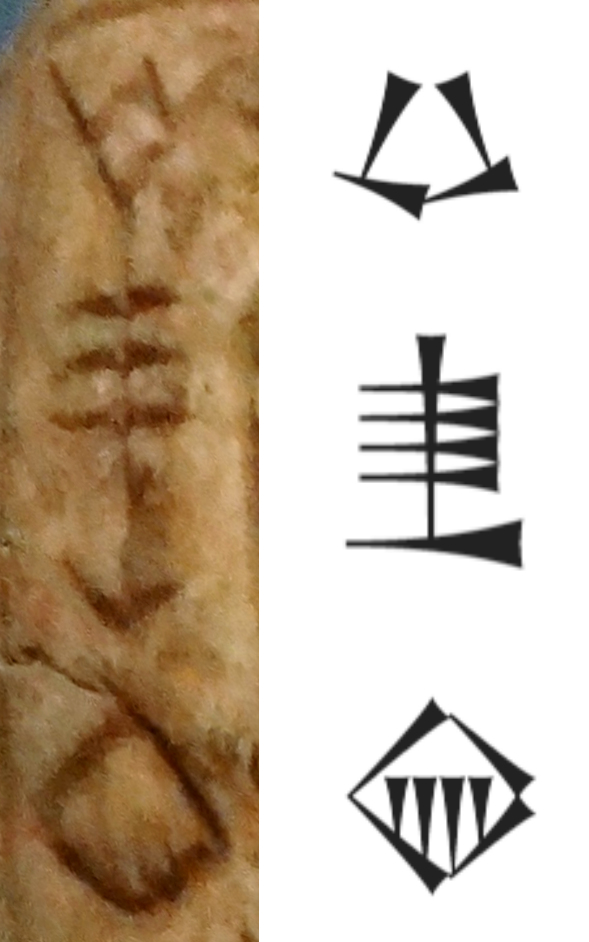
UD-NUN-KI, "City of Adab" on the statue of Lugal-dalu, with rendering in early Sumero-Akkadian cuneiform.

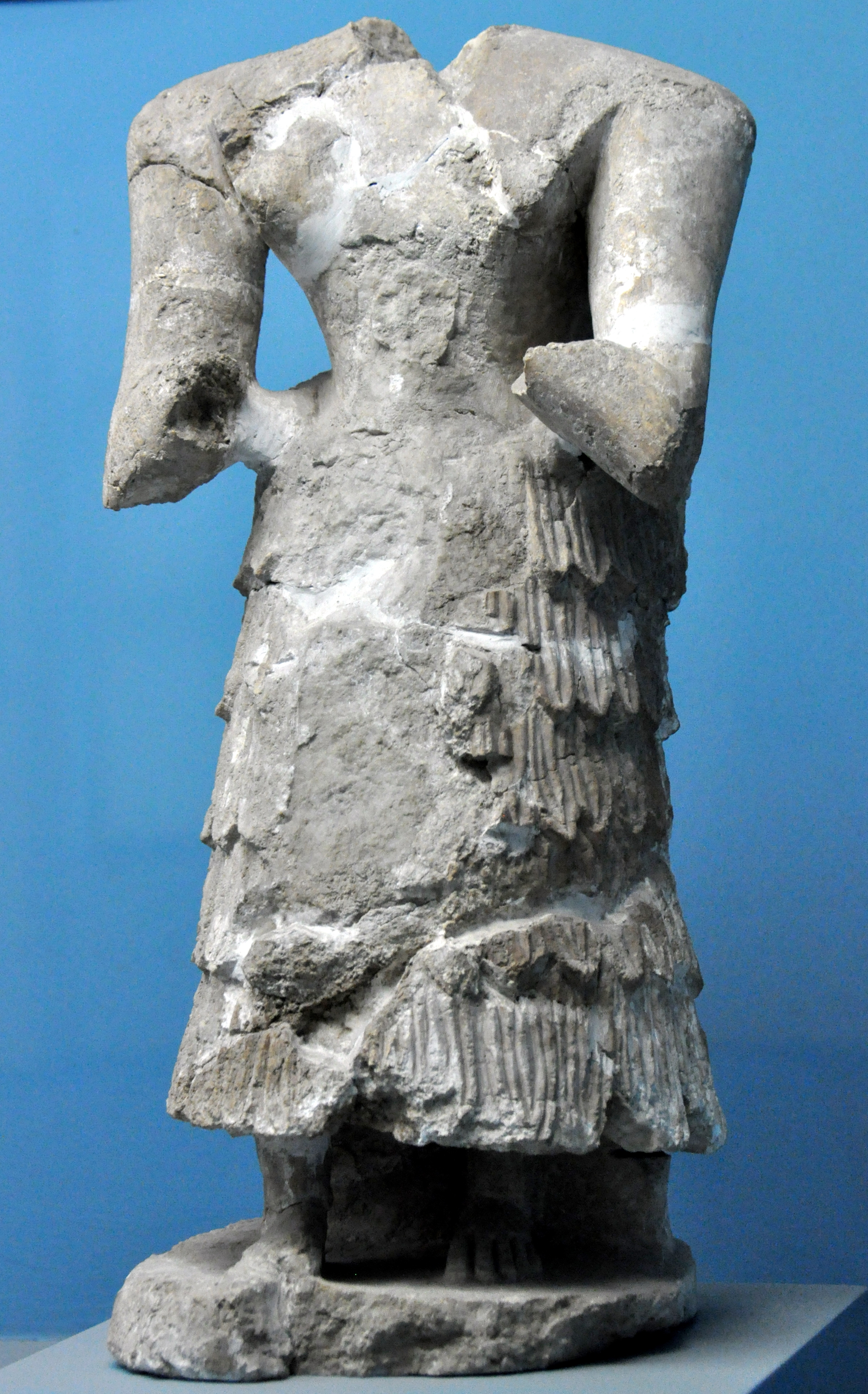
Headless votive statue, from Adab, Iraq, early dynastic period. Museum of the Ancient Orient, Turkey

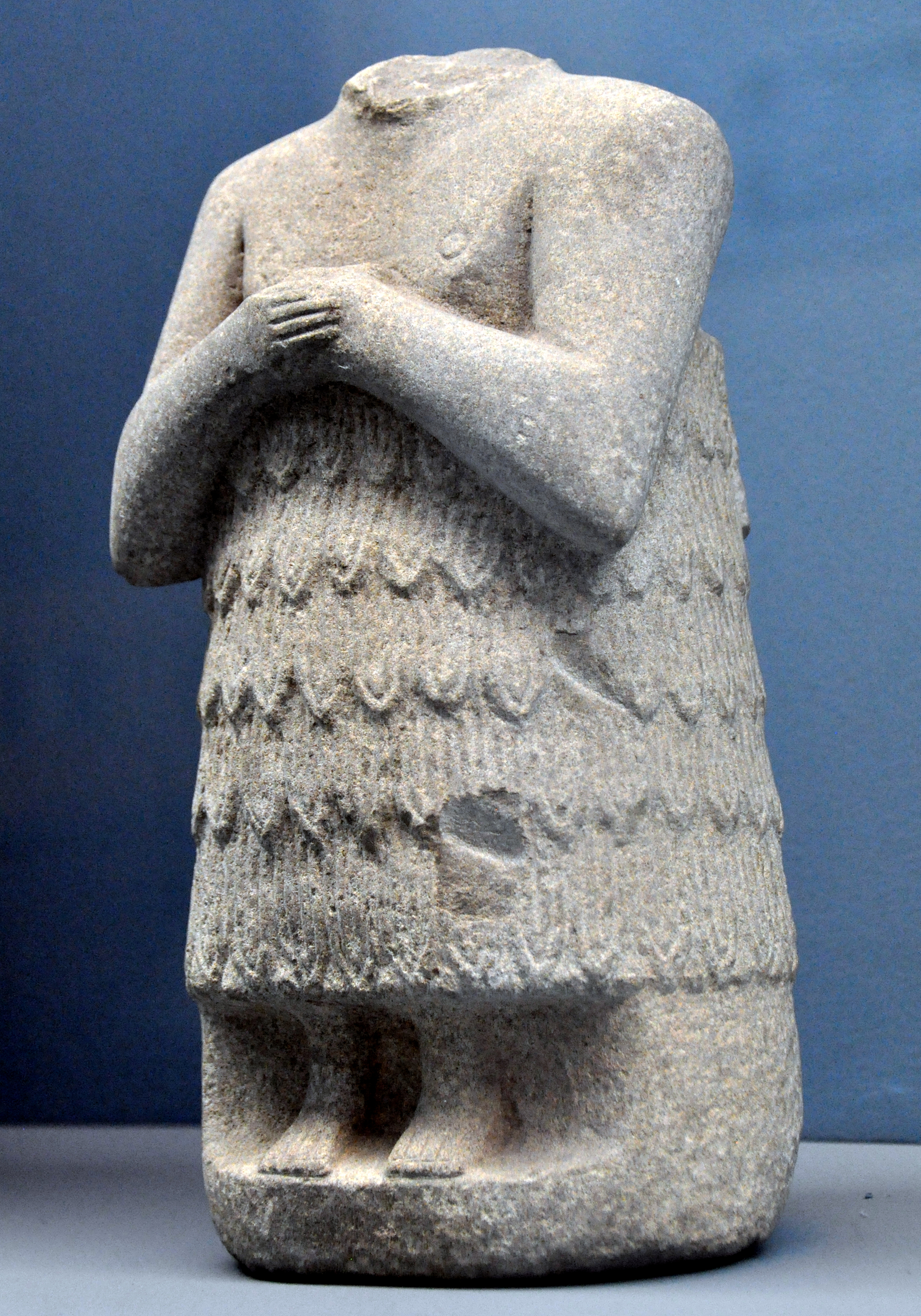
Headless votive statue, from Adab, Iraq, early dynastic period. Museum of the Ancient Orient, Istanbul

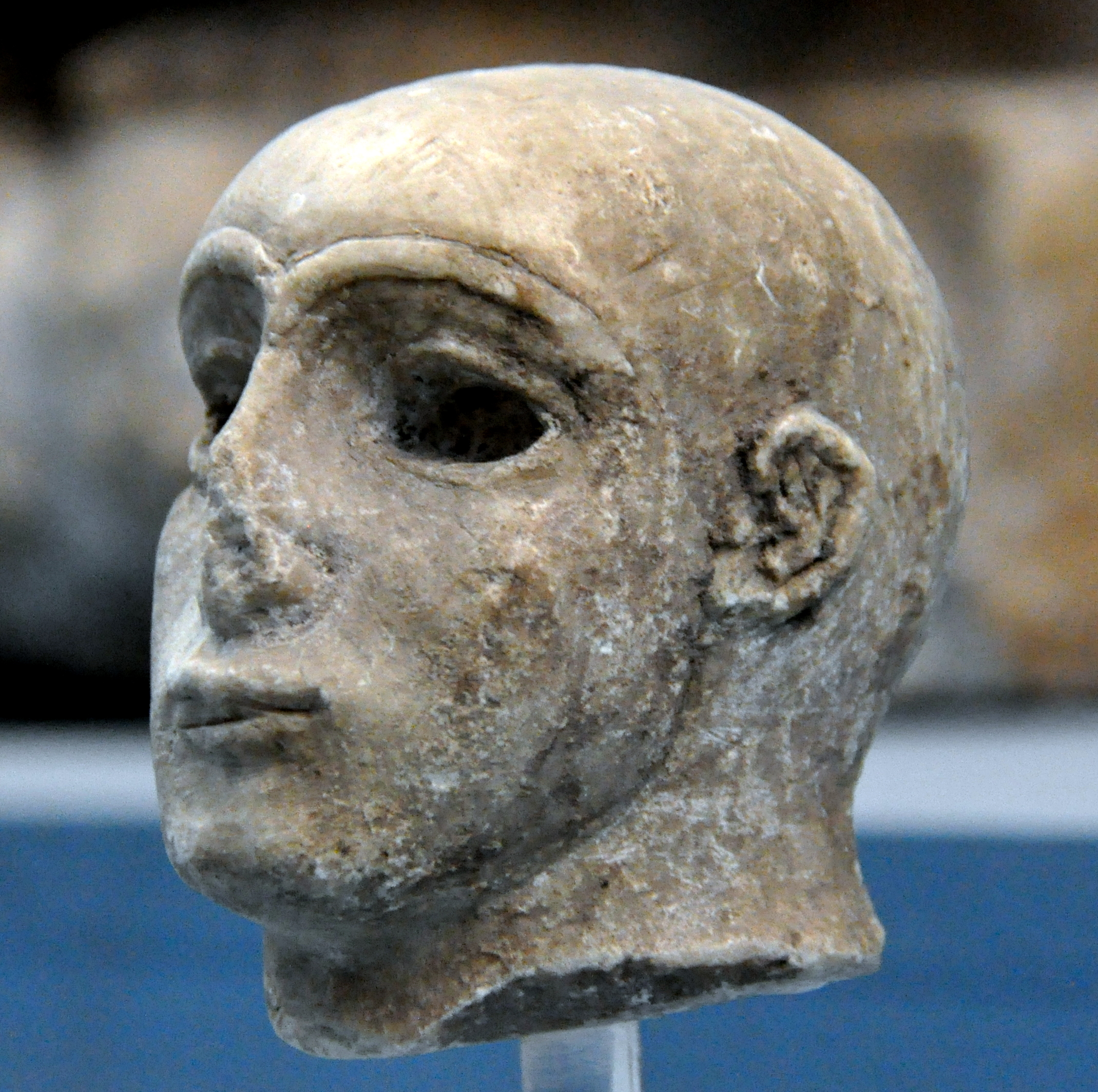
Head of a votive statue, from Adab, Iraq, early dynastic period. Museum of the Ancient Orient, Turkey

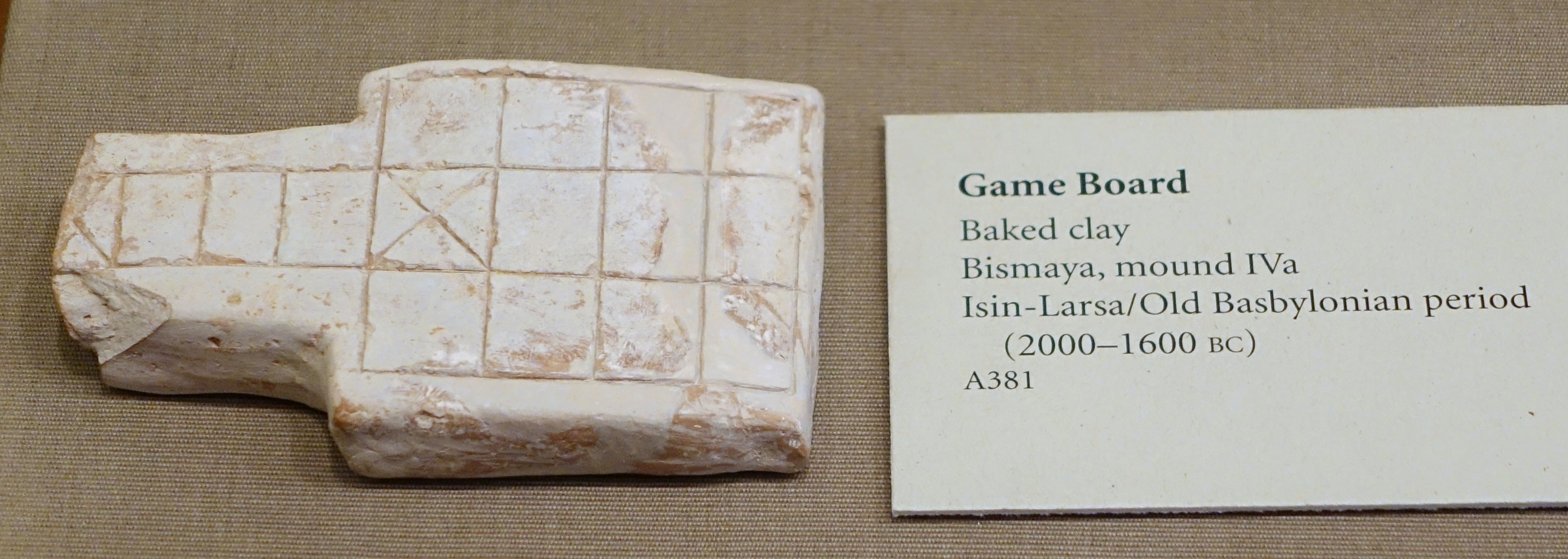
Game board, Bismaya, mound IVa, Isin-Larsa to Old Babylonian period, 2000-1600 BC, baked clay, Oriental Institute Museum

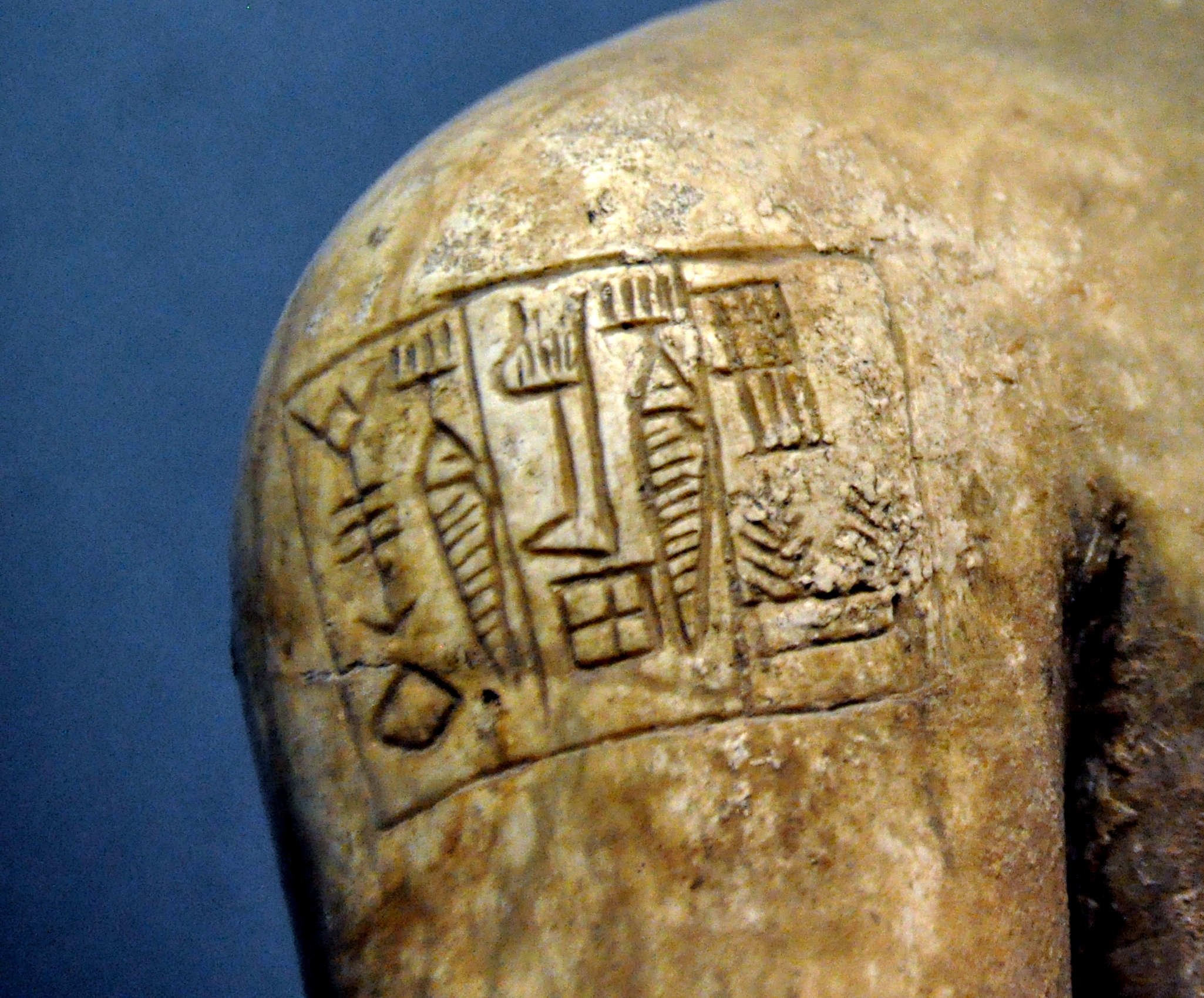
Cuneiform inscription on a statue from Adab, mentioning the name of Lugal-dalu and god ESAR of Adab

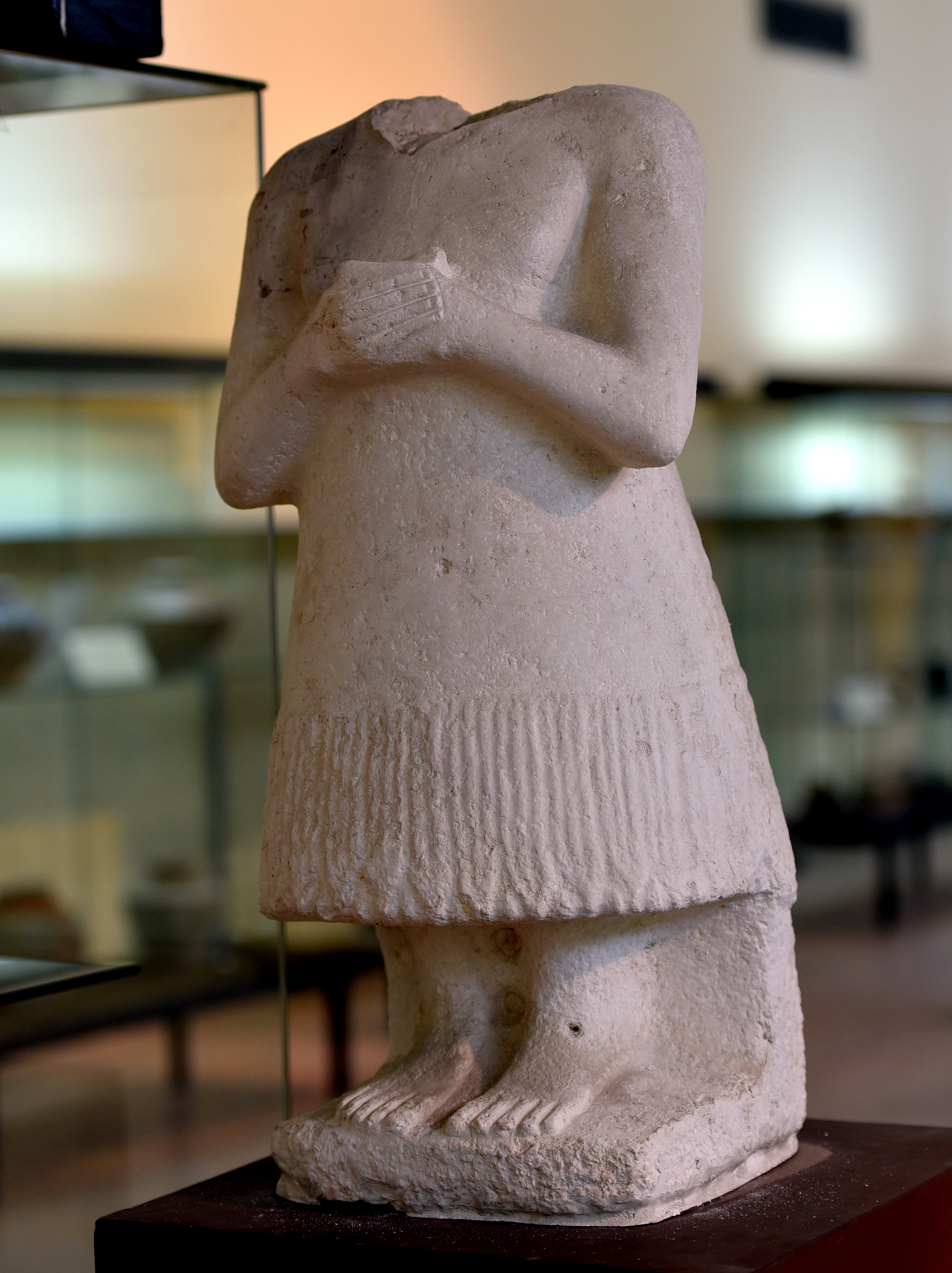
Headless statue, the name of the deity Ninshubur is mentioned on the right shoulder. From Adab. 2600-2370 BC. Iraq Museum

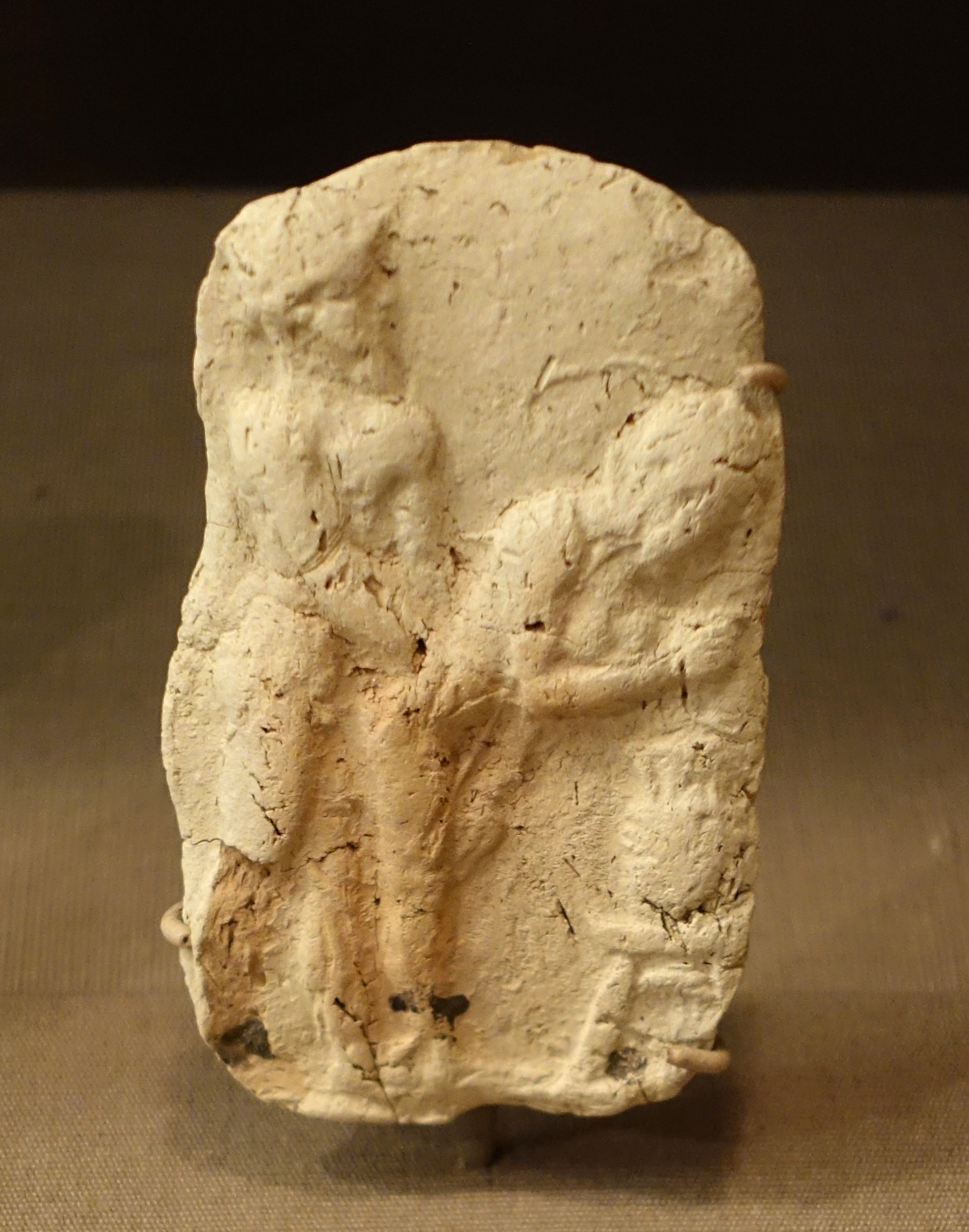
Plaque with a sexual scene, Bismaya, mound IV, Isin-Larsa to Old Babylonian period, 2000-1600 BC, baked clay, Oriental Institute Museum

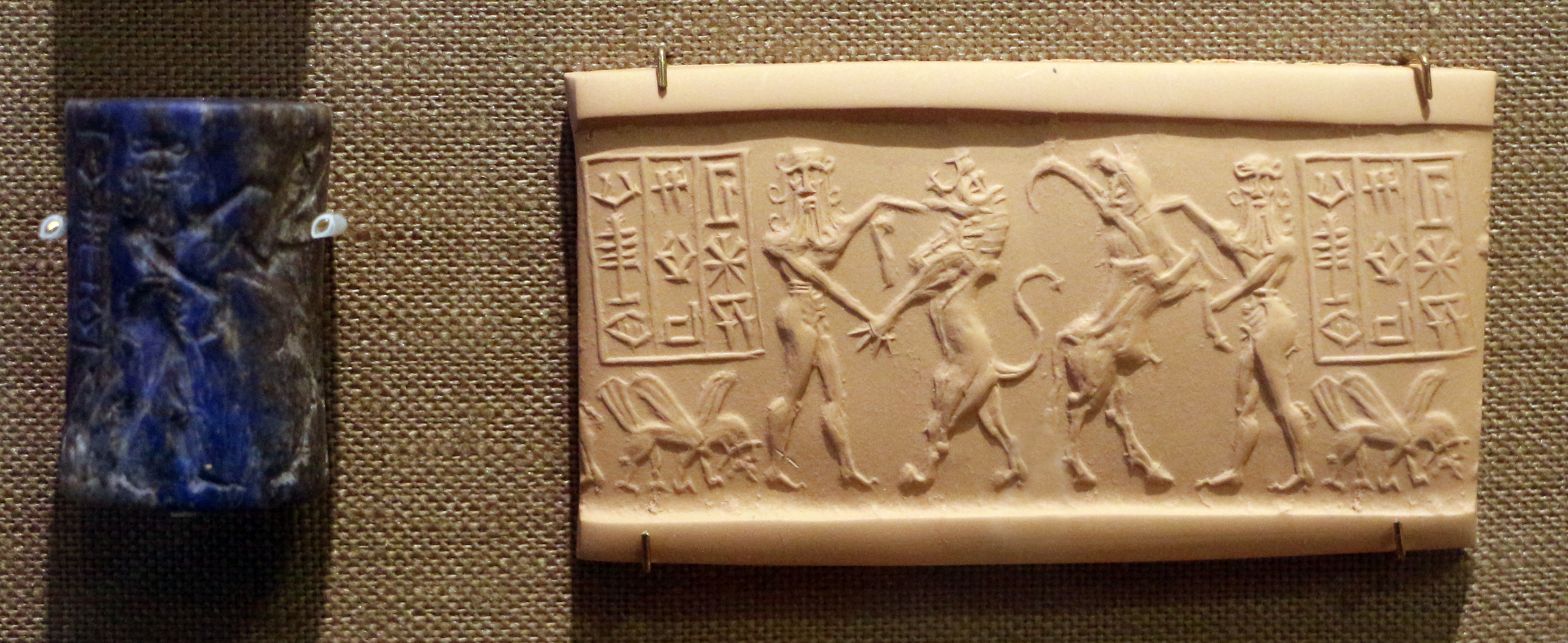
Akkadian Period, lapis lazuli seal with six-eared hero subduing a lion and a water buffalo, from Bismaya, ca. 2350-2150 BC

== See also ==
- Cities of the Ancient Near East
- Chronology of the ancient Near East
