= Mug-si =

25th-century BCE Sumerian ruler

Mug-si 𒈮𒋛

King of Adab
- Reign: c. 2400 BC
- Predecessor: Possibly Lugalannemundu
- Successor: Possibly E-iginimpa'e
- Dynasty: Dynasty of Adab
- Religion: Sumerian religion

Location of Adab

Mug-si (Sumerian: 𒈮𒋛, mug-si; fl. c. 2400 BC) was a Sumerian ruler (ensi) of the Mesopotamian city of Adab. He may have been the predecessor of E-iginimpa'e.

His title was ensi-gar, or "Supreme Governor", the highest civil office in Adab.

Mug-si is only known from inscriptions, especially a land sale document where he appears with his title.
