= Meskigal =

Sumerian king, 24th century BC

Meskigal 𒈩𒆠𒅅𒆷

King of Adab
- Reign: c. 2350 BC
- Predecessor: Possibly E-iginimpa'e
- Dynasty: Dynasty of Adab
- Religion: Sumerian religion

Location of Adab

Meskigal (Sumerian: 𒈩𒆠𒅅𒆷, mes-ki-g̃al₂-la; fl. c. 2350 BC) was a Sumerian ruler of the Mesopotamian city of Adab. He was contemporary with Lugal-zage-si and the founder of Akkad, Sargon.

== Reign ==
His reign falls mainly into the early Akkadian period.

There are fragmentary and conflicting information about Meskigal. That he originally was the governor of Adab serving king Lugalzagesi of Uruk, but then changed his allegiance to Sargon of Akkad. Later, inscriptions indicate that he participated in military expeditions under Sargon. Finally, he appear in inscriptions as a rebel against Rimush of Akkad. The timeframe here is quite extensive raising questions.

=== Reign of Lugalzagesi of Uruk ===
It has been suggested that Meskigal had actually defected to the Akkadian Empire, in opposition to Lugal-zage-si. Another known case is Lugalushumgal, who was also a collaborator of Akkad.

=== Reign of Sargon of Akkad ===
In a fragmentary inscription, he claimed to have been on an expedition to the "Mountain of the Cedar forests" (𒆳𒄑𒂞, ^{KUR}g̃eš-erin, Lebanon), perhaps together with Sargon I:

"For Ninšubur, the minister of An, for the life of Meskigal, ruler of Adab, (...) from the cedar mountains. (...) For the life of his wife and children to Ninšubur his goddess he dedicated it (this statue). Though (my) ... Prayer Have Compassion!"

— Inscription of Meskigal

=== Reign of Rimush of Akkad ===
It is uncertain if this is the same Meskigal being mentioned in these several inscriptions.

According to an inscription however, the Akkadian ruler Rimush, successor of Sargon, captured him following a rebellion:

"Rimuš, king of the world, in battle over Adab and Zabalam was victorious, and 15,718 men he struck down, and 14,576 captives he took. Further, Meskigala, governor of Adab, he captured, and Lugalgalzu, governor of Zabalam, he captured. Their cities he conquered, and their walls he destroyed. Further, from their two cities many men he expelled, and to annihilation he consigned them"

— Adab and Zabalam Inscription of Rimus.

=== The Statue of Meskigal ===
There is a statue of Meskigal in the Baghdad Museum, in a style reminiscent of Akkadian statuary. Meskigal is also known from inscriptions.
