= Lugal-dalu =

Ruler of Adab, Mesopotamia, c. 2500 BC

Lugal-dalu 𒈗𒁕𒇻
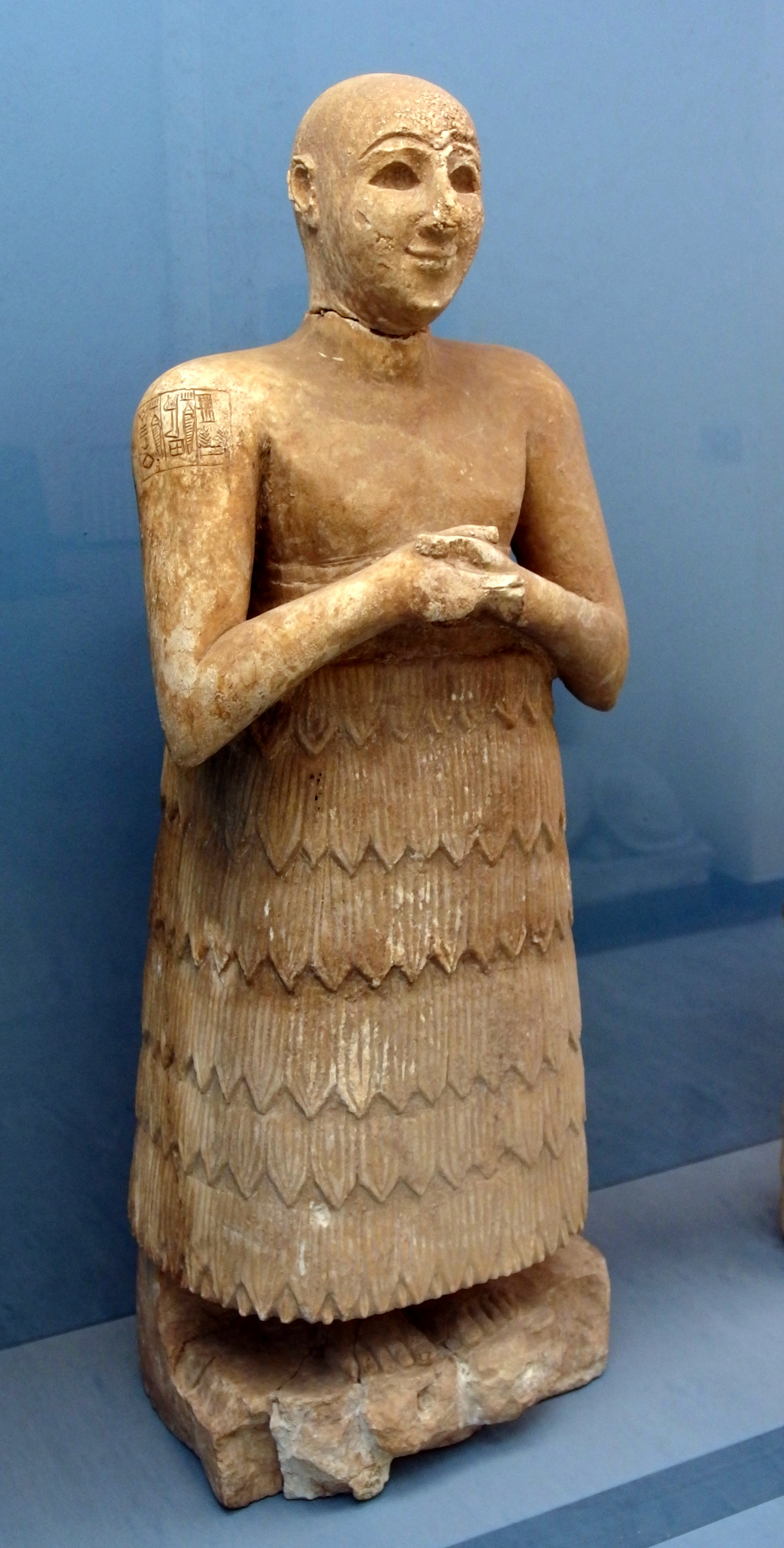
- Statue of Lugal-dalu, King or Governor of Adab in the 3rd millennium BC. He is not listed in the Sumerian King List. An inscription on the shoulder identifies him, and he is wearing the Kaunakes. Museum of the Ancient Orient, Istanbul.

King of Adab
- Reign: c. 2500 BC
- Dynasty: Dynasty of Adab
- Religion: Sumerian religion

Location of Adab

Lugal-dalu (Sumerian: 𒈗𒁕𒇻; fl. c. 2500 BC) was a Sumerian ruler of the Mesopotamian city of Adab in the mid-3rd millennium BC.

His name does not appear in the Sumerian King List, but he is known from a statue bearing his name. The statue is similar in style to those of other Sumerian kings such as Meannesi or Entemena, sons of En-anna-tum I.

The statue, made of grey gypsum or limestone, was discovered by Abbas Balkis of Affej during the excavations overseen by Edgar James Banks, who described it in an article published in 1904 as "The Oldest Statue in the World" (a claim shared by other statues such as the Urfa Man or the 'Ain Ghazal Statues).

The inscription in archaic cuneiform on the statue reads 𒂍𒊬 𒈗𒁕𒇻 𒈗𒌓𒉣𒆠 è-sar lugal-dalu lugal adab-(ki) "In the temple Esar, Lugaldalu king of Adab", referring to the Esarra Temple in Adab.

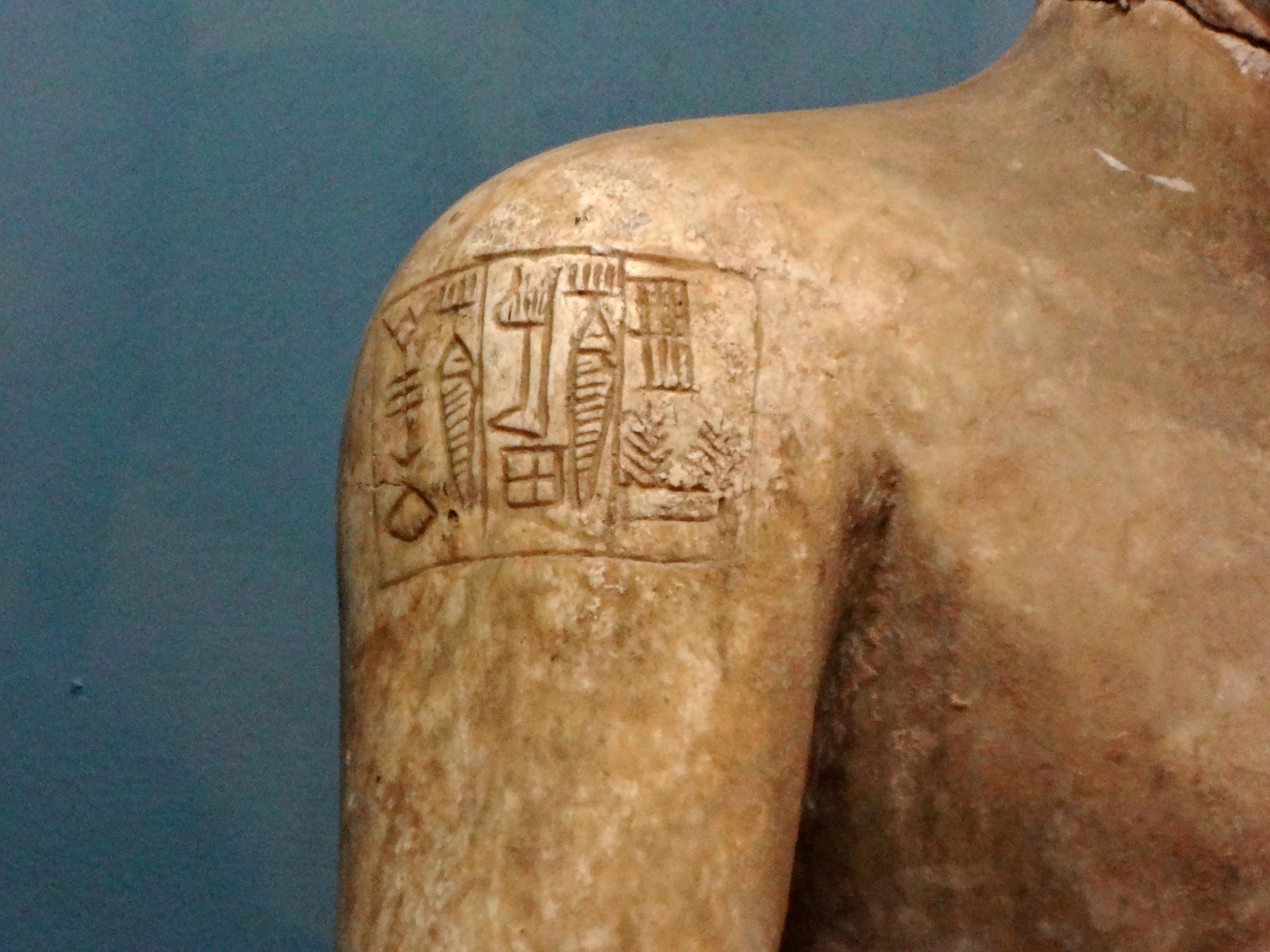
Detail of the inscription.

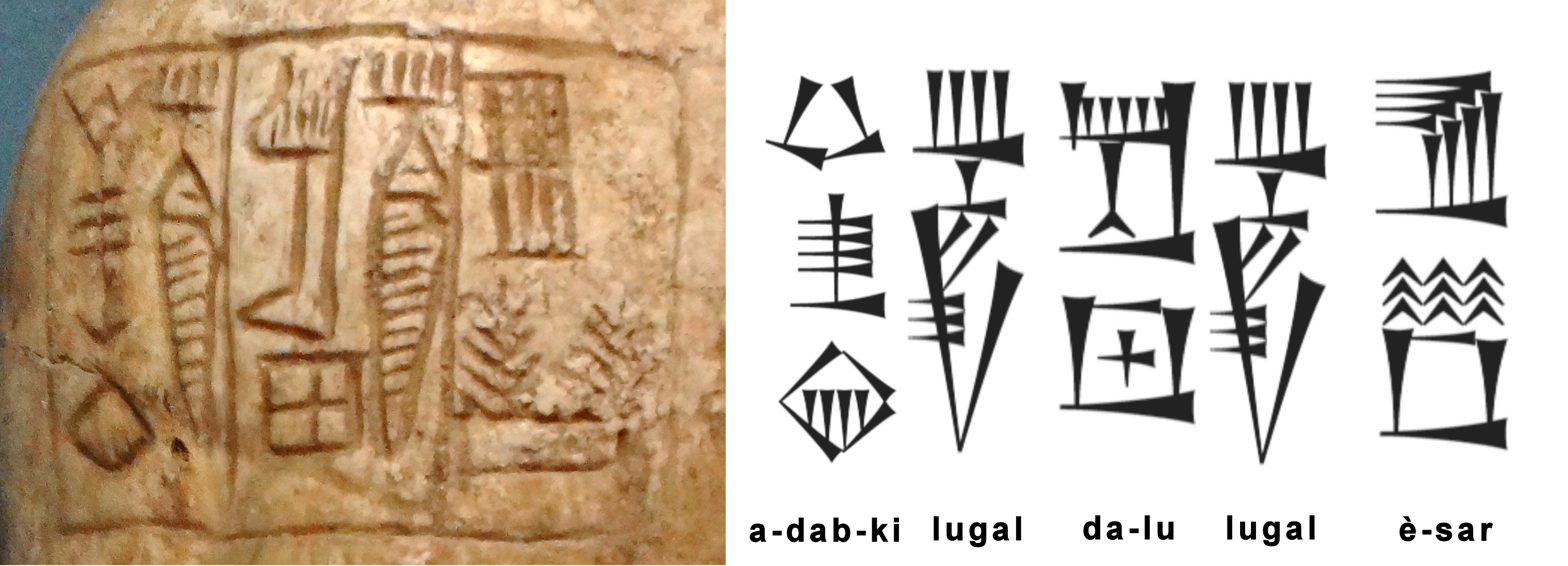
Lugaldalu inscription: 𒂍𒊬 𒈗𒁕𒇻 𒈗𒌓𒉣𒆠 è-sar lugal-dalu lugal adab-(ki) "In the temple Esar, Lugaldalu king of Adab"

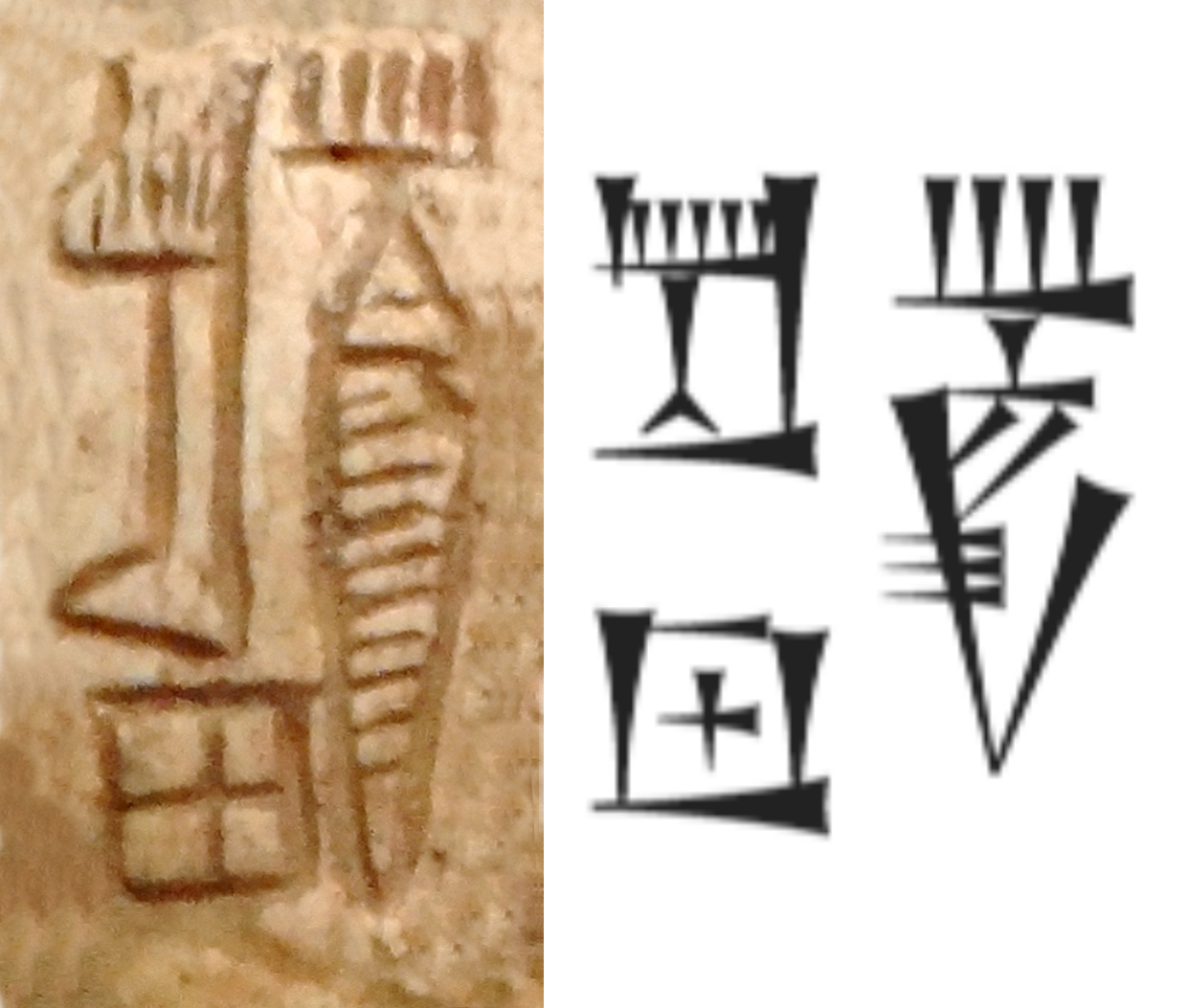
The name "Lugal-dalu" (𒈗𒁕𒇻) vertically in the inscription, with its rendering in standardized early Sumero-Akkadian cuneiform
