= Lugal-Anne-Mundu =

Sumerian king, c. 24th century BC

Lugal-Anne-Mundu 𒈗𒀭𒉌𒈬𒌦𒆕
- King of the Four Corners of the World
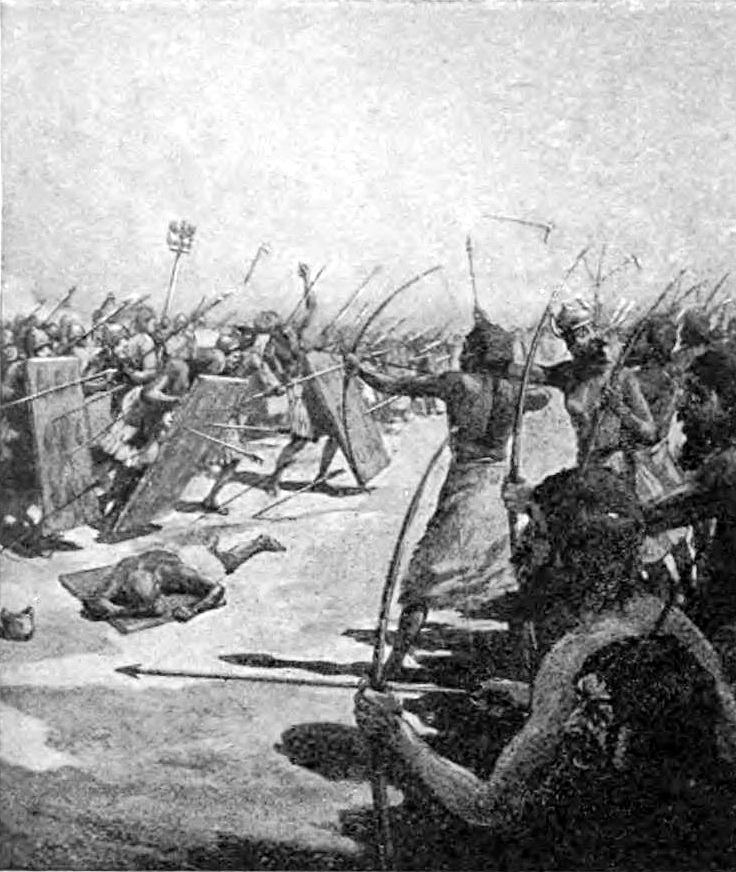
- Battle between the Sumerians (left) and the Semites, armed with bows and arrows. 20th century reconstitution.

King of Adab
- Reign: c. 2500 BC
- Dynasty: Dynasty of Adab
- Religion: Sumerian religion

Location of Adab

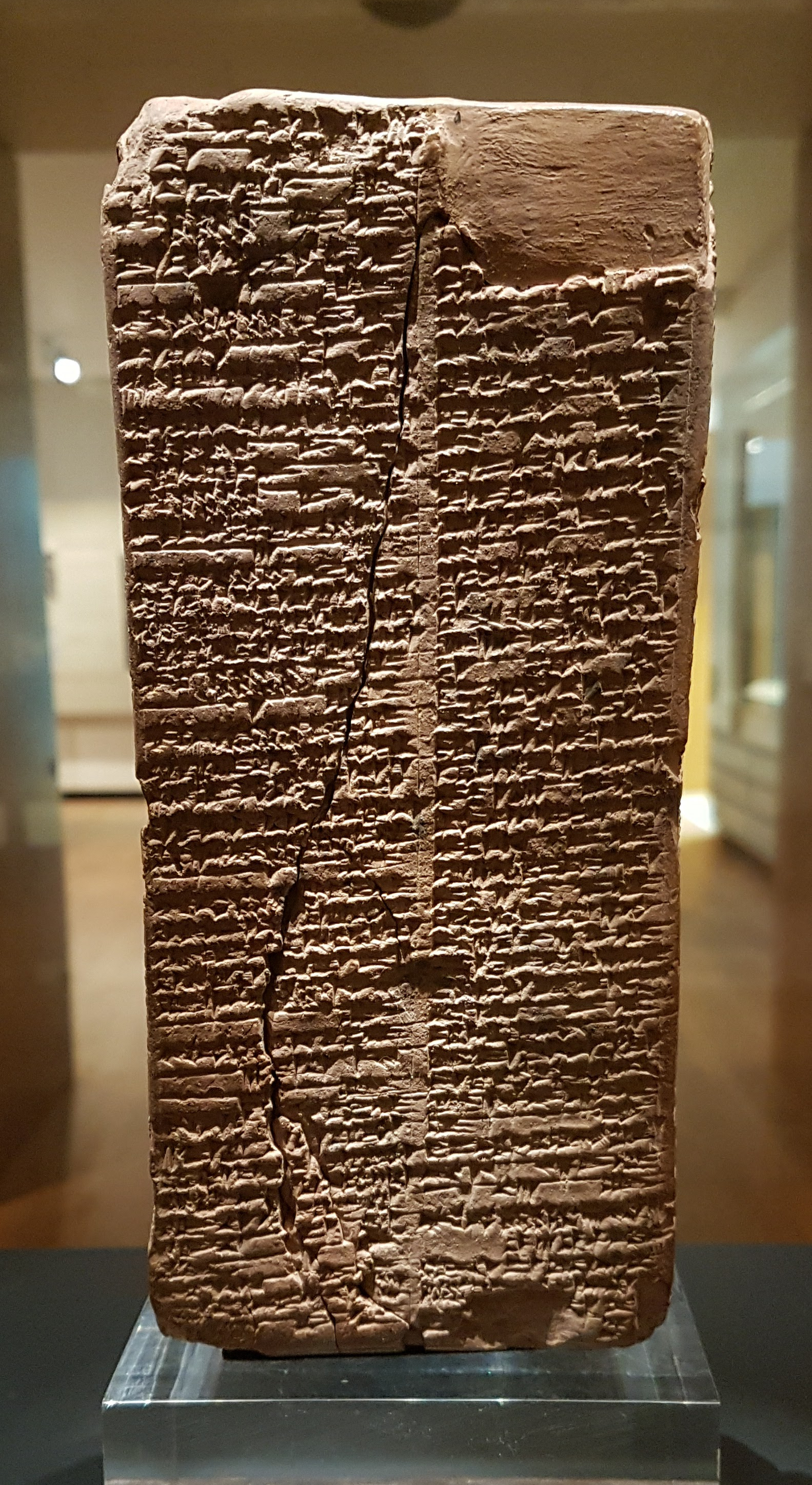
Lugal-Anne-Mundu appears in the Sumerian King List, as the first and only ruler of the Dynasty of Adab

Lugal-Anne-Mundu (Sumerian: 𒈗𒀭𒉌𒈬𒌦𒆕, lugal-an-ne₂-mu-un-du₃, fl. c. 2500 BC) was the most important king of the city-state of Adab in Sumer. The Sumerian king list claims he reigned for 90 years, following the defeat of Mesh-ki-ang-Nanna II, son of Nanni, of Ur. There are few authentic contemporary inscriptions for Lugal-Anne-Mundu's reign; he is known mainly from a much later text, purporting to be copied from one of his inscriptions.

His empire, perhaps the first in recorded history, collapsed upon his death. Following this, the king list indicates that the "kingship" (i.e. the Nippur-based hegemony) fell to a dynasty from Mari, beginning with Anbu; however, it has been suggested that more likely, only the last of these Mari kings, Sharrumiter, held the hegemony after Lugal-Anne-Mundu. With the break-up of the Adab kingdom, other prominent cities appear to have concurrently regained their independence, including Lagash (Lugalanda), Akshak (which not long afterward won the kingship from Mari, perhaps under Puzur-Nirah), and Umma (whose king Lugal-zage-si eventually went on to seize his own empire throughout the Fertile Crescent).

== Sumerian King List ==
Lugal-Anne-Mundu is mentioned in the Sumerian King List is some detail, although slightly fragmentarily. His rule is said to have followed that of Ur, but he was finally vanquished by the city-state of Mari:

"In Ur, Nanni was king, n years he ruled; Mes-kiag-Nanna, son of Nanni, n years he ruled; (...) Ur with weapons was struck down; the kingship to Adab was carried off. In Adab Lugal-ane-mundu was king, n years he ruled; one king, the years: 90(?) he ruled; Adab with weapons was stuck down; the kingship to Mari was carried off."

— Sumerian King List, 193-210.

== The "Lugal-Anne-Mundu Inscription" ==
According to the fragmentary inscription attributed to Lugal-Anne-Mundu, (but known only from two copies dated from the reigns of Abi-Eshuh and Ammi-Saduqa in the 17th century BCE), he subjugated the "Four Quarters of the world" — i.e., the entire Fertile Crescent region, from the Mediterranean to the Zagros Mountains:

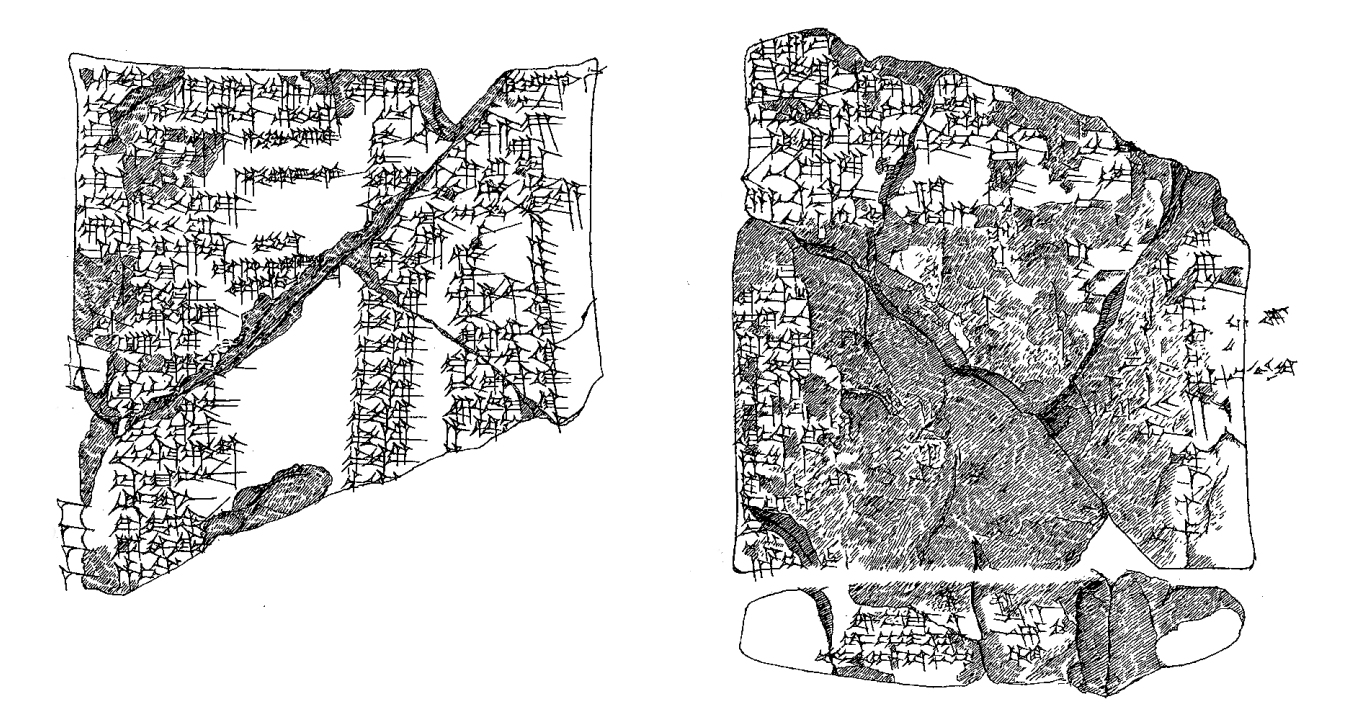
Lugal-Anne-Mundu inscription

"For Nintu, the mother of the nation, queen for the temple, great spouse of Enlil, his beloved lady— I, Lugalanamundu, the strong man, who provides for Nippur, king of Adab and king of the four world quarters (...) secured tribute upon the people of all the lands, made the people of all the lands lie (contentedly) in riverine meadows (...) exercised kingship over the whole earth (...) The Cedar Mountain, Elam, Marḫaši, Gutium, ... Subartu, Amurru, Sutium, and the Mountain(?) of Eanna in their ... they sat on golden thrones. Golden ... I placed in their hands, and golden ... I placed in their laps. Their ... in Adab into my ... I having made come, and ... I having made come before me..."

— Inscription of Lugal-Anne-Mundu (excerpts)

His empire is said to have included the provinces of Elam, Marhashi, Gutium, Subartu, the "Cedar Mountain land" (Lebanon), Amurru or Martu, "Sutium" (?), and the "Mountain of E-anna" (Uruk with its ziggurat?). According to the inscription, he "made the people of all the lands live in peace as in a meadow".

He also mentions having confronted a coalition of 13 rebel governors or chiefs, led by Migir-Enlil of Marhashi; all of their names are considered Semitic.

Arno Poebel published a preliminary translation of one of the fragments in 1909, although he was unable to make out the king's name, which he rendered as "Lugal[.....]ni-mungin". Hans Gustav Güterbock published a more complete translation in 1934, but quickly dismissed the account as pseudepigraphic and largely fictional. Modern scholars believe the text should be considered a literary fiction invented in the Old Babylonian period. It is unlikely the text originated from an Early Dynastic Period inscription. The alleged events likely don't contain more than a kernel of historical authenticity.

== See also ==
- History of Sumer

== Notes ==
Regnal titles
Preceded by unknown king in Ur	King of Sumer (per Sumerian King List)	Succeeded by Anbu of Mari
Preceded by	Lugal of Adab c. 2500 BC	Succeeded by
