= E-iginimpa'e =

Sumerian ruler circa 2400 BCE

E-iginimpa'e 𒂍𒅆𒉏𒉺𒌓𒁺
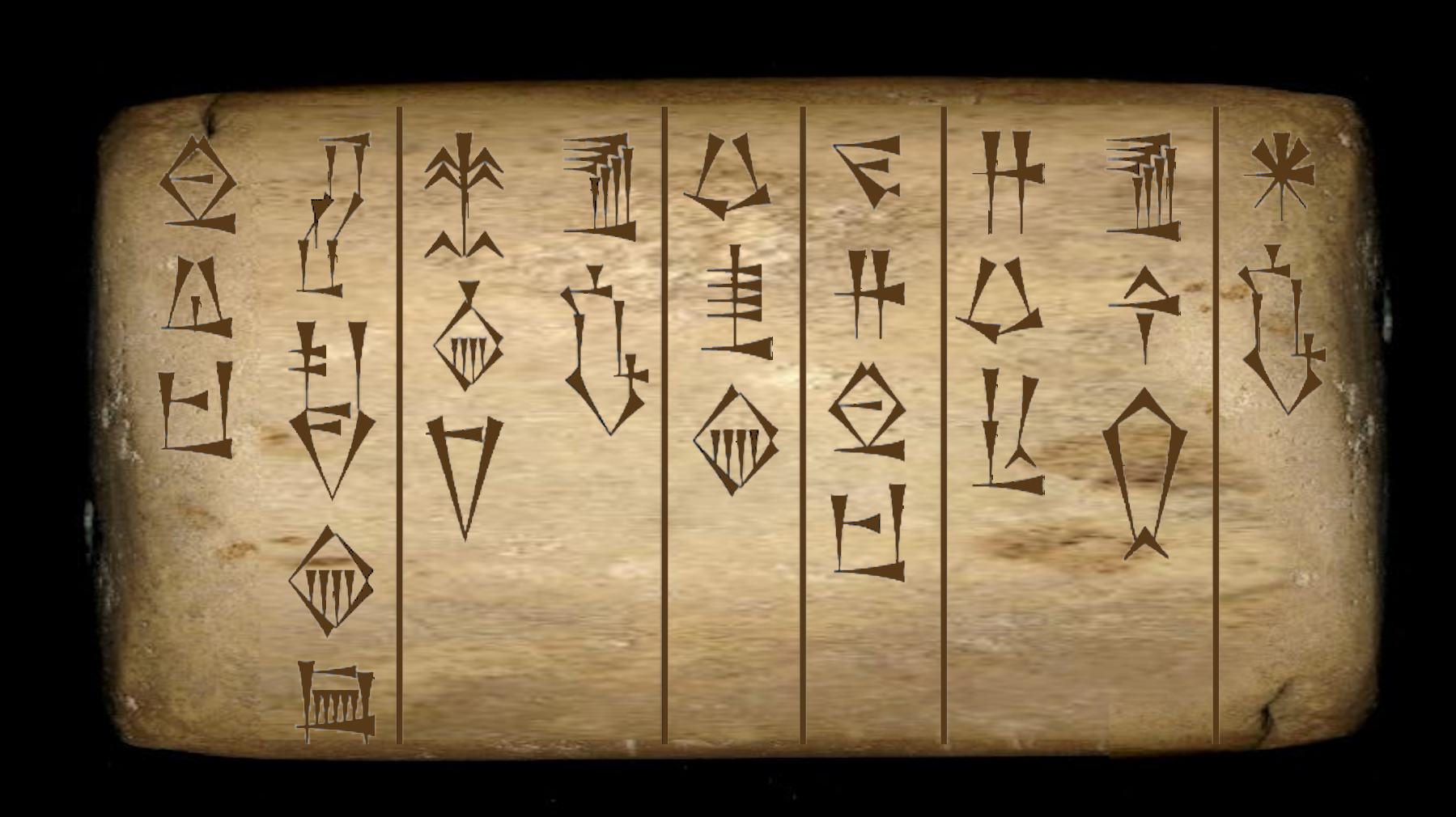
- Votive tablet of E-iginimpa'e, Hermitage Museum (reconstitution)

King of Adab
- Reign: c. 2400 BC
- Predecessor: Possibly Paraganedu
- Successor: Possibly Mug-si
- Dynasty: Dynasty of Adab
- Religion: Sumerian religion

Location of Adab

E-iginimpa'e (Sumerian: 𒂍𒅆𒉏𒉺𒌓𒁺, e2-igi-nim-pa-e3; fl. c. 2400 BC) was a Sumerian ruler (ensi) of the Mesopotamian city of Adab. He may have succeeded another ensi known as Mug-si.

He is known from several inscriptions, most of them located in the Oriental Institute Museum, Chicago, with one tablet in the State Hermitage Museum, Saint Petersburg. He was a contemporary of Lugal-zage-si as several land transactions are recorded between the two.

One of his tablets reads, dedicated to goddess Digirmah or Ensimah (𒀭𒈤, equivalent of Martu) reads:

𒀭𒈤 𒂍𒅆𒉏𒉺𒌓𒁺 𒃻𒑐𒋼𒋛 𒌓𒉣𒆠 𒂍𒈤 𒈬𒈾𒆕 𒌫𒁉𒆠𒂠 𒋼𒁀𒋛

^{d}-mah/ e2-igi-nim-pa-e3/ GAR-ensi/ adab{ki}/ e2-mah mu-na-du/ ur2-be2 ki-sze3/ temen ba-si

"For the goddess Digirmah, E-iginimpa'e, ensi-GAR of Adab, built the E-Mah for her, and buried foundation deposits below its base"

— Tablet of E-iginimpa'e in the State Hermitage Museum, Saint Petersburg.

E-iginimpa'e was "ensi-GAR", the highest civil office in Adab.
