= Museum of the Ancient Orient =

- Eski Şark Eserleri Müzesi
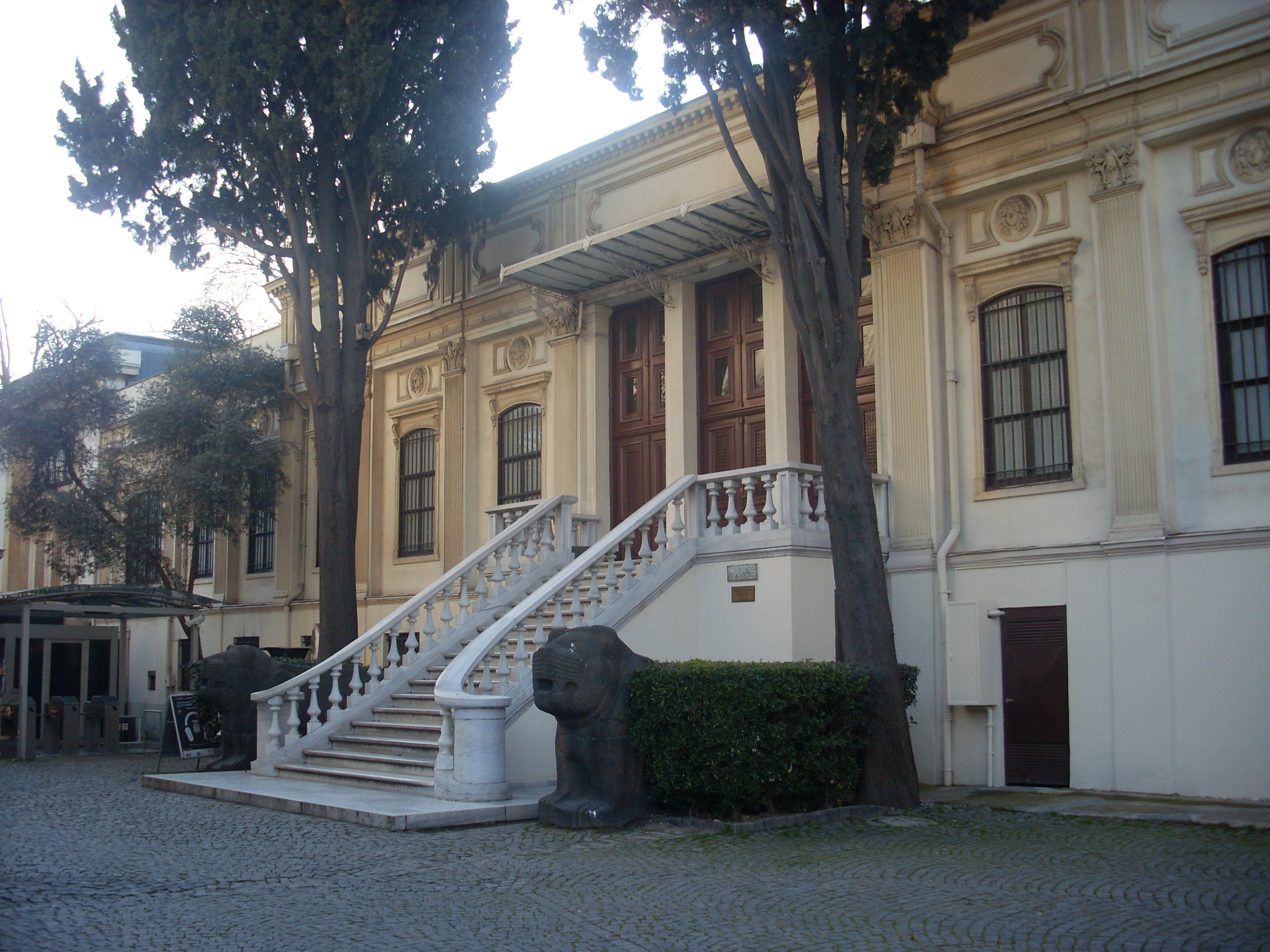
- Established: 1935
- Location: Osman Hamdi Bey Yokuşu Sokak, Gülhane, Istanbul, Turkey
- Coordinates: 41.0113434°N 28.9803093°E
- Type: Archaeology museum
- Visitors: 530.065 (2022)
- Director: Rahmi Asal
- Website: Official website

The Museum of the Ancient Orient (Turkish: Eski Şark Eserleri Müzesi) is a museum in Istanbul, Turkey, and part of the Istanbul Archaeology Museums complex, located opposite the main Archaeology Museum building. The museum is housed in the former building of the Ottoman College of Fine Arts (Sanâyi-i Nefîse Mektebi), commissioned by Osman Hamdi Bey and designed by Alexandre Vallaury in 1883. The museum itself was established in 1935 in its current building, following the moving of the College in 1916.

Collections in the museum consist of artifacts from the pre-Hellenistic era of Anatolia and Mesopotamia, and the pre-Islamic era of Egypt and the Arabian Peninsula. In addition, there are departments on Urartian and Aramean artifacts, as well as cuneiform tablets. Most of these artifacts were unearthed during archaeological excavations that began in the late 19th century during the Ottoman Empire and continued until World War I, and were subsequently brought to Istanbul.

== History ==
Following its evacuation in 1916, the former College of Fine Arts building was assigned to the Directorate of Museums. The museum's director at the time, Halil Edhem Eldem, thought it would be more appropriate to exhibit artifacts belonging to the ancient cultures of the Near East separately from Hellenistic, Roman, and Byzantine artifacts, and ensured that the building was organized as the Museum of the Ancient Orient. The German assyriologist Eckhard Unger, who was invited to the museum for this project, worked in Istanbul between 1917-1919 and 1932-1935, completed the museum's exhibition in 1935, and published a series of works on the artifacts.

The museum, which was evacuated for defensive purposes during World War II, was later reorganized by Osman Sümer according to Unger's principles. A major renovation was carried out in 1963, and it reopened to the public in 1974. The museum underwent its most recent maintenance and repairs in 1999-2000, and acquired its present appearance on September 8, 2000.

== Collections ==
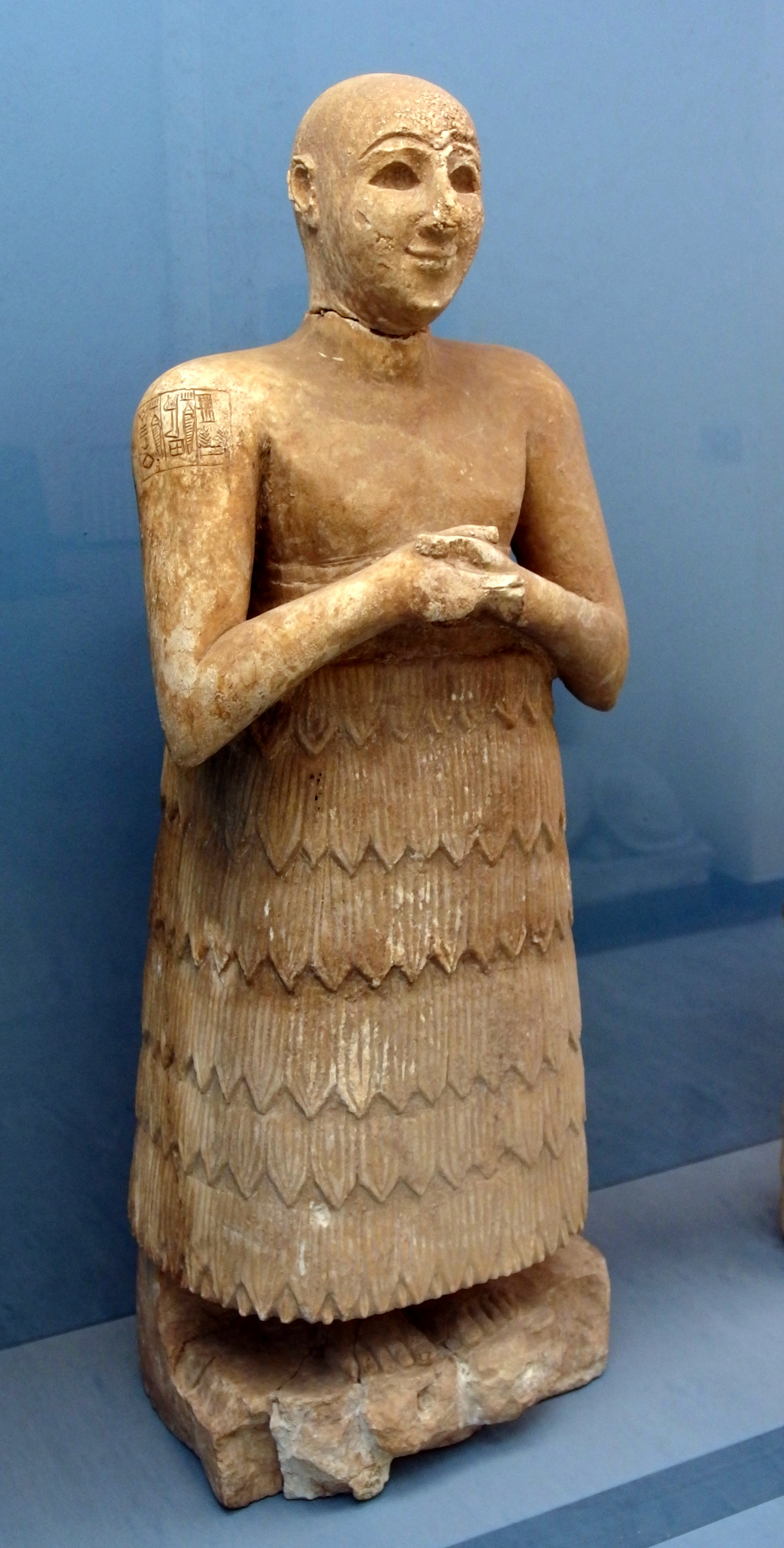
Statue of Lugal-dalu

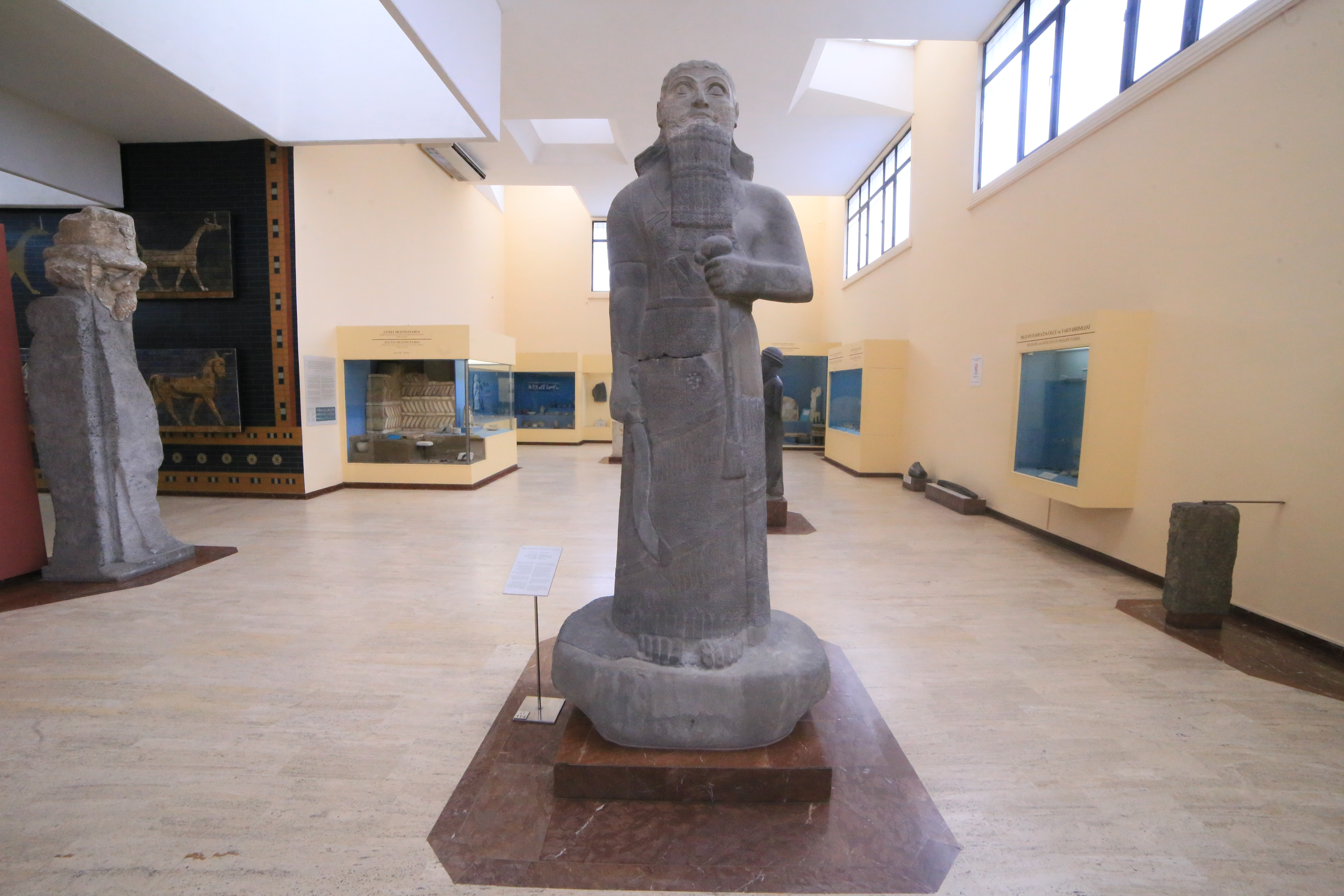
Statue of Salman-esser III

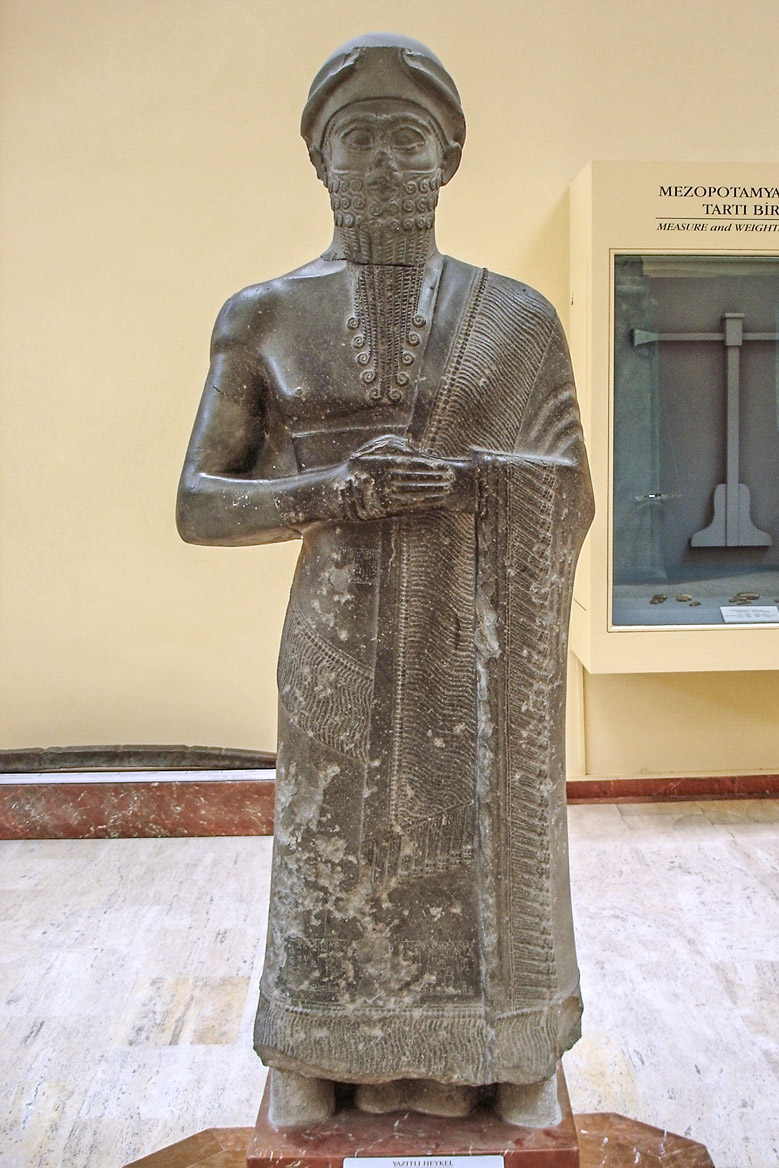
Statue of Puzur-Ishtar

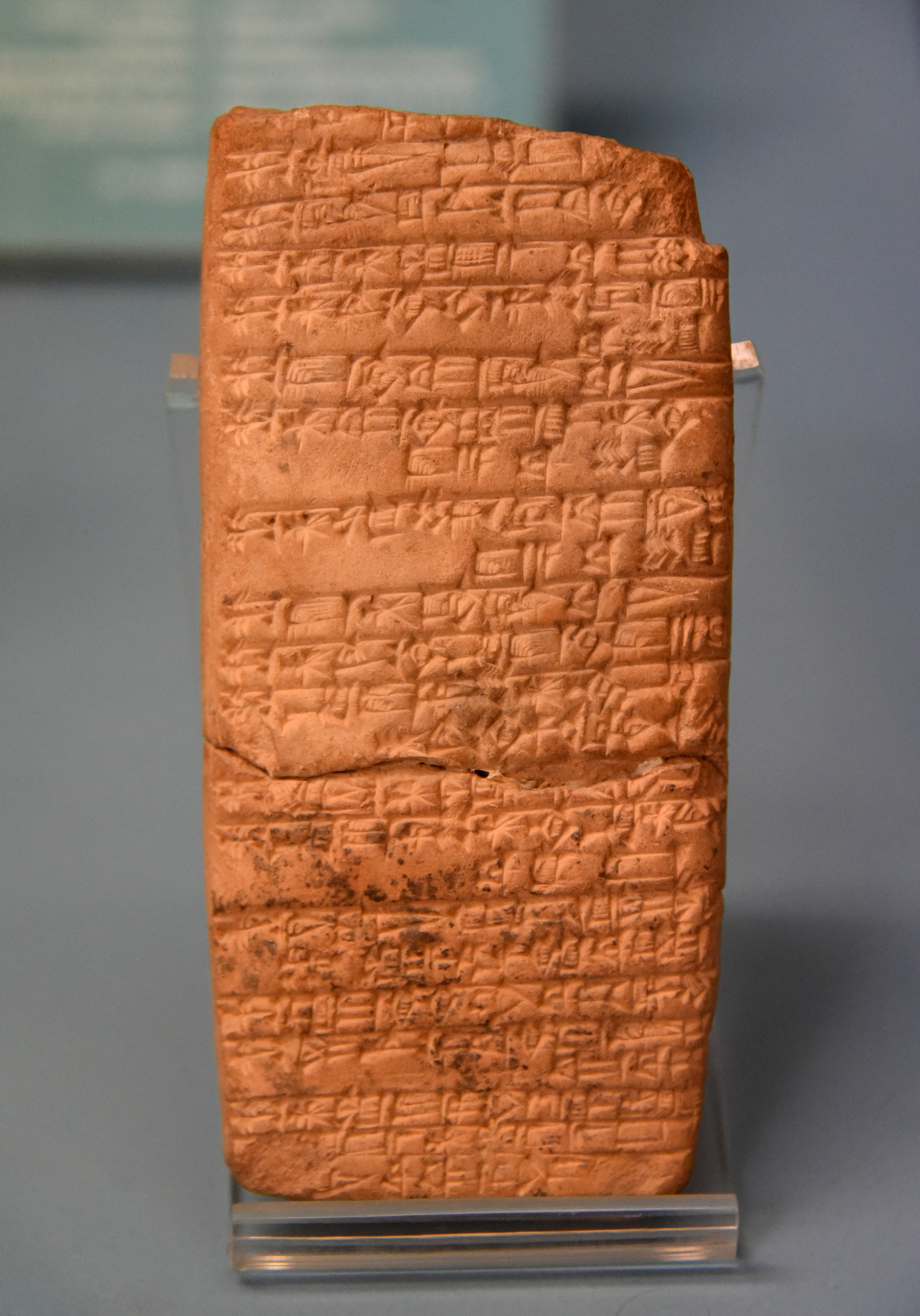
Year names of Shulgi.

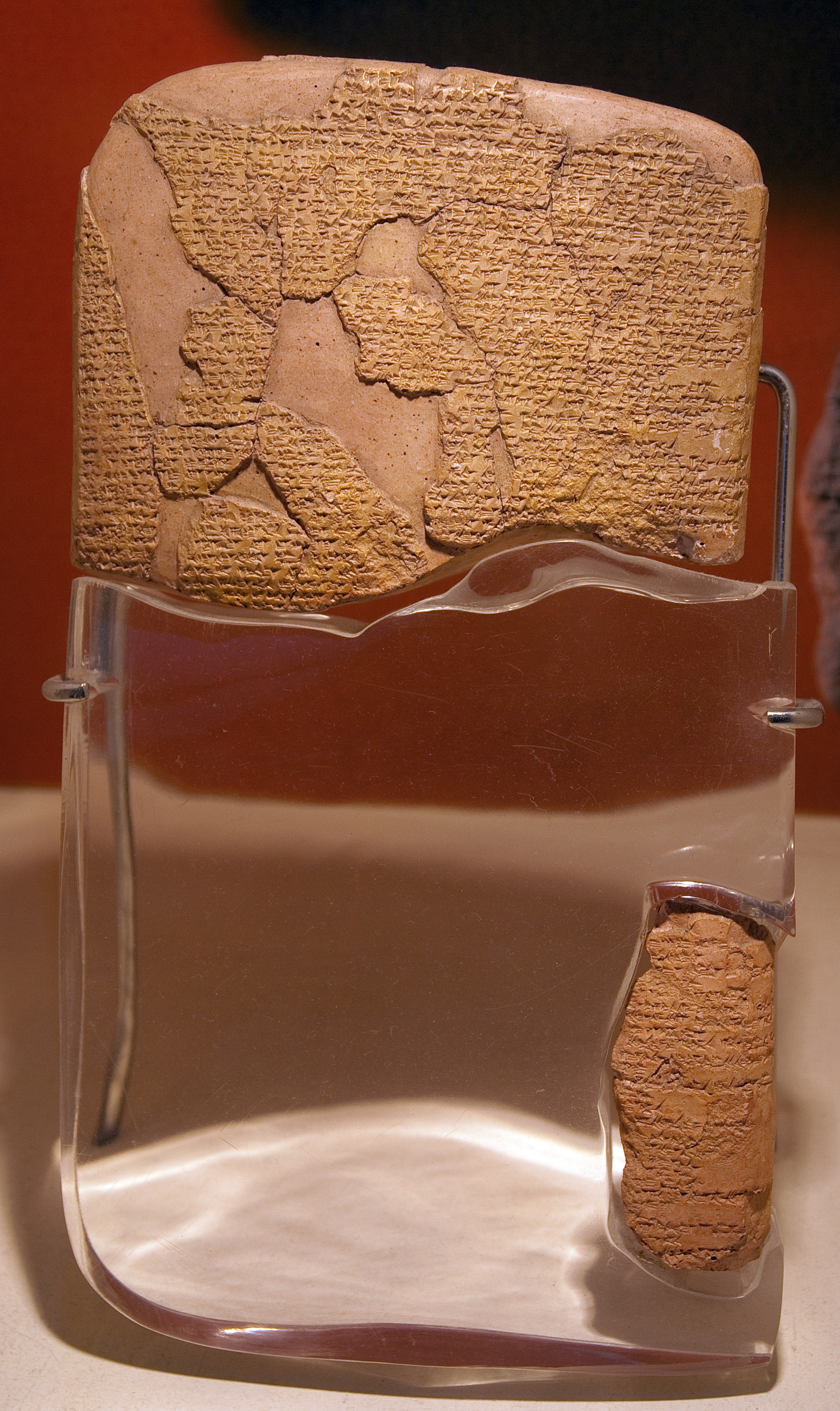
Treaty of Kadesh, discovered at Hattusa

Naram-Sin stele, Akkadian period

Ancient Egyptian painted wooden funerary stele

== Halls and exhibits ==
Entrance to the Hittite hall

2nd Hittite hall

Entrance to the 2nd Hittite hall

Sumerian inscriptions

Sumerian exhibit

Gudea sculpture, Neo-Sumerian

Ancient Egyptian exhibit

Ancient Egyptian mummies

Babylonian hall

Assyrian hall

Arabian peninsula artifacts

Arabian peninsula exhibit

== See also ==
- Istanbul Archaeology Museums
- Museum of Islamic Art, housed in the Tiled Kiosk
- Great Palace Mosaic Museum
- Turkish and Islamic Arts Museum
- List of museums and monuments in Istanbul
