= Proto-cuneiform =

Early proto-writing system

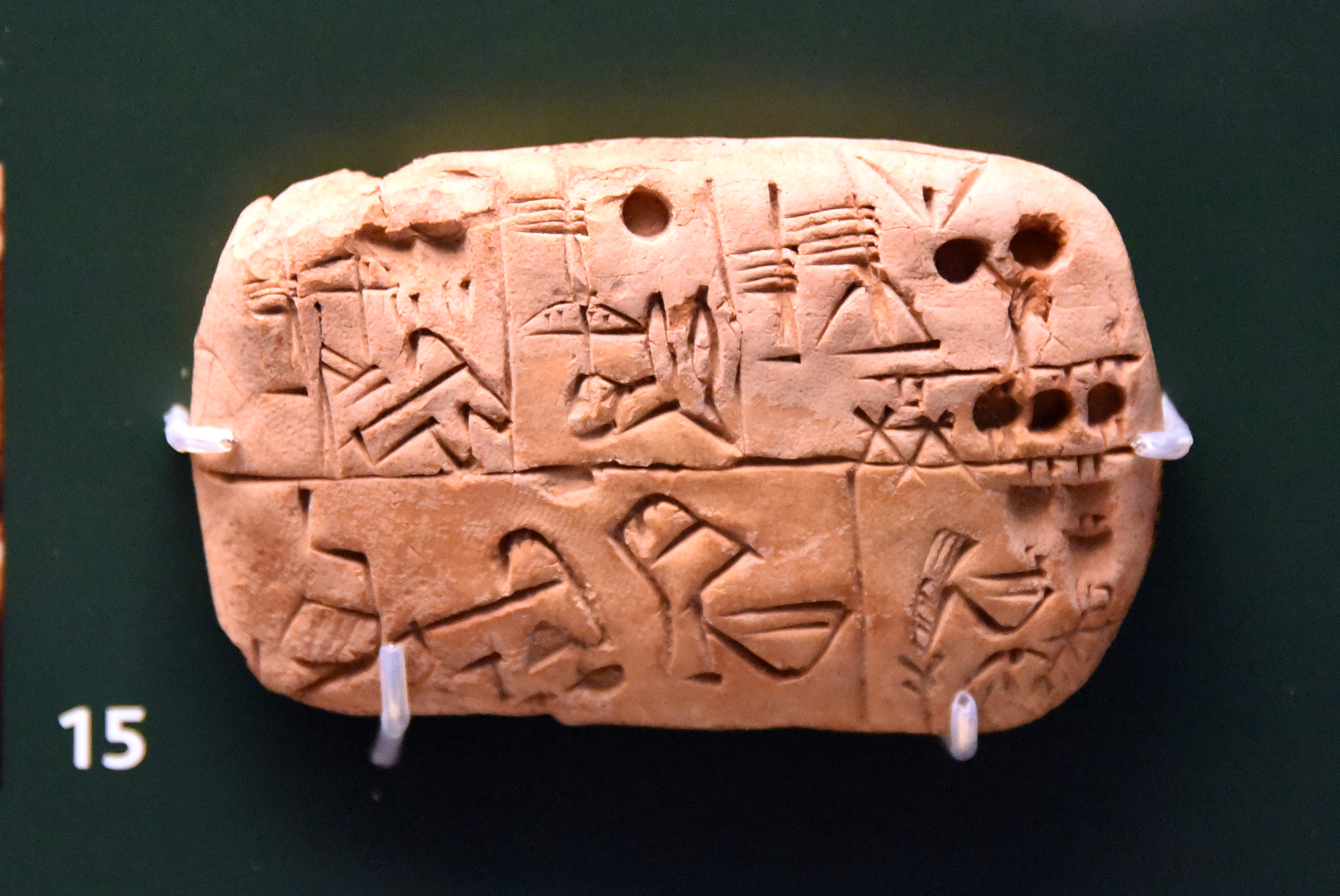
- Proto-cuneiform clay tablet, Uruk III phase, c. 3200–3000 BC. Food issue list, "rations" written by combining a human head and a bowl (the triangular object is the regular symbol for bread). British Museum.
- Script type: Ideographic
- Period: c. 3350–3000 BC
- Direction: Diverse
- Languages: Unknown, possibly Sumerian

Related scripts
- Child systems: Cuneiform

ISO 15924
- ISO 15924: Pcun (015), Proto-Cuneiform

Unicode
- Unicode alias: Proto Cuneiform
- Unicode range: U+12550–U+1268F Archaic Cuneiform Numerals

The proto-cuneiform script was a system of proto-writing that emerged in Mesopotamia c. 3350–3200 BC (during the Uruk period), eventually developing into the early cuneiform script used in the region's Early Dynastic I period.

It arose from the token-based system that had already been in use across the region in preceding millennia. Other precursors of this system include clay bullae containing tokens, and numerical tablets using only numeral signs. Those devices were used in the institutions of Mesopotamia and western Iran during the 4th millennium BC, in order to record administrative operations. The proto-cuneiform subsequently appeared in southern Mesopotamia, during the 34th century BC. This system is documented by around 5,000 clay tablets coming from various sites, dating from c. 3350–3000BC.

This invention is related to the increasingly complex administrative practices, itself a consequence of the formation of more complex social and political entities, considered to be the first cities and states. Those evolutions are especially visible at Uruk, the site where most of the proto-cuneiform texts were found.

Proto-cuneiform is a writing or proto-writing system, based on a set of numerical signs, related to various metrological systems, used according to what was quantified (discrete objects, surfaces, volumes, duration), and logographic signs (a sign = a word) which for many have a pictographic origin (drawings of the thing designated). The texts are essentially administrative in nature. They record movements of goods entering or leaving the stores of the institutions, quantifying them and indicating the people and offices involved in these operations. Other tablets are inventories of signs organized thematically, ancestors of the lexical lists typical of the Mesopotamian literary traditions.

While it is known definitively that later cuneiform was used to write the Sumerian language, it is still uncertain what the underlying language of proto-cuneiform texts was, given that they are not intended to transcribe a language and contain almost no clues about the language spoken by those who wrote them.

== History and context ==
=== Precursors of writing ===
Research on the origins of writing in the ancient Near East has identified a set of non-linguistic administrative instruments that it considers to be "precursors" of writing, during so-called "pre-writing" periods c. 8500-3500 BC, testifying to a broader context of development of information technologies.

The oldest by far, possibly as early as the middle to late 9th millennium BC, is a token-based accounting system came into use in various parts of the ancient Near East. However, it is unlikely that all the tokens excavated in prehistoric sites were used in accounting practices, since many of them were excavated outside of administrative contexts, especially children's graves. But at least some of them seem to be accounting devices, in use as soon as Neolithic periods (for instance at Tell Sabi Abyad). For tokens from the Uruk period (4th millennium BC), the accounting use and the link with the first written tablets seem obvious. Tokens remain in use during later periods of Near Eastern history, up to the first half of the 1st millennium BC.

The token system was later completed by clay envelopes or bullae, "spherical, hollow, clay balls that contain a certain number of the aforementioned tokens, which were also impressed on the sealed outside surface of the balls." Many of them also have seal impressions and numerical marks on their surfaces. The oldest date back to the middle of the 4th millennium BC (Uruk phases VI/V), in contexts directly preceding the appearance of writing. Their use is again generally interpreted as accounting, since they must serve to accompany the transfer of goods: by breaking the bubble in order to examine its contents, it is verified that no goods were lost during the transfer. They also remained in use for several millennia.

The earliest clay tablets found date from the Uruk V period, c. 3500-3350 BC, and are of a 'numerical' character, that is to say that they are inscribed with numbers, but do not contain yet any of the logographic signs that are found in the proto-cuneiform system. They were excavated in several sites such as Uruk, Habuba Kabira, Jebel Aruda, Mari, Nineveh, Khafajah, Chogha Mish, Susa, etc. Numerical tablets differ from bullae in that they do not contain tokens, but are flattened pieces of clay on which tokens are printed or numerical signs are inscribed, often accompanied by seal impressions. These same signs are found on clay bullae, making the link between the two difficult to dispute, and it is accepted that the numerical signs derive from the tokens impressed on the bullae-envelopes, at least some numerical signs having been made by impressing tokens in clay. The signs made with styluses are circles or notches of varying thickness and elongation, which indicates that they refer to different number systems, obviously the ancestors of those of the proto-cuneiform system. But they are poorly understood, each site seeming to have its own variants. A few cylinder seals from the Uruk V period have been found. At Uruk and in western Iran (Susa, Godin Tepe, Tepe Sialk), a few tablets were found containing numerical signs accompanied by one or two ideographic (logographic) signs. They were labelled by Englund "numero-ideographic" tablets. The pictograms represent discrete objects, therefore products (and not people or institutions): sheep, jars, fruits, textile products. This would be an evolution of numerical tablets, and the missing link between them and the first written tablets.

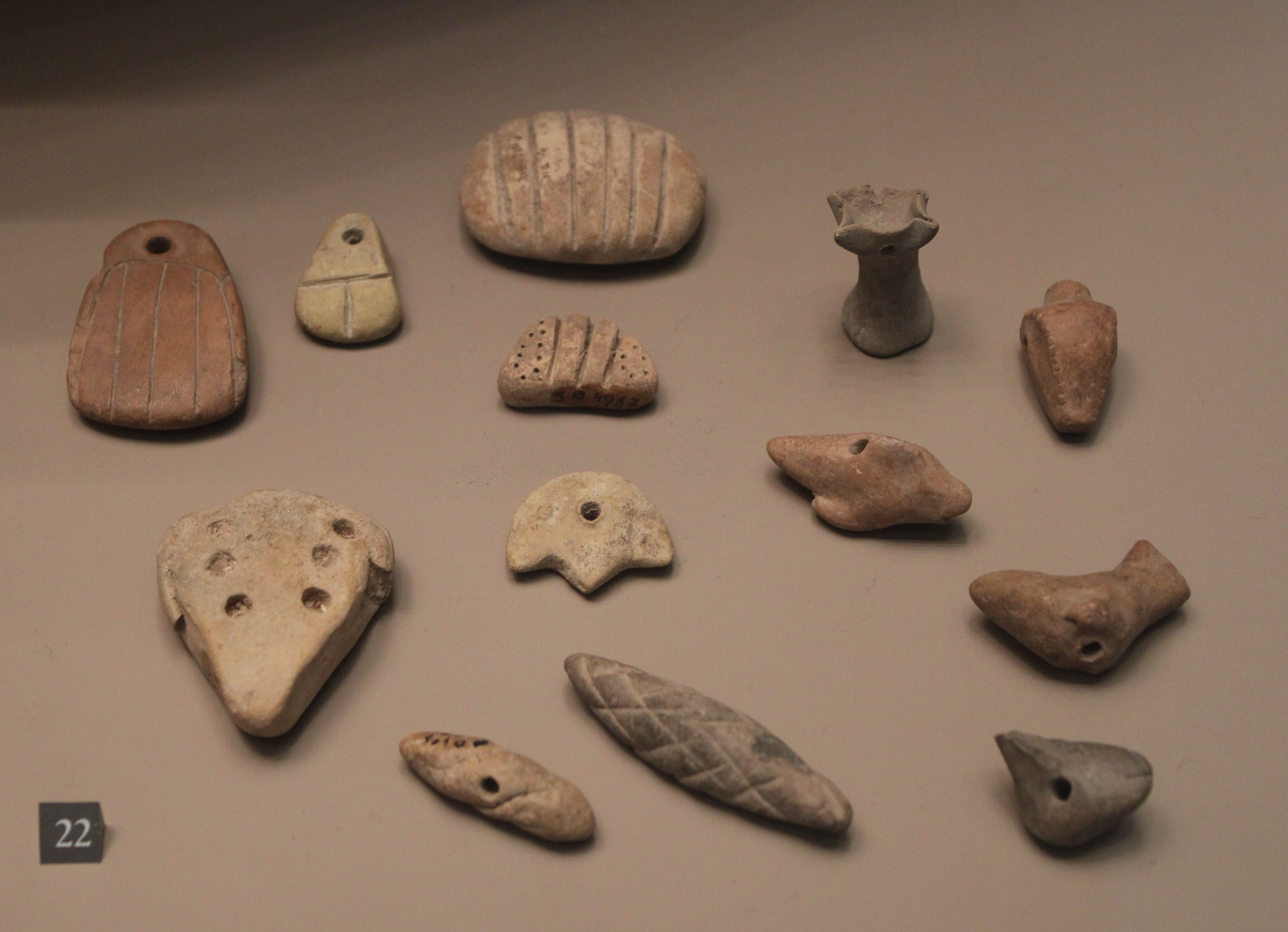
Accounting tokens of various shapes: jar, ram's head, bread and unidentified objects. Susa, c. 3800-3100 BC. Louvre Museum.

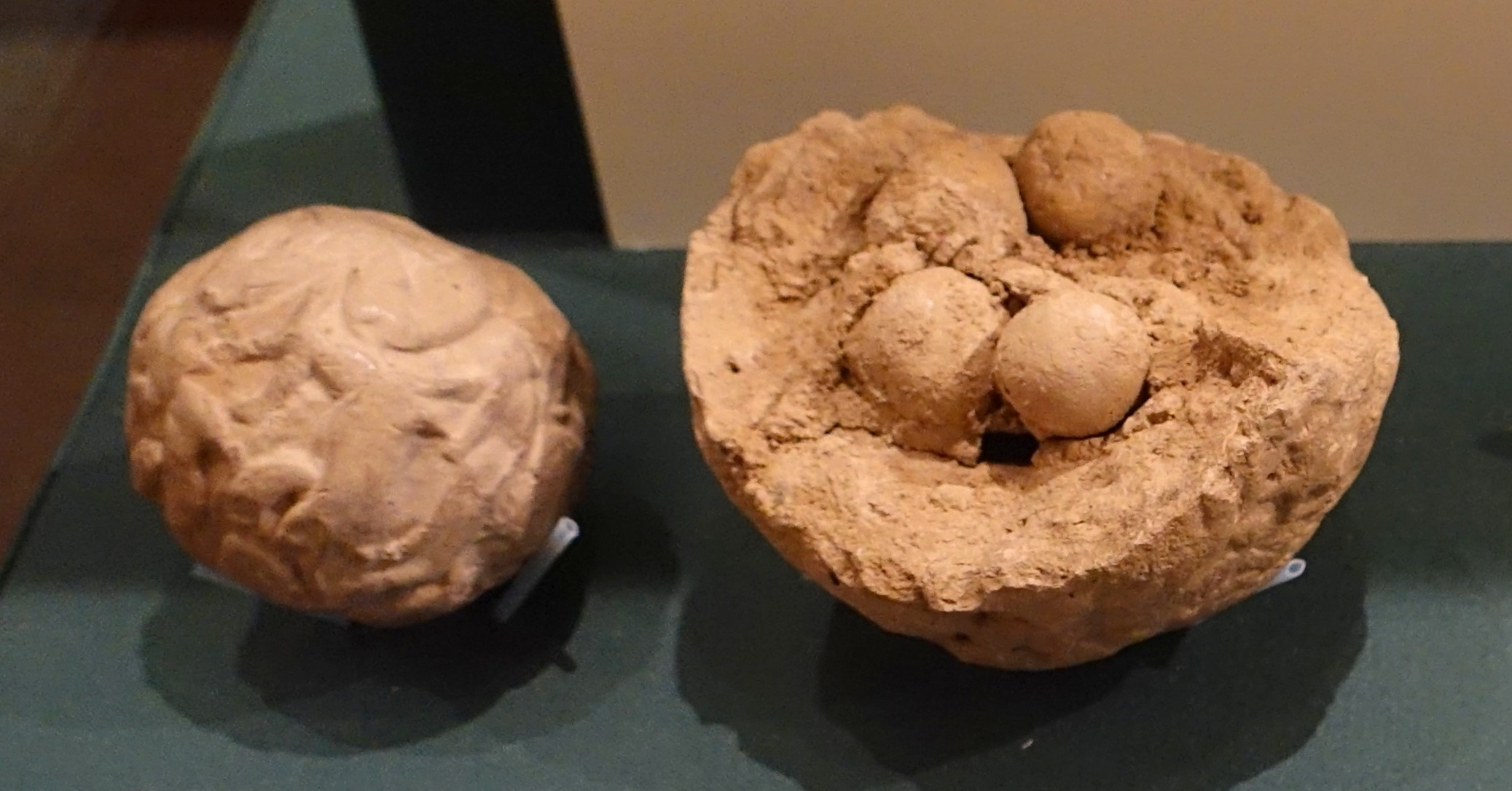
Two clay bullae, one complete with a seal impression on its surface, the other broken with the tokens visible. Oriental Institute Museum, Chicago.

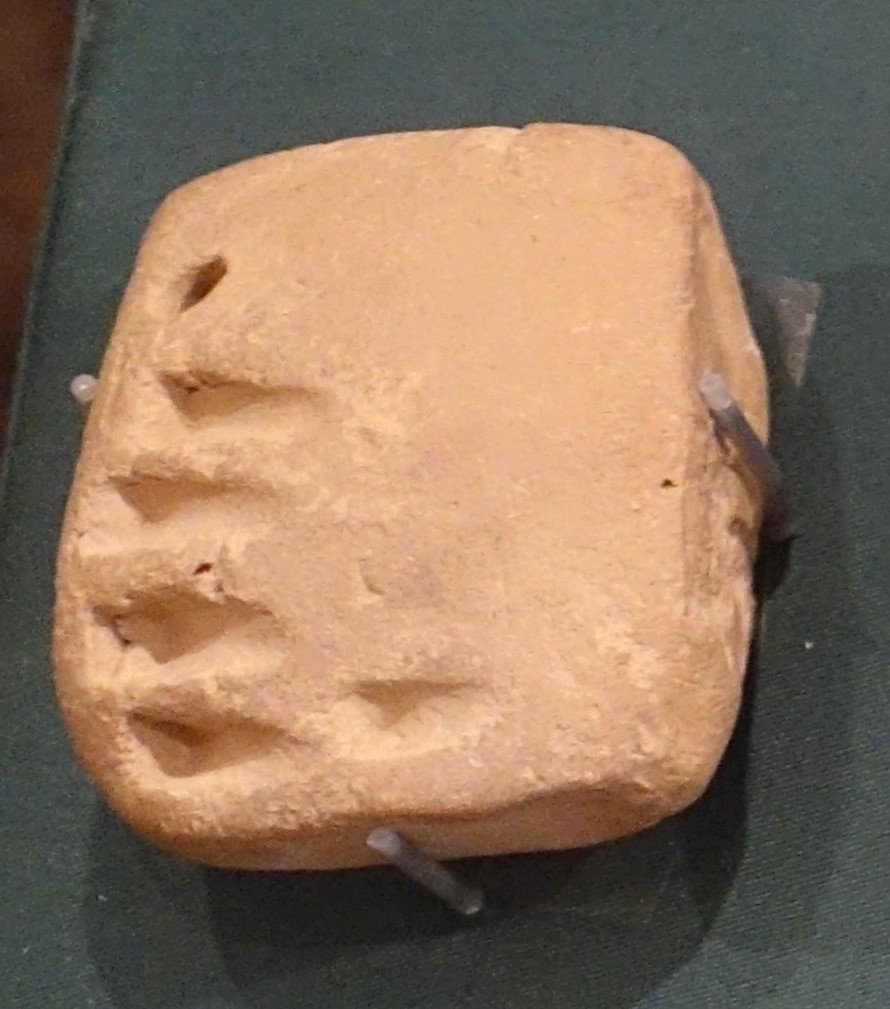
Numerical tablet from Khafajah. Oriental Institute Museum, Chicago.

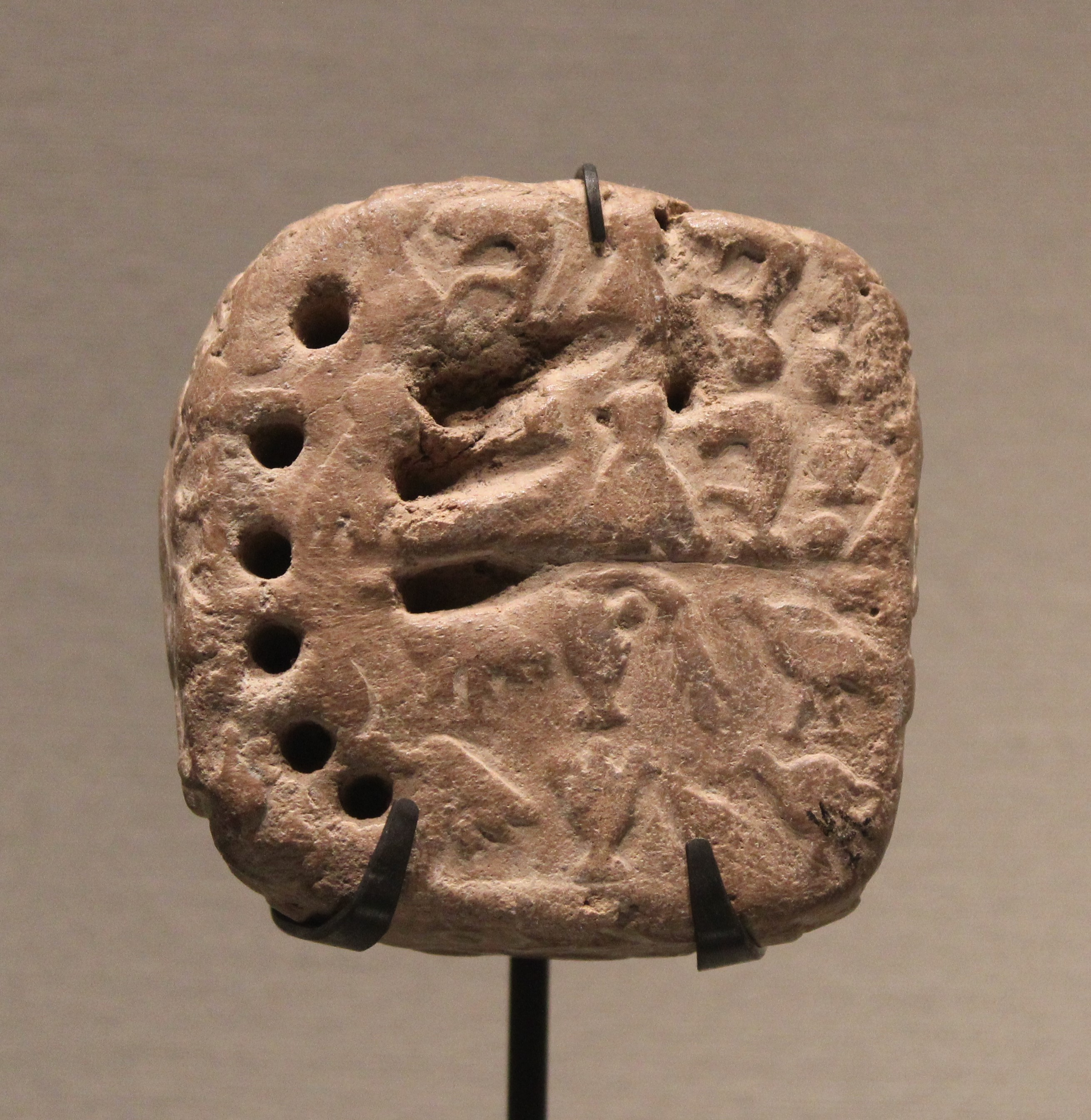
Numerical tablet with two types of numerical signs and the impression of two cylinder seals. Susa, c. 3800-3100 BC. Louvre Museum.

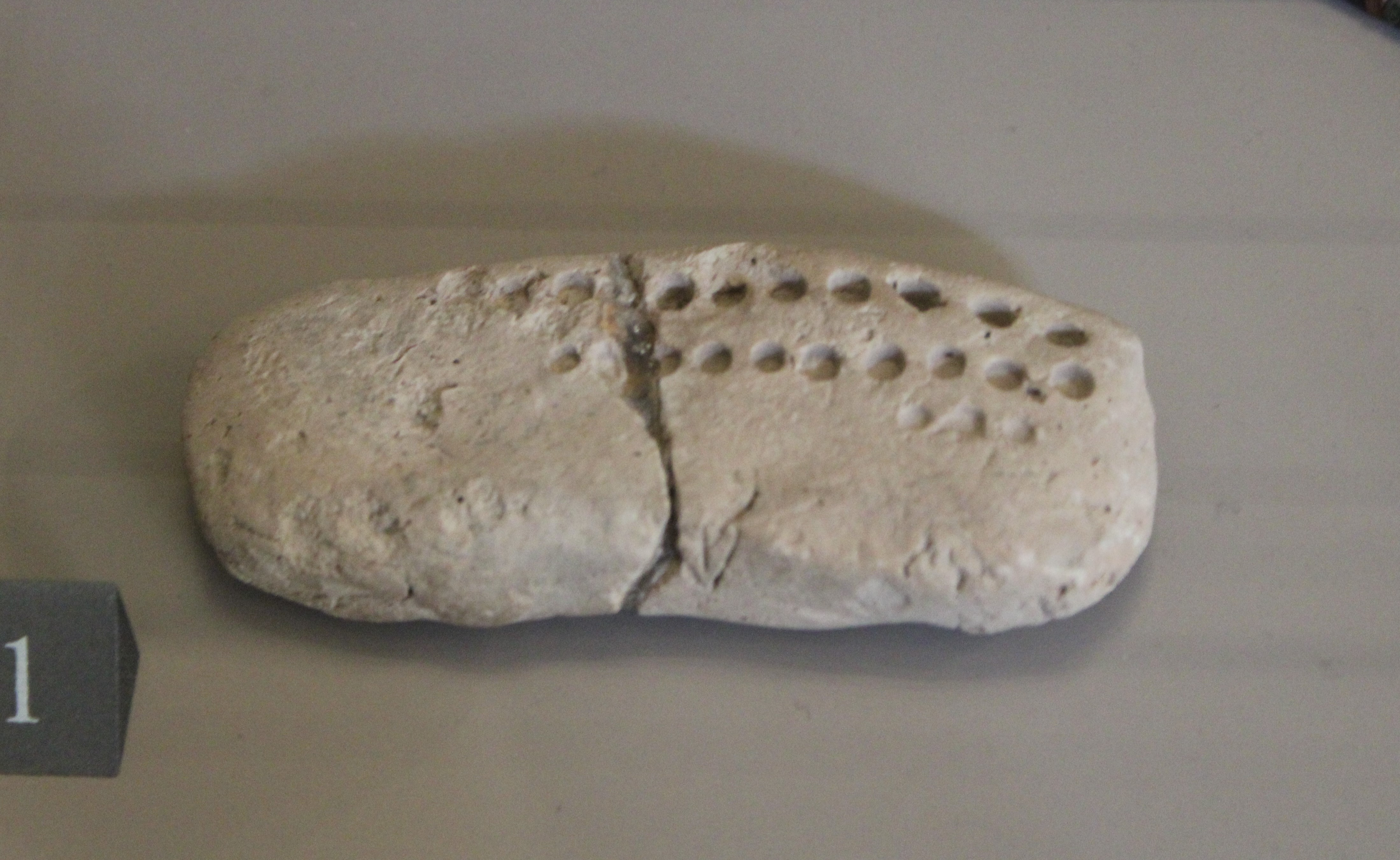
Numero-ideographic tablet from Tepe Sialk (the dots are numerical signs; the ideographic sign is on the other side), c. 3500-3350 BC. Louvre Museum.

Studies based mainly on the evidence from Susa and Uruk, especially those of Denise Schmandt-Besserat (drawing on earlier works by M. Lambert and P. Amiet), have linked all these accounting devices, establishing a filiation from accounting tokens to proto-cuneiform tablets. Although they have been debated and criticized, it became clear that tokens, bullae and numerical tablets represent the precursors of writing in Mesopotamia, and therefore that cuneiform began with numerical signs. According to this widely accepted historical reconstruction, bullae are first used for counting using tokens, then people start printing tokens and signs on them, and then the tokens disappear, the bulla is flattened to become a tablet containing numerical signs. These numerical tablets themselves constitute an intermediate stage between the accounting systems preceding writing and the first proto-cuneiform tablets. This evolutionary chain is probably to be completed by integrating the few "numero-ideographic" tablets which seem to directly precede the appearance of proto-cuneiform.

It has also been suggested that the development of proto-cuneiform signs was influenced by symbols (motifs) found on earlier cylinder seals. Stamp seals were not considered. Cylinder seals imagery and proto-cuneifom signs both participate in the same desire to record information, and to imagine a way of representing things, including the abstract and the intangible.

=== Chronology of proto-cuneiform ===
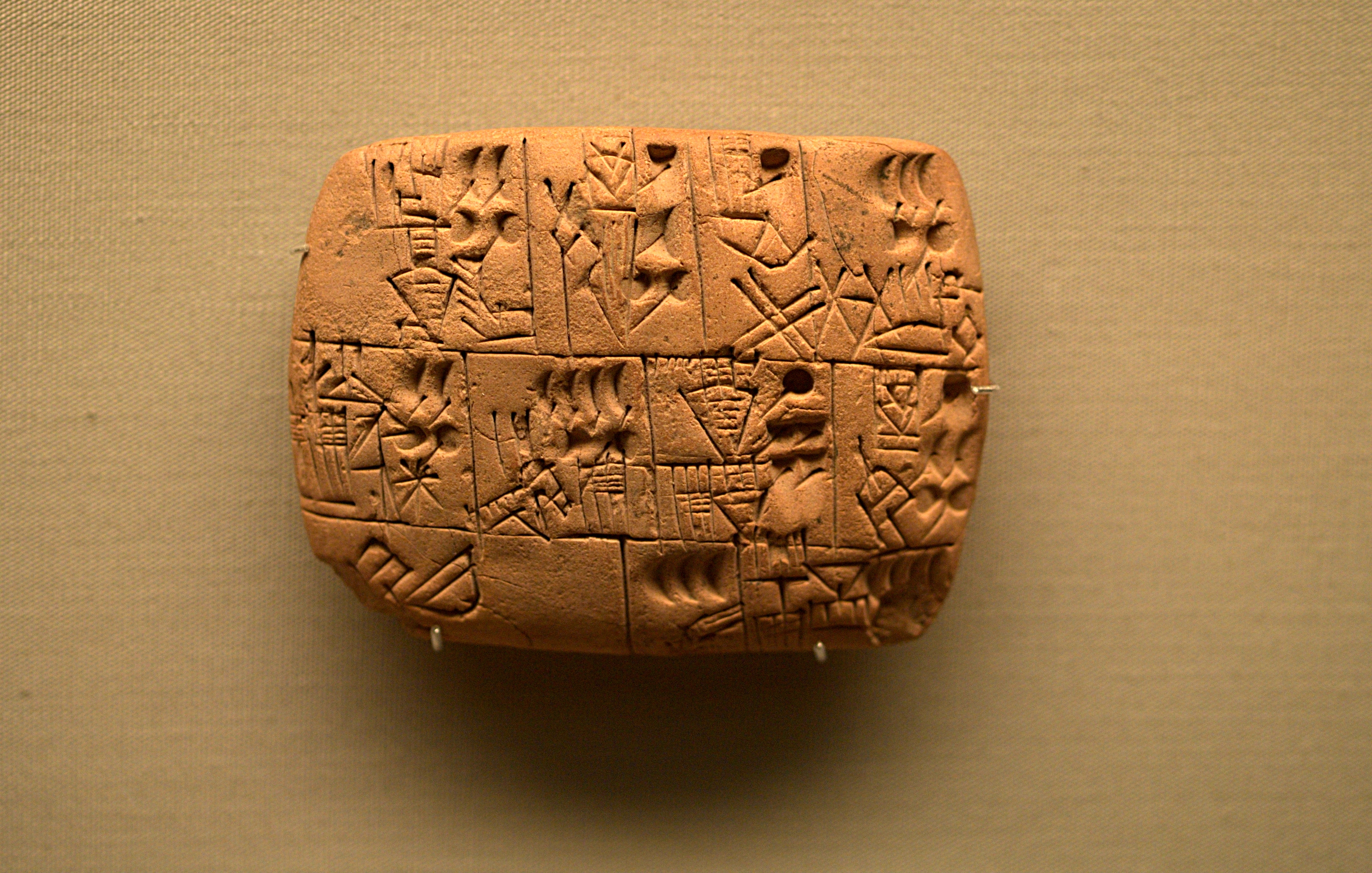
Proto-cuneiform tablet recording the allocation of beer

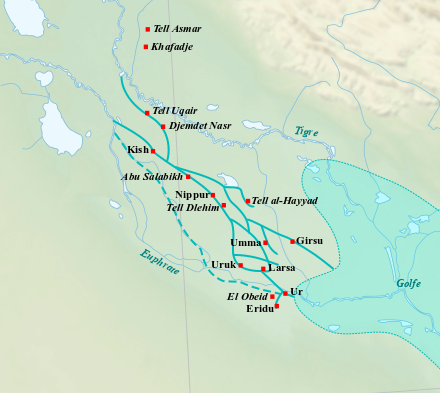
Location of the main sites in southern Mesopotamia in the Uruk and Jemdet Nasr periods

Although, by convention, the date of 3200 BC used to be commonly accepted as the date of the invention of proto-cuneiform, recent analyses in the dating of the Uruk levels suggest that it should be dated further back in time. Dating proposals also depend on the definition given to writing. Englund (in 2015) proposes a date around 3350 BC for the appearance of non-numerical signs marking the birth of proto-cuneiform, Nissen (in 2016) around 3300 BC, Glassner (in 2020) an invention of writing during the 34th century BC.

The various proto-cuneiform tablets are divided into two main categories, following the classification made in 1936 by A. Falkenstein based on paleographic criteria. They are named according to the general archaeological phases of the Eanna of Uruk to which they correspond. Two phases of proto-cuneiform writing are thus commonly accepted:

- Uruk IV: these are the first evidence of proto-cuneiform writing, dated to the Late Uruk period. The tablets are small, the signs consist of continuous lines, either straight or curved, and are more naturalistic. There is no indication that an earlier stage of this writing existed: the Uruk IV tablets are directly preceded chronologically by the "precursors" seen above, and in all likelihood represent the earliest stage of writing. The Cuneiform Digital Library Initiative dates approximately this period from 3350 to 3200 BC.
- Uruk III: These tablets present a more complex profile, testifying to the development of writing and even to a series of reforms: the number of signs in the repertoire increases considerably, the strokes are shorter, the shapes are less rounded and more linear, the style of the signs is more abstract, the format of the tablets becomes more sophisticated, and writing conventions appear. These tablets are contemporary with the archaeological period known as Jemdet Nasr. The Cuneiform Digital Library Initiative is using the 3200–3000 BC range for this phase.

With the advent of the Early Dynastic Period (ED), from c. 3000–2900 BC onwards, the standard cuneiform script used to write the Sumerian language emerged, though only about 400 tablets have been recovered from the first part of this period (c. 2900–2700 BC, ED I); these are mainly from Ur, with a few from Uruk. According to Englund, this would be a "late proto-cuneiform" stage.

=== Historical context ===
The invention of proto-cuneiform occurs during the Late Uruk period, c. 3500–3200 BC. This period is rich in changes, often grouped under the expression "urban revolution" or "state formation". It is a phase characterized by the emergence of more complex political structures than in the past ("states"), and of bigger settlements ("cities"), with an urban or "proto-urban" character. It is also a period of technological innovations and economic developments: the development of irrigated agriculture, the plow, wheeled carts, wool crafts, ceramics with the introduction of the potter's wheel, new architectural processes, etc. According to G. Selz:

The Uruk phenomenon has received much attention as an early example of an emergent state. To what extent this state is seen as a fully centralized organization controlling bureaucratic, legal, military, and religious institutions is largely a matter of interpretation. The emergence of statehood in southern Mesopotamia was clearly intertwined with the process of urbanization and the development of Uruk as a center that functioned as the administrative and political hub from which other settlements depended hierarchically. This coincides with progressive specialization and division of labor, as best evidenced by the proto-cuneiform records of the Late Uruk period.

The invention of proto-cuneiform, seen as the invention of writing, is commonly considered to mark the transition from prehistory to history. This can be tempered by the observation that it is one innovation among others that occurred during the era of the "urban revolution", but nonetheless one of the most significant. According to Mario Liverani:

The origin of writing has also been considered to mark the beginning of true and proper history, because of the old-fashioned idea that there is no history before the availability of written sources. But now that such an idea is considered simplistic or wrong, we still can consider writing the most evident and symbolic culmination of the entire process.

Proto-cuneiform obviously reflects this context rich in creativity, and the fact that it is primarily documented in Uruk, the main settlement of the period (often labelled "the first city"), is no coincidence. Chronologically, the proto-cuneiform tablets appear near the end of this phenomenon. The oldest are dated in part to the Uruk IV phase, c. 3350–3200 BC, thus the last part of the Late Uruk period. The most recent, and the majority of them, date from the Uruk III phase, corresponding to the archaeological period known as Jemdet Nasr, c. 3200–3000 BC. This phase saw a decline in Uruk influence, after significant changes affecting the architecture of the Eanna district of Uruk, site abandonment, and various developments in material culture. All this indicates a period of change, if not structural crisis.

Proto-cuneiform tablets also provide information on the society of their time: they are of little use for the knowing the political organization of the period, but the lists of professions and offices allow to identify a social hierarchy and the presence of figures supervising the economy of the time; they attest to the presence of a developing economic administration, with managers, the first scribes, and specialized offices; administrative documents also provide information on religious worship, notably through the presence of the sign of Inanna, the tutelary goddess of Uruk, in the tablets of this city.

=== Linguistic context ===
There is a longstanding debate in the academic community regarding when the Sumerian people arrived in Mesopotamia. Partly spurred by linguistic arguments and evidence, overall it is generally clear that a number of fundamental changes occurred in Mesopotamia—such as the use of the plano-convex brick—at the same time the first definitive evidence of the Sumerian language appeared during the Early Dynastic I period (c. 2700 BC). Proto-cuneiform offers no clear clues as to what spoken language it encoded, leading to much speculation, though Sumerian is often assumed.

=== Causes and functions ===
Since it was proven that proto-cuneiform originates in bookkeeping and administrative precursors such as tokens, bullae and numerical tablets, it became obvious that its origins are to be looked for in the accounting and administrative practices of the Uruk period. This system is born from numeracy, developed from systems that were established before its invention and which improved their capacity to record information until gradually leading to the establishment of a new, more efficient system. The objective is therefore to constitute an administrative tool able to meet the needs of the institutions that developed during the Uruk period and managed a social and economic organization that was much more complex than in the past. It is ultimately a response to problems brought about by the fact that society has become more "complex".

Reflecting this context and purpose, the majority of proto-cuneiform texts are administrative in nature, recording goods movements and indicating the identity of people or administrative offices, while lexical lists provide inventories of these same goods to the administrators who wrote the administrative records. Moreover, the formal structure and semantics of this writing clearly derive from its origin and administrative uses. It is possible that its invention, the culmination of previous managing innovations, was not perceived at the time as a revolution. However, its potential to record more information than others was quickly understood, as evidenced by the fact that increasingly complex administrative documents were developed from the earliest times.

This invention is also, in many ways, political. The development of bookkeeping instruments and accounting techniques such as proto-cuneiform in Mesopotamia was accompanied by that of instruments for dividing up time, weights and measures, prices, and therefore various practices of standardization and even planning, formalizing economic relationships, and establishing a "technology of social control" enabling Urukean institutions to better coordinate the use of their resources. In seeking to analyze the intentions of the actors of the time, according to G. Algaze, we can see in the way in which the Urukean administrators treated the servile workers they employed (considered in the accounting documents in much the same way as the livestock of the institutions) a desire for the "domestication of human labor", and more generally the attempt of the elites of the time to consolidate their hold on society and its resources:

In short, by the end of the Uruk period, cumulative innovations in the ways knowledge was gathered, processed, and transmitted through time and space provided southern Mesopotamian decision makers and the urban institutions they worked for with a flow of varied and reliable economic data of the sort that is necessary for the formation, maintenance, and effective expansion of large-scale economies and social groups. More important, these data allowed Uruk elites to deploy available labor and goods where they were needed most in order to maximize their revenues, extend their power, and shore up the stability of the social system they were in the process of transforming.

At any rate, the invention of writing is not generally seen as the culmination of an attempt to represent human language graphically, by means of pictograms representing words. This old interpretation is now obsolete because the characteristics of proto-cuneiform do not support it.

Alternative views have been proposed, in particular by J.-J. Glassner, who criticizes both the hypothesis of the pictographic origin and also that of the accounting origin of writing, and considers that the latter is not totally independent of the spoken language from the earliest times. Without gaining support from specialists of proto-cuneiform, this type of critique of the dominant approach helps to highlight the fact that proto-cuneiform cannot be reduced to its accounting aspect. It quickly developed other functions and implications, visible especially in lexical lists, and was a major cognitive evolution.

=== Beyond Mesopotamia ===
==== Pre-proto-Elamite ====
In Iran, during the Uruk V period (c. 3500 BC), many tablets exist that have the same symbols as other examples of Proto-cuneiform. These tablets were manufactured prior to the existence of the Proto-Elamite script and period and would have been a product of influence from the Uruk culture.

==== Proto-cuneiform and Proto-elamite ====
During the late 4th millennium BC (c. 3100–2900 BC according to the range adopted by the Cuneiform Digital Library Initiative), another type of early writing developed in southwestern Iran: Proto-Elamite. This is also the name given to the culture that developed during this period, so named because it seems to be an antecedent of the civilization of Elam which occupied these same regions later (Proto-Elamite civilization). This system is primarily documented by tablets unearthed at Susa (phase III), which are also the most complex, but others have been found on sites in Iran (Tell-e Malyan, Tepe Yahya, Tepe Sialk, Tepe Sofalin, Shahr-e Sokhta, etc.). It is a completely administrative system (two tablets could be of a metrological or mathematical nature), mainly concerning agricultural activities and products, including numerical signs, pictographic signs representing objects, and abstract signs, the value of the signs being often enigmatic. Susa provided crucial documentation for understanding the precursors of writing (complex tokens, bullae, numerical tablets and numero-ideographic tablets), but no example of a proto-cuneiform tablet. This site would therefore have followed a similar evolution to Uruk, but without the decisive step. The general opinion is that the proto-elamite system was inspired by proto-cuneiform, which would therefore be at least slightly older. But this remains controversial, because beyond the numerical signs and a few ideograms, the two systems are very different. It is therefore possible that the two are "sister scripts" that each appeared separately, constituting two different evolutions from the numerical and numero-ideographic tablets. However it may be, proto-elamite was only used for a short period, and disappeared without apparent posterity, even though it is a possible precursor to Linear Elamite.

== Corpus ==
Proto-cuneiform find spots

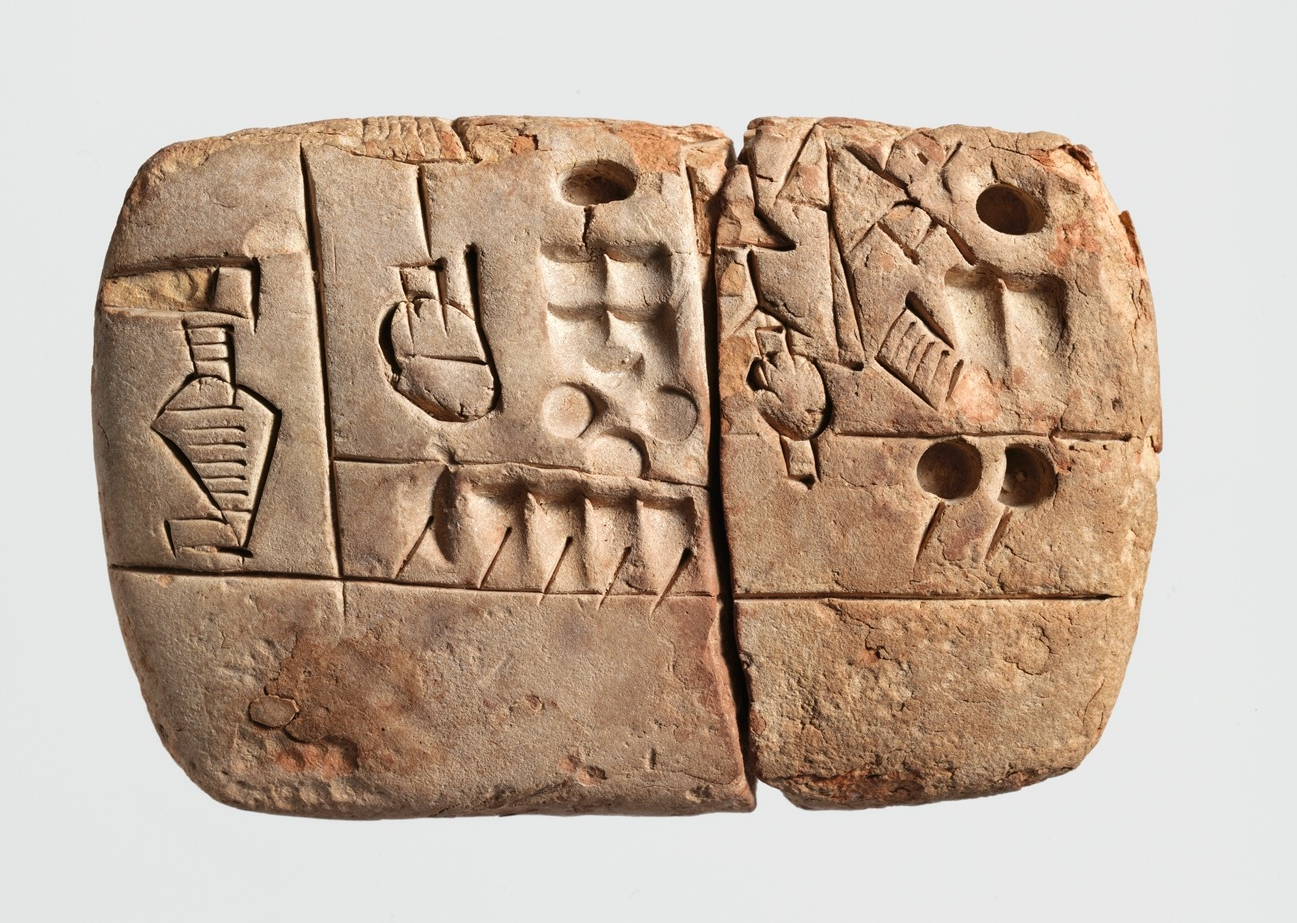
Proto-cuneiform administrative account concerning malt and barley groats (MET_DP293245)

About 170 similar tablets from Uruk V Susa, and other Iranian sites like Tepe Sialk, are considered to be pre-Proto-Elamite, though bearing similarities to proto-cuneiform. Sign lists and transliterations are less clear for this category.

Like Proto-Elamite, the system's propagation was relatively limited. The vast majority of the proto-cuneiform texts found, about 5,000, have been located in archaic Uruk (190 Uruk V, 1776 Uruk IV, 3094 Uruk III), though also in secondary contexts within the Eanna district. Many of the tablets were themselves later used as foundation fill during the construction of the Uruk III Eanna temple complex. It appears that the records were considered to be of transient utility or interest, and were quickly disposed of. The difficult stratigraphy has brought about a change from referring to tablets based on excavation layer to one of calling them script phase IV and III. Similarly to the tablets, clay seals previously used to secure vessels and doors ended up in the fill after being removed. The sites and analysis of sealing has led to suggestions that the tablets originated elsewhere and ended up at Uruk, where they were discarded.

A smaller number of tablets were found in Jemdet Nasr (2 Uruk V, 236 Uruk III), Umma (398 Uruk III), Eshnunna (2 Uruk III), Larsa (23 Uruk III), Kish (5 Uruk III), and Tell Uqair (39 Uruk III). They tend to be less fragmentary and are sometimes found in stratified contexts. Some have made their way into various private and public collections: the provenance for some can be determined from internal clues, but for some the origin city is unknown. For example, in 1988 ninety complete well-preserved tablets from the Swiss Erlenmeyer Collection in Basel were auctioned off with most ending up in public collections. The majority, fifty eight, were purchased by the State of Berlin and transferred to the Vorderasiatisches Museum as a permanent loan. A few others ended up at the British Museum and Louvre Museum.

A number of small rectangular or pillow-shaped baked "clay tags" were found in the Uruk IV–III levels at Uruk having a size roughly 25 millimeters by 20 millimeters. They have several proto-cuneiform characters and are pierced longitudinally with a hole, presumably to be hung on a string. Two clay tags were found at Susa bearing a single proto-cuneiform character. They are thought to be predecessors of later "pisan-dub-ba" tablets used to indicated contents of baskets.

Some tablets were sealed using a cylindrical seal. Two Uruk period clay sealings found at Ur had a single proto-cuneiform sign, ŠAM_{2}.

A few proto-cuneiform signs have been found on statue and vessel fragments.

It has been suggested that five flat axes and two bipartite spearheads found at the Early Dynastic I–II Birecik Dam Cemetery in the Carchemish region were etched with proto-cuneiform signs. The signs include "še (barley or cereal); dug_{b} + aš (a vessel and the number one); and a gada-like sign + six aš (a quantity of linen or cloth)".

It has been suggested that a tablet found during 1920s excavations at Kish, often called the Kish tablet, has signs possibly related to proto-cuneiform. It should not be confused with the Scheil dynastic tablet, which contains part of the Sumerian King List and is also sometimes called the Kish tablet.

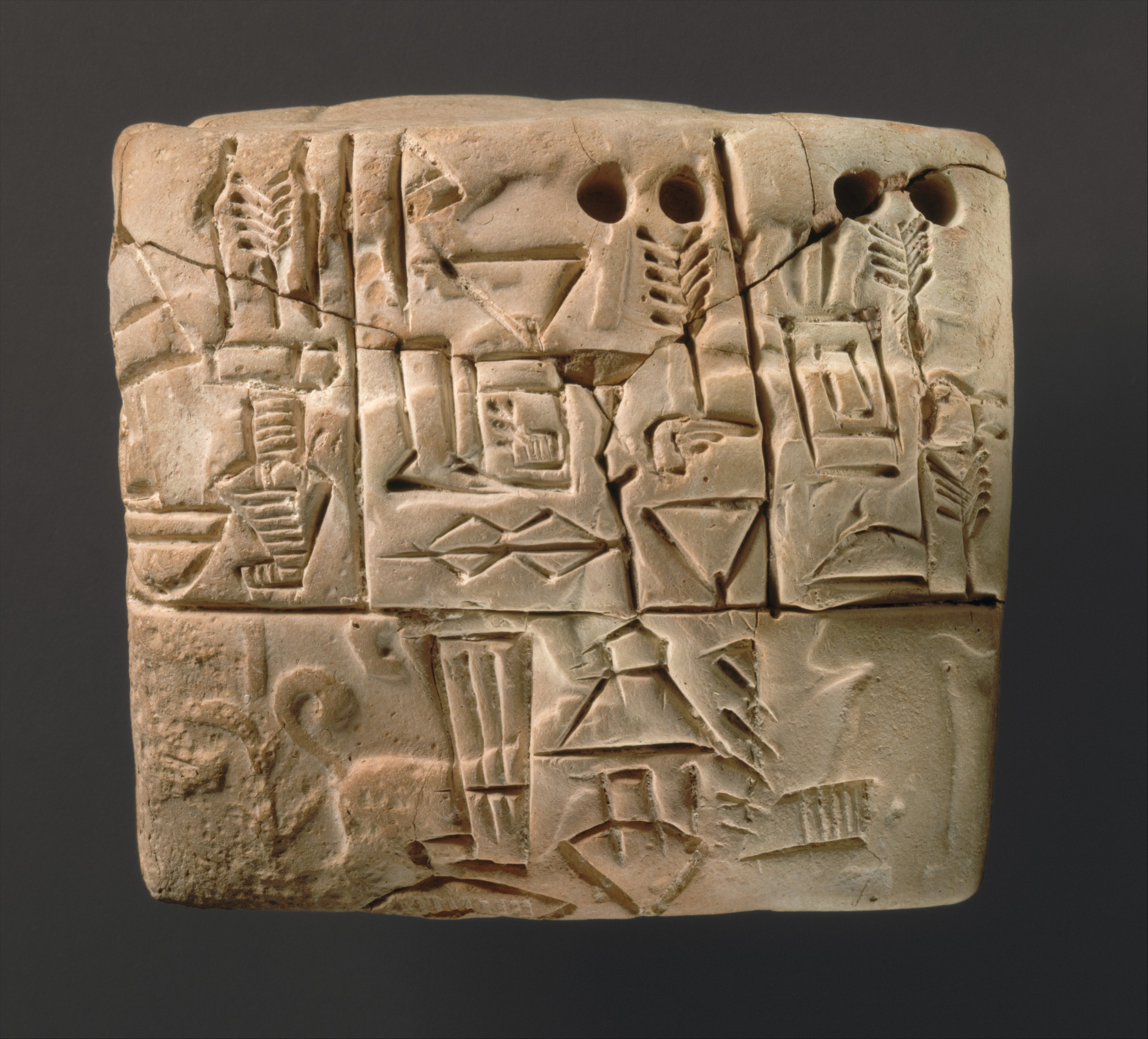
Sealed Proto-cuneiform Tablet – administrative account of barley distribution with cylinder seal impression of a male figure, hunting dogs, and boars (5.4 × 6 × 4.1 cm) (MET_DT847)

== Discovery and studies ==
=== History of studies ===
The proto-cuneiform tablets were first discovered on the antiquities market, coming from clandestine excavations. Probably excavated in the site of Jemdet Nasr, they were acquired by German excavators active at the site of Fara (Shuruppak) in 1903 and then in 1915. Other tablets from illegal excavations were acquired by the antiquities dealer J. E. Géjou in 1915, sold to other antiquities dealers, to the Louvre Museum as well as to the British Museum. The first tablets from regular excavations come from the site of Jemdet Nasr, excavated by an English team in 1925 and were first studied by S. Langdon. From 1928 onwards, after other scattered discoveries, German excavations of the site of Warka, ancient Uruk, brought to light thousands of tablets from the Uruk period, contemporary with those found in Jemdet Nasr, and others older. These tablets were first studied by Adam Falkenstein, who began their publication in Archaische Texte aus Uruk (1936).

One of Falkenstein's students, Hans J. Nissen, began in the 1970s a project to edit and re-edit the Uruk proto-cuneiform tablets, in a series that took the name Archaische Texte aus Uruk (ATU), while texts from other locations appeared in the series Materialen zu den Frühen Schriftzeugnissen der Voderen Oriens (MSVO). This collective work, involving in particular (in addition to Nissen) R. K. Englund, P. Damerow, J. Friberg, M. Green and J.-P. Grégoire, considerably advanced the understanding of these early testimonies of writing in Mesopotamia, although many gray areas still remain.

=== State of decipherment ===
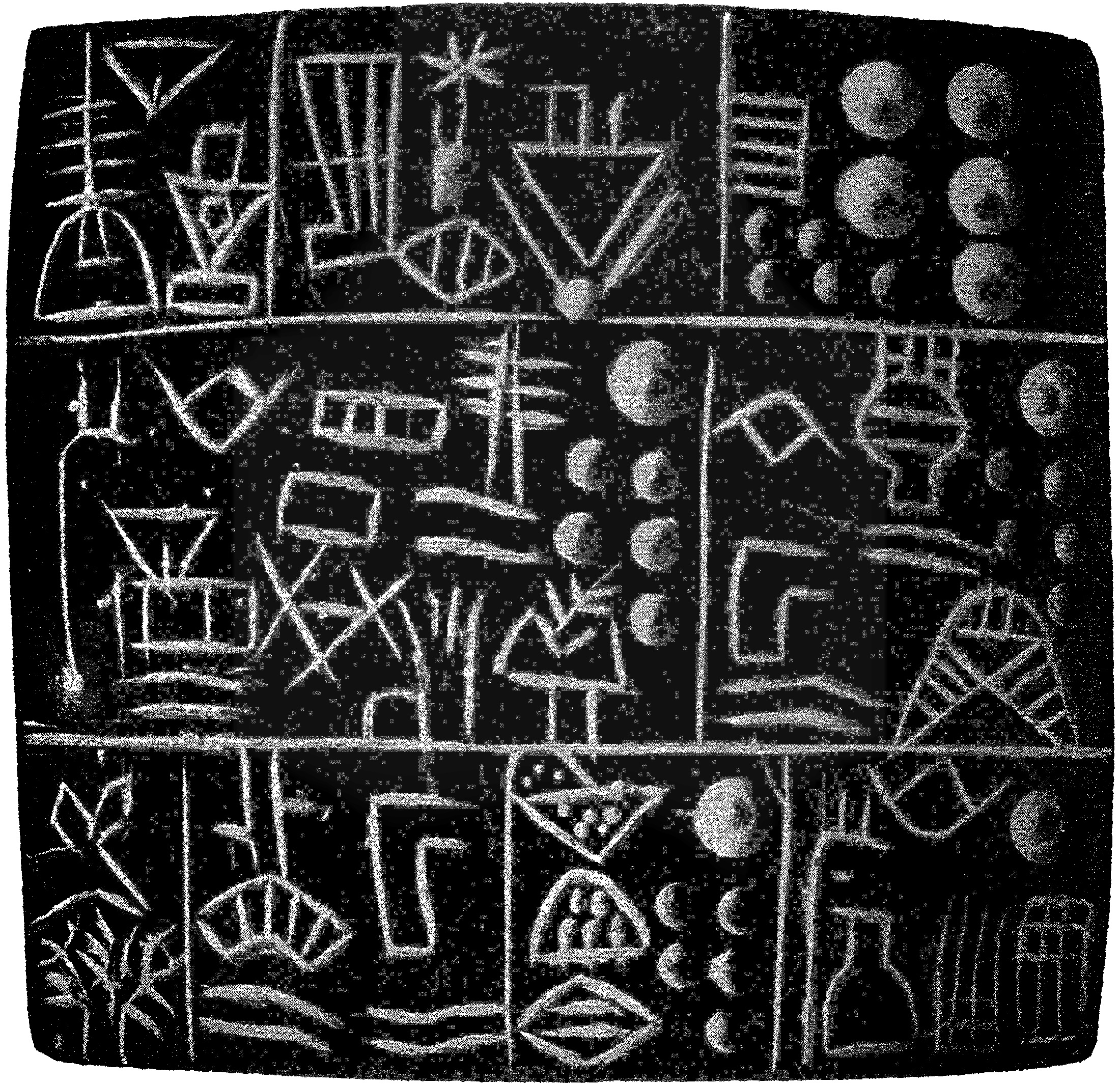
Archaic cuneiform tablet E.A. Hoffman

To decipher an unknown, fully functional writing system, scholars usually need some knowledge of the underlying spoken language, some bilingual texts, and a large corpus. Proto-cuneiform was not accessible in any of these ways, but decipherment was possible because it was not a full writing system, but a specialized notation for economic administration. Its texts were stereotyped and concrete, such as lists of items.

Already in 1928 with the first publication of texts, a numerical sign list had been developed, based on similarity to the signs of Fara, the earliest cuneiform texts which were the immediate successors of Proto-cuneiform. The sexagesimal numerals and area numbers were also essentially the same. The mathematical system of proto-cuneiform and Proto-Elamite was largely deciphered over a few decades beginning in the 1970s. Some details remain obscure, and several generally agreed-upon details remain contested. For example, the (ŠE system E) is thought to be a capacity measure, but this has been challenged because it is only found in the Uruk IV layers, not the later Uruk III, and it lacks the markers of a capacity measure.

As an example of the current partial state of decipherment, a small tablet found at Uruk (The Kushim referenced may be an individual or title or office):

3(N48) 1(N34) 6(N14) 1(N01) 1(N39_{a}), U4x(3(N14).7(N01)) SZE_{a} DUB_{a} LAGAB_{bx}LAGAB_{b} (KU_{b1} SZIM_{a})a SZA_{m2} - Transliteration
5617 1/5 N1's, exchange barley, 37 months, Kushim's final account. ca. 135,000 liters - Translation

== Signs ==
=== Inventory ===
Currently there are about 2,000 known proto-cuneiform signs: about 350 numerical, 1,100 individual ideographic, and 600 complex (combinations of individual signs). The non-numerical signs are attested in about 40,000 occurrences. There was a high degree of heterogeneity in sign usage: about 530 signs are only attested once, about 610 two to ten times, 370 attested 11 to 100 times, and about 104 signs attested more than 100 times. Many signs have been identified including those for barley and emmer wheat. The most common signs are EN_{a}, GAL_{a}, and ŠE_{a}.

Typical Proto-cuneiform signs (Uruk III)
DU_{7}	SAL	SUH_{3}	NIGIN	ERIN	KU_{6}	DIN	BULUG	NI_{2}
1	2	3	4	5	6	7	8	9
IGI	TIDNUM	GU_{2}	U_{4}	DAM	RI	IL	AL	KAK
10	20	30	40	50	60	70	80	90
MASZ_{2}	DI	SHUBUR	A	HI	SIKIL	TE	BAD	AMA
100	200	300	400	500	600	700	800	900

=== Numbers ===
Some of the proto-cuneiform signs are of numerical and metrological type. They are easily identifiable by their rounded (curviform) shape, consisting of circles or semicircles of varying sizes. As Englund describes:

These were impressed deep in the clay surface with the butt ends of two round styli of different diameters. As a rule, impressions of the larger stylus represent larger numbers or measures, those of the smaller styli numbers and measures from the lower scale of the numerical systems they represented.

The underlying numeric base of the Proto-cuneiform, like later cuneiform, is sexagesimal (base 60). Earlier researchers believed that this system rose out of an earlier decimal (base 10) substratum but that idea has now lost currency.

Different products used different measurement systems, which could change with the context. In a single tablet the (Bisexagesimal System B) could be used for grain rations, (ŠE system Š) for barley, and (ŠE system Š") for emmer wheat. Another was (ŠE system C) for capacity, typically of grain. There were thirteen numerical systems in total (Sexagesimal, Sexagesimal S', Bisexagesimal, Bisexagesimal B*, GAN_{2}, EN, U_{4}, ŠE, ŠE', ŠE", ŠE*, DUG_{b}, DUG_{c}) of which the contemporary Proto-Elamite writing system used only seven, and only half of the sixty proto-cuneiform numerical signs.

=== Logograms ===
Some proto-cuneiform logographic signs with meaning, examples, Uruk III shapes (drawings by R. Englund.).

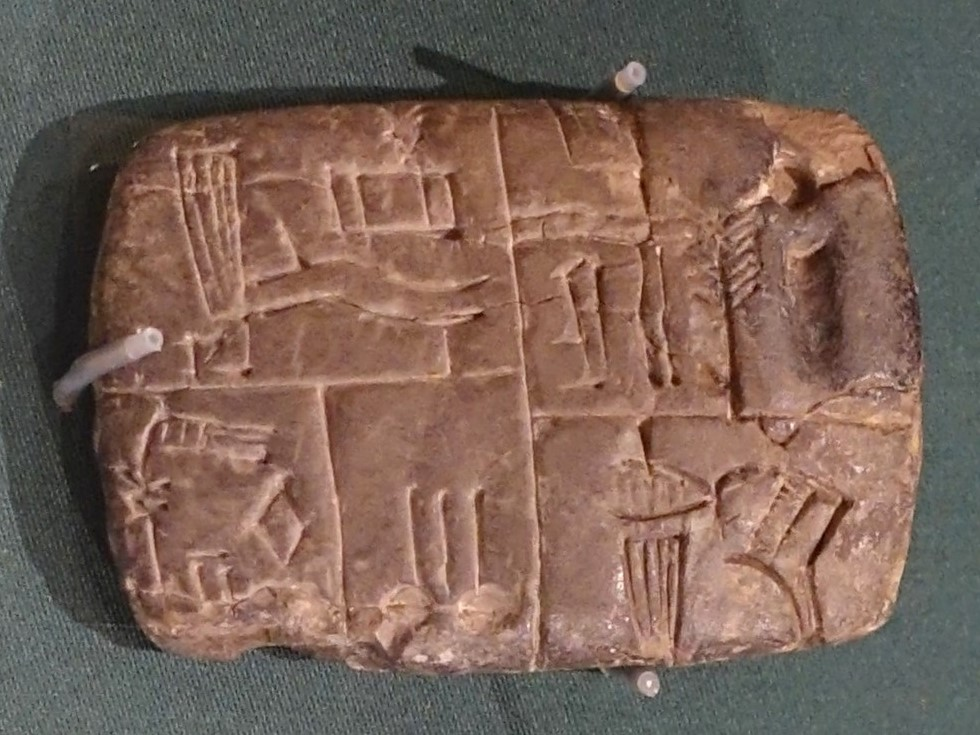
Administrative tablet from Tell Asmar, Uruk III phase. Oriental Institute Museum, Chicago. In particular visible in the case at the top right are the pictograms of the barley ŠE (in the shape of an ear) and the temple E_{2} (partly on the edge); the reed GI is visible in the case at the bottom left. The sign repeated in the cases at the top left and bottom right consisting of an elongated quadrangular shape with stripes, SANGA, designates an administrator, and could represent, according to Englund, a calculation instrument used by Urukean accountants.

The emergence of writing is characterized by the appearance of non-numerical signs, which are fundamentally logograms, signs that indicate a word. Thus, a sign can designate a tangible thing, for example barley, reeds, fish, a mountain, the mouth, and also an intangible thing such as speech or the voice, or an action, such as taking, going, or speaking.

Proto-cuneiform writers used more than 1,500 non-numerical signs, but very unevenly: more than 500 are used only once, another 600 less than ten times, and about 100 signs are used more than ten times, two of which (ENa and GALa, names of people or offices) appear more than 1000 times each. Significant developments took place between the period of Uruk IV and that of Uruk III: the number of signs in the repertoire exploded, which demonstrates a great capacity for innovation and a desire to record operations in greater detail.

The meaning of the proto-cuneiform signs is often understood through knowledge of the later cuneiform system, when it is possible to identify a proto-cuneiform sign as the ancestor of a cuneiform sign. In particular, the fact that the sign lists developed in the Uruk period were copied and transmitted during the following centuries allows for correspondences to be made. But the meaning of many signs still remains obscure.

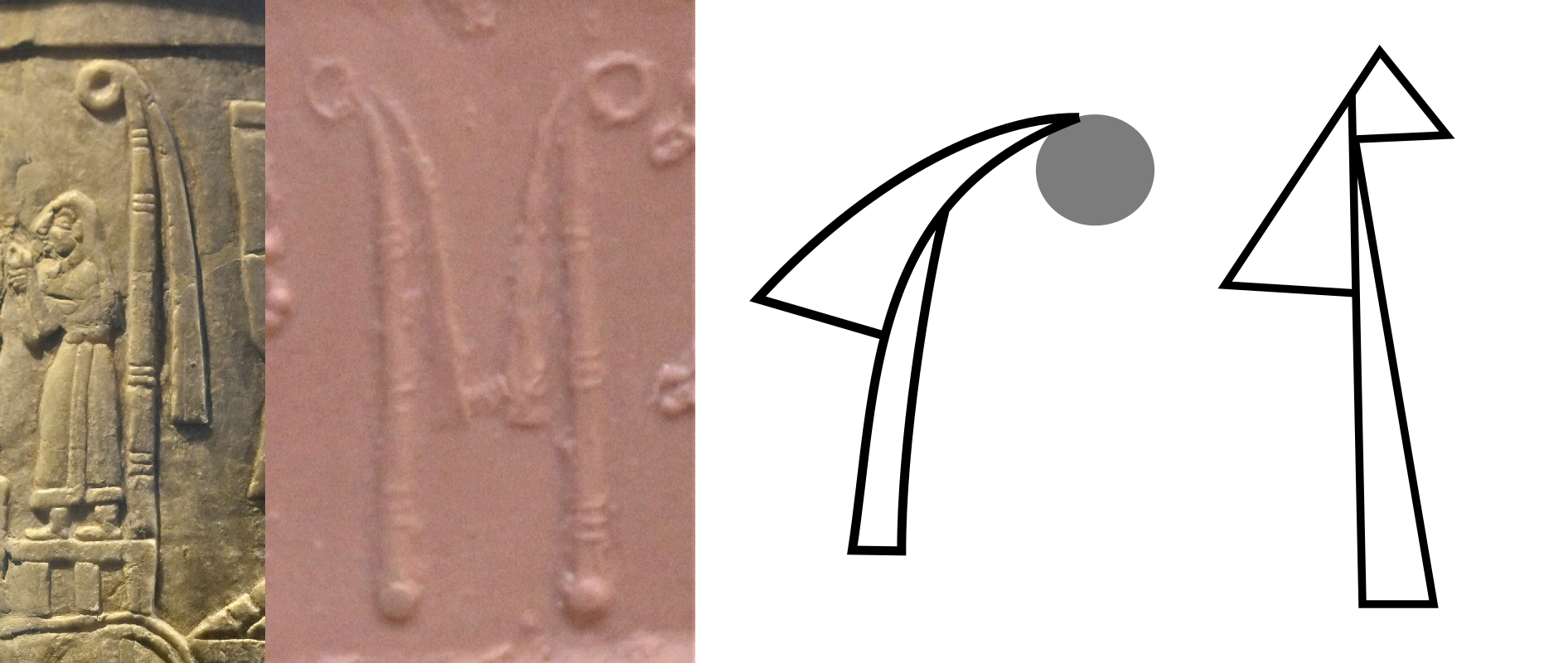
A religious symbol becomes a proto-cuneiform sign: the divine standard of the goddess Inanna, which became the logogram MUŠ_{3} designating the goddess. From left to right: on the Warka Vase; on a cylinder seal; copy after a tablet from the Uruk IV phase; copy after a tablet from the Uruk III phase.

The origin of the signs is also debated. For Englund, the majority of signs have a pictographic origin: they are originally figurative signs, drawings representing and designating real things. This seems to be the case at least for the Uruk IV phase. It is possible to distinguish different types of pictographic signs. Some represent the object in its entirety, other only a part of it. The latter type will nevertheless signify the totality (pars pro toto) of the object: for example, an animal's head to designate an animal. A pictogram can also represent an action, for example the hand represents the action of giving or receiving, a container (jar, vase or basket) can designate its contents (milk, butter, cereals or even a ration). But quite quickly, and at least in the Uruk III phase, a significant number of signs are totally abstract. Nissen identifies 98 of them. He also emphasizes that few pictorial signs are naturalistic, but are already very abstract. This leads him to consider that proto-cuneiform is not pictographic and draws on pre-existing graphic codes. Indeed, the origin or at least the inspiration of several proto-cuneiform signs could be identified in other administrative instruments or figurative representations from the Uruk period: tokens, seals, motifs appearing on cylinder seals and other bas-reliefs, notably representations of divine emblems.

Most of the corpus consists of signs derived from previous ones. Indeed, rather than inventing new forms, Urukean administrators favored creation, by modifying existing forms. This is done in particular by combining two signs: for example, the association of the head (SAG) and the bowl (GUR), which is equivalent to "ration," gives the meaning of "payment/spending (of ration)" (GU_{7}). Another example: the sign designating the city of Larsa, city of the Sun God, is the combination of the sign of the sun (U_{4} or UD) and the sign designating a cult installation (AB), which clearly refers to the tutelary god of the city and his cult. The creation of new signs can also be done by graphic differentiation from a single sign, in particular by means of hatching, doubling, mirror representation, etc.; thus the sign of the head hatched at the mouth will refer to this part of the body, and the sign of the sheep with hatches will designate a lamb. A whole set of signs is derived from that signifying the jar (DUG), to designate things that it could contain in the stores of the institutions. This demonstrates that writing is quickly the subject of a process of abstraction and new inventions, all of this being largely determined by the search for signs more easily traceable in clay. Proto-cuneiform system is based on a group of basic signs, frequently used, which serve as a model for creating derived signs. These may be used only very rarely and have no posterity. This reflects the fact that writing habits seem to vary between offices, which explains why certain signs are commonly used in texts written in the same place, but never or almost never elsewhere.

=== Phonetism? ===
As to whether the proto-cuneiform system had some phonetic signs (phonograms), that is signs that refers directly to spoken word, or not, it is also a matter of debate, related to the "Sumerian question" and the language(s) spoken by the inventors of proto-cuneiform.

Logographic signs can potentially be used according to the principle of the rebus, so as to refer the reader to a homonymous term for which there is no sign, notably abstractions. Thus, in the later cuneiform system, the garden sign SAR is used to designate the action of writing, sar in Sumerian. This allows an evolution towards the constitution of a set of phonetic signs, called "syllabograms" since they represent a syllable. Thus the water sign A is also used for the syllable [a].

Determining whether this aspect of cuneiform writing is already present in proto-cuneiform is problematic and has been the subject of much discussion, particularly because it brings back to the question of whether the language spoken by the scribes of the Uruk IV and III periods was Sumerian or not. Indeed, to understand the sound derived from a sign, it is necessary to know in which language it is pronounced. Most specialists consider, on the basis of a limited number of examples, that the principle of the rebus based on a Sumerian reading of certain signs is present in proto-cuneiform texts. But even if this is the case, these occurrences are very rare, and the proto-cuneiform system is considered essentially non-phonetic. It is generally accepted that its aim (or main aim) is not to transcribe a spoken language and to reproduce sentences.

=== Shape ===
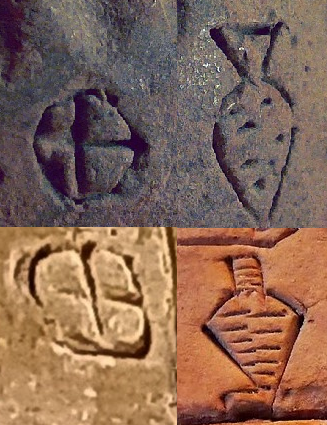
Comparison of the writing of two proto-cuneiform signs, UDU "sheep" (left) and KAŠ "beer" (right), on tablets from both phases: above, Uruk IV phase with rounded shapes; below, Uruk III phase with reduced curves and more straight-line sections.

A significant graphic evolution occurs, changing the shape of the proto-cuneiform logographic signs, between the Uruk IV and Uruk III phases. The way in which scribes imprint their reed styluses into the fresh clay in order to trace the signs evolves, in order to write more efficiently. This method tends to eliminate rounded shapes in favor of straight lines, which are quicker to draw. As Nissen explains:

Characteristic of the Level IV texts is that after making an oblique imprint into the surface of the tablet the stylus then is drawn out enabling the scribe to produce curved lines in addition to straight ones. The technique changes to the following stage of Archaic Level III as the stylus is imprinted in a way that only straight lines can be produced dissolving the former curved lines into series of straight ones. This gives the signs the abstract shape anticipating the look of later cuneiform.

This evolution, which continued in subsequent periods, resulted in a "loss of iconicity": the signs of Mesopotamian writing gradually lost their pictographic aspect. They became more schematic, consisting only of straight lines, constituting short segments, before subsequently taking on their cuneiform aspect characterized by the triangular-shaped mark (or "wedge") made when the tip of the reed stylus, cut at an angle, is planted in the clay. As a result, when observing the signs of later cuneiform writing, it is no longer possible to identify their pictographic proto-cuneiform origin, when they have one.

== Texts ==
=== Materials and media ===
In order to write the first texts (as well as for the precursors of writing such as tokens and bullae), the administrators of southern Mesopotamia primarily used the most abundant materials in their region: clay and reed.

Clay was used to make writing media, mainly in the form of tablets. Although clay was by far the most common material, some texts were written on stone tablets, and it is also possible that other perishable materials were used. The choice of clay, a durable material, is responsible for the large amount of documentation preserved in proto-cuneiform, compared to the earliest writing systems from other parts of the world.

The instrument used to trace the signs in fresh clay was made from a carved reed stalk: stylus. As writing developed, the shapes of these styluses undoubtedly diversified. Two types eventually became dominant: styluses with a beveled tip that made wedge-shaped marks for non-numerical signs, and those with a rounded tip that made circular or semi-circular marks for numerical signs.

The oldest proto-cuneiform tablets clearly derive from numerical tablets and have a simple format: they are small, written on one side only, and contain a limited amount of information. Transaction receipts preserve this simple form. Later, during Uruk III period, larger and more complex tablets appeared, divided into several cases and sub-cases organized in rows or columns, written on both sides.

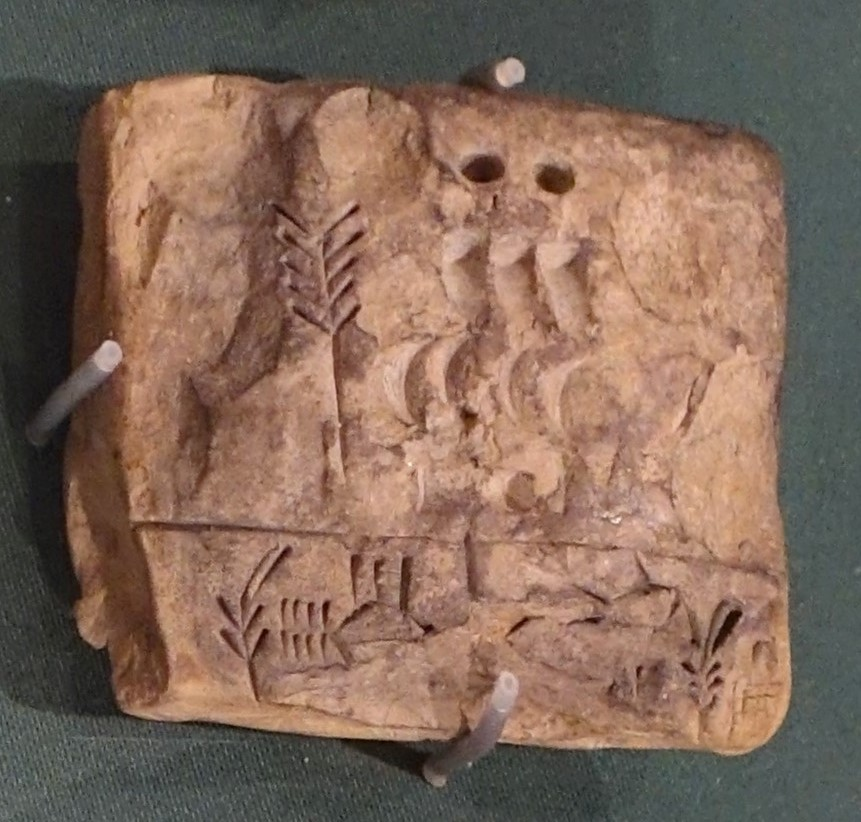
Square-shaped administrative tablet, Uruk III, from Jemdet Nasr. Oriental Institute Museum, Chicago.

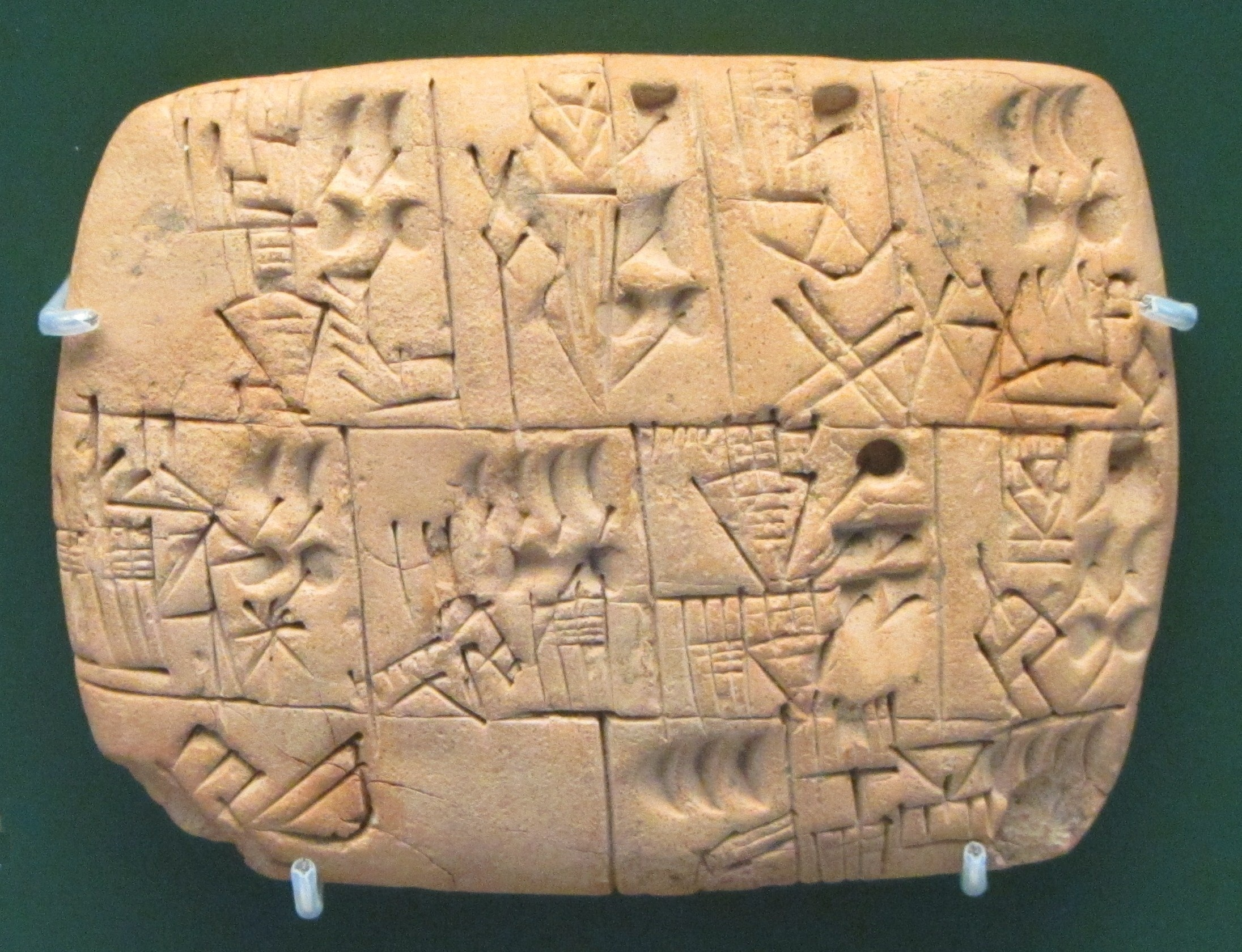
Rectangular-shaped administrative tablet, divided into cases and rows, Uruk III, provenance unknown. British Museum. Records the distribution of beer, represented by the sign KAŠ, a vase with a hatched interior. Five types of numerical signs are used.

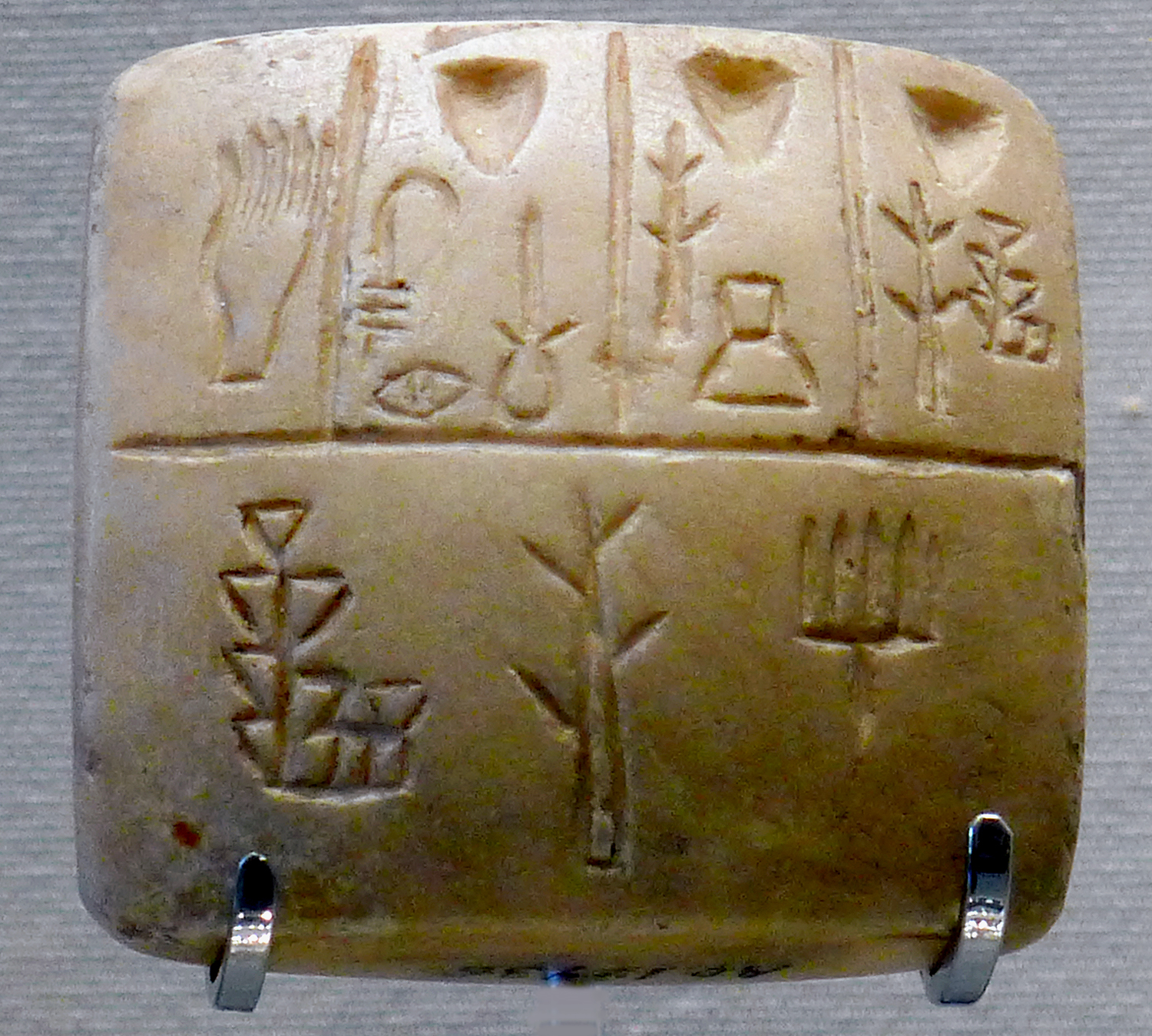
Administrative limestone tablet, Uruk III, provenance unknown. Louvre Museum. List of proper names on a personnel register(?).

Other clay tablets are much simpler: labels, so called because they are pierced with a hole, indicating that they were attached by a string to a container. Inscriptions on vases have also been discovered.

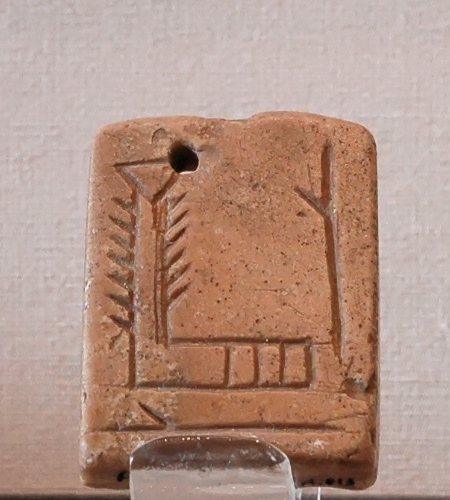
Label with the EN sign, Uruk III, provenance unknown. Louvre Museum.

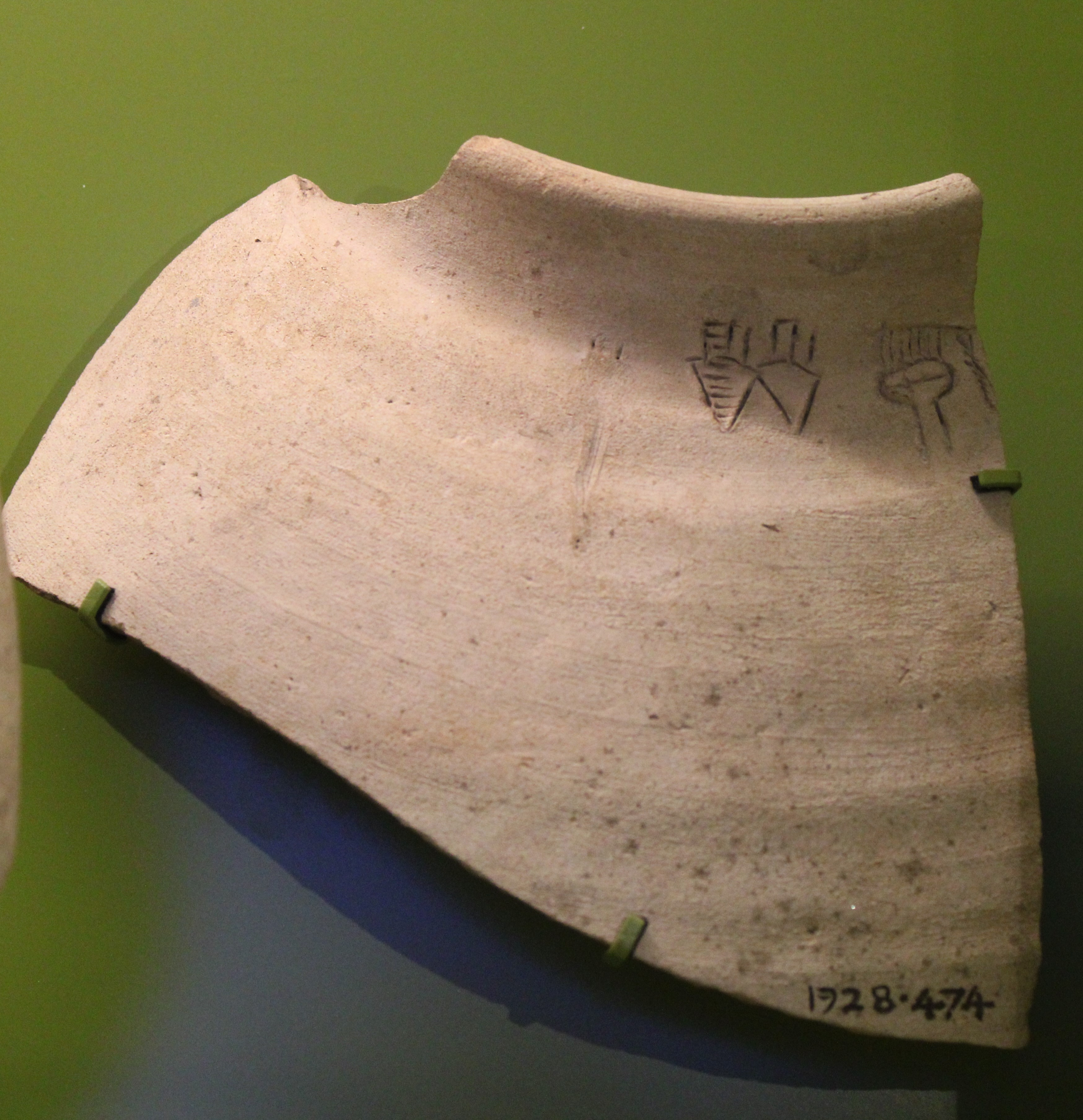
Vessel sherd with pictographic inscription, excavated in Jemdet Nasr. Ashmolean Museum. The two signs on the left are KAŠ "beer" and DUG "vase", i.e. the contents of the vase; the two signs on the right are the sequence ENa NEa, probably a title or profession.

=== Administrative ===
The vast majority of proto-cuneiform texts, approximately 85% of the total (about 2000 from the Uruk IV period and 3600 from Uruk III), are administrative, bookkeeping records. As explained by Englund: "As an accounting system, proto-cuneiform served above all to communicate and store administrative data."

The accounting tablets from the Uruk IV period, similar to earlier numerical tablets, are generally small and written on one side only, containing limited information and being concise. They often combine a few numerical signs with pictograms. The aim is to identify a transaction with the product, the quantity, and the person or administrative office receiving or shipping the goods. However, from the Uruk IV period onward, more complex tablets appeared: divided into cases and columns, they recorded several transactions, one per section. Some included numerical notes on the reverse side summarizing the quantities recorded on the front, with the identification of the products and the offices responsible. The Uruk III period saw an increase in the complexity of this type of tablet, with more developed summaries. Tablets tended to become larger, written in several columns and on both sides. Labels (attested for both phases), that were probably attached to products (or to the bags, or to the boxes, containing those products), are unique in that they do not include any numerical signs, but only logograms indicating the content or the office responsible for the goods to which they are attached.

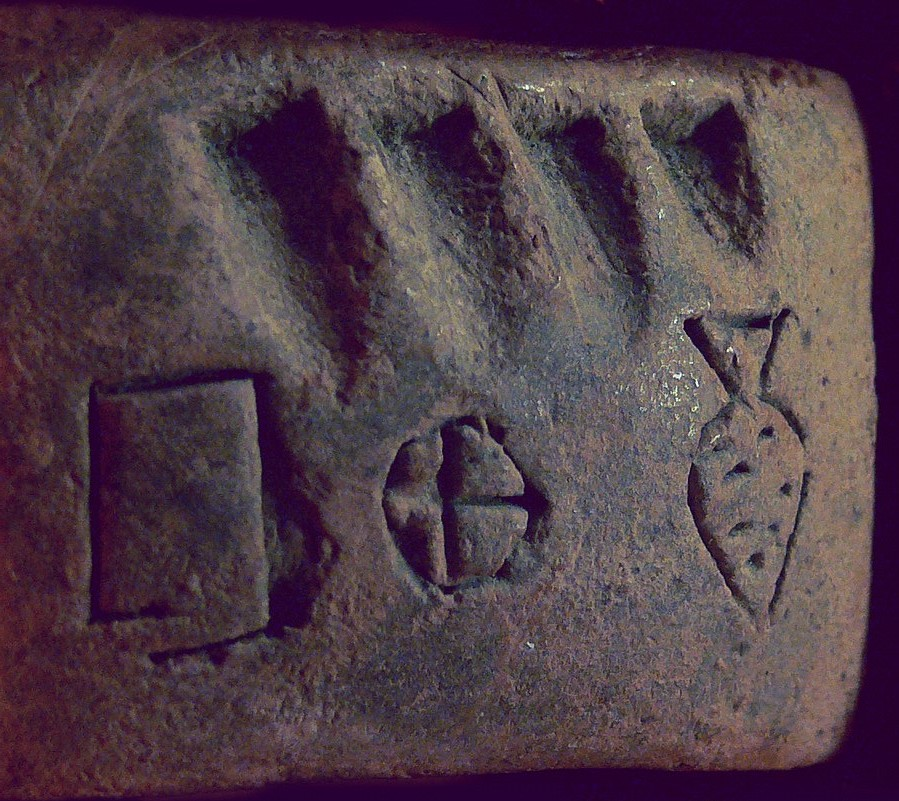
Uruk IV administrative tablet, with four notches, each worth 1 (numerical sign N01), from right to left the pictograms KAŠ "beer", UDU "sheep", and another of unknown meaning (ZATU762). Pergamon Museum.

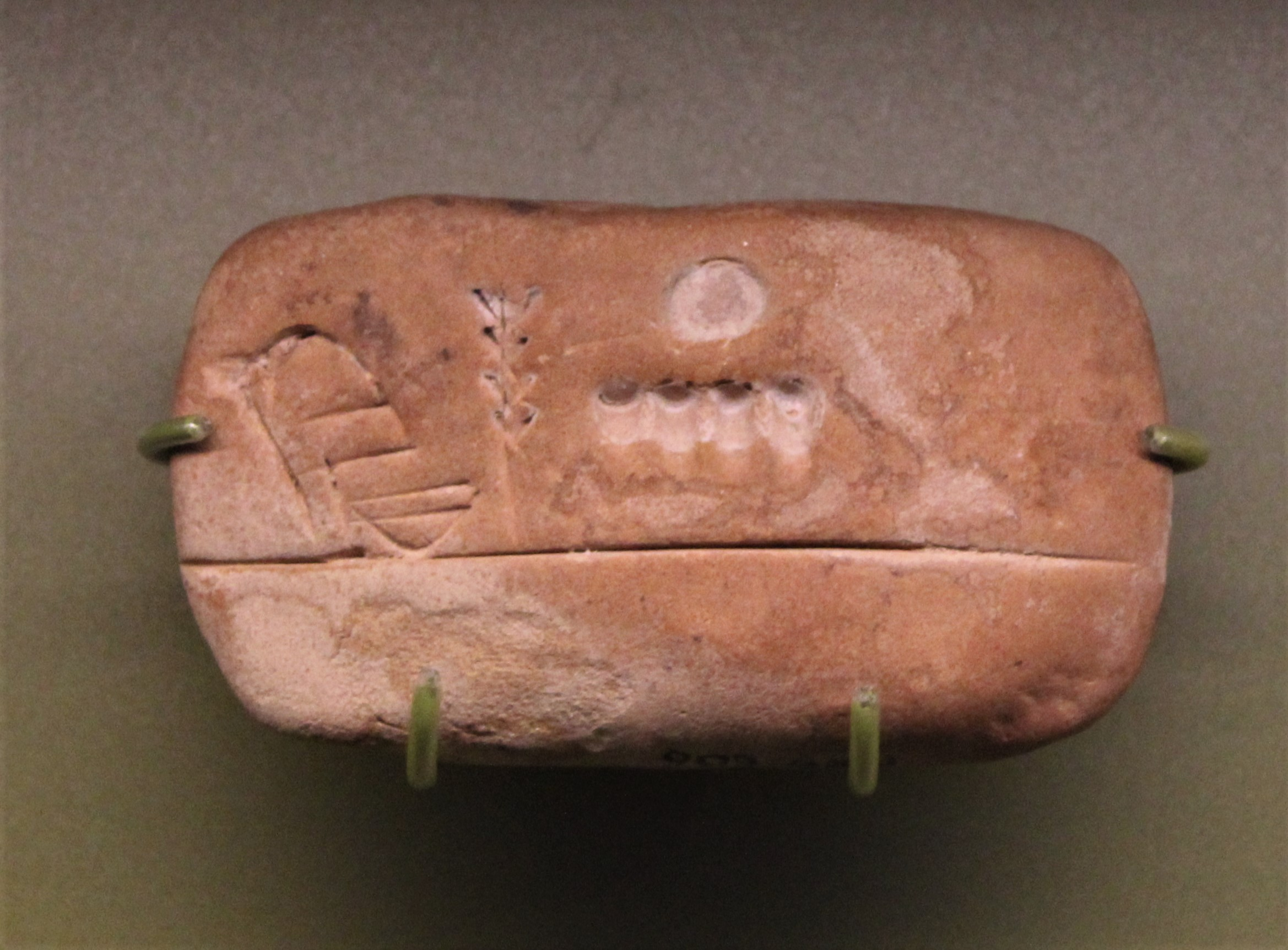
Uruk III administrative tablet from Jemdet Nasr. Ration account, here the reverse side which consolidates the data appearing on the front: the sign on the left combining the head and the bowl means "payment/expenditure" GU_{7}, the stalk to its right means "barley" ŠE; on the right the numbers in the cereal counting system: the large circle worth 60 (N45) and the notches each worth 1 (N01). Ashmolean Museum.

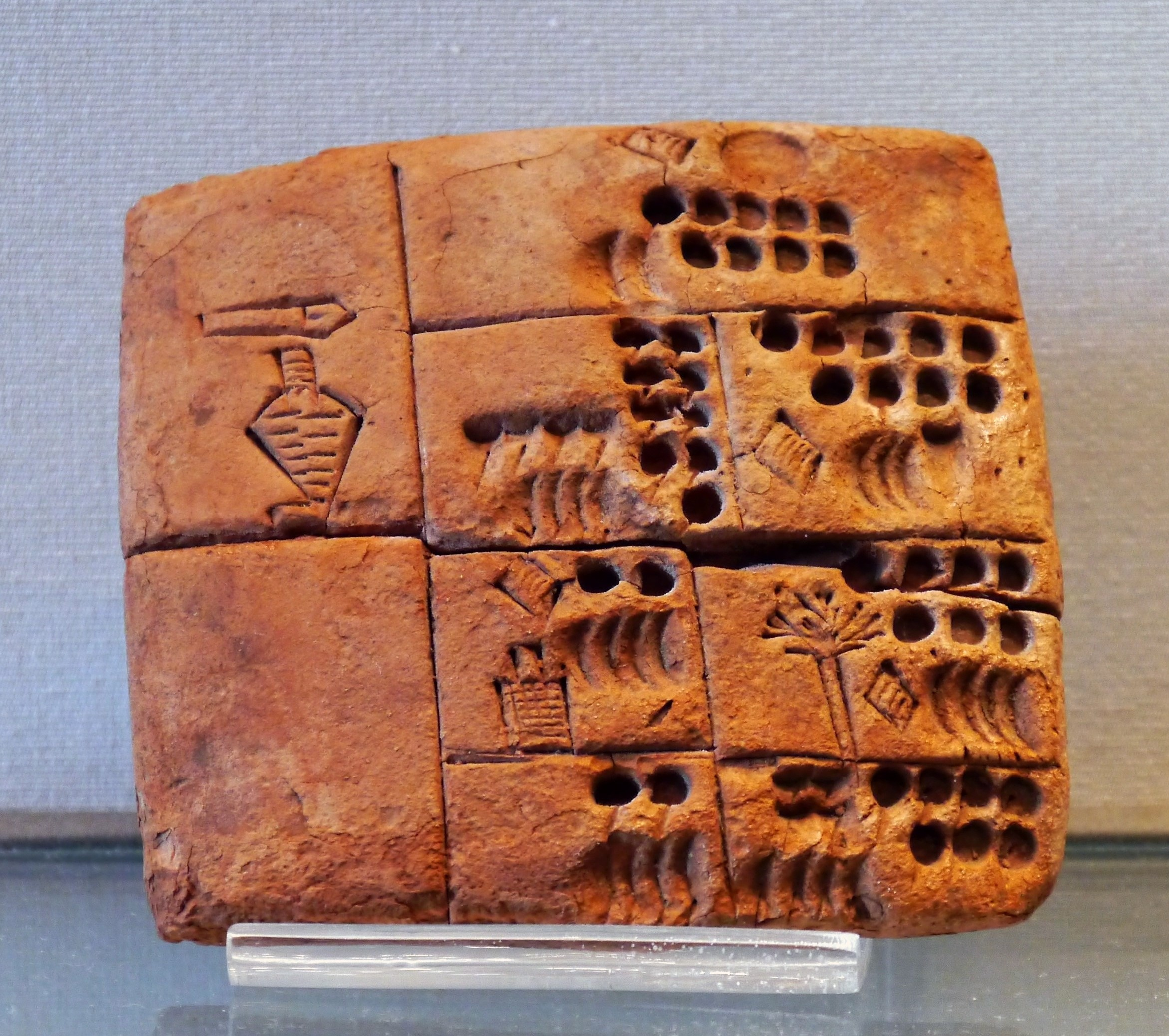
Uruk III administrative tablet (from Uruk?). Accounts of products used to make beer. In the upper left case, the combination of two signs KU.ŠIM seems to designate a person or office in charge of a brewery, because it is found on other tablets accounting for beer and products used in its production. Louvre Museum.

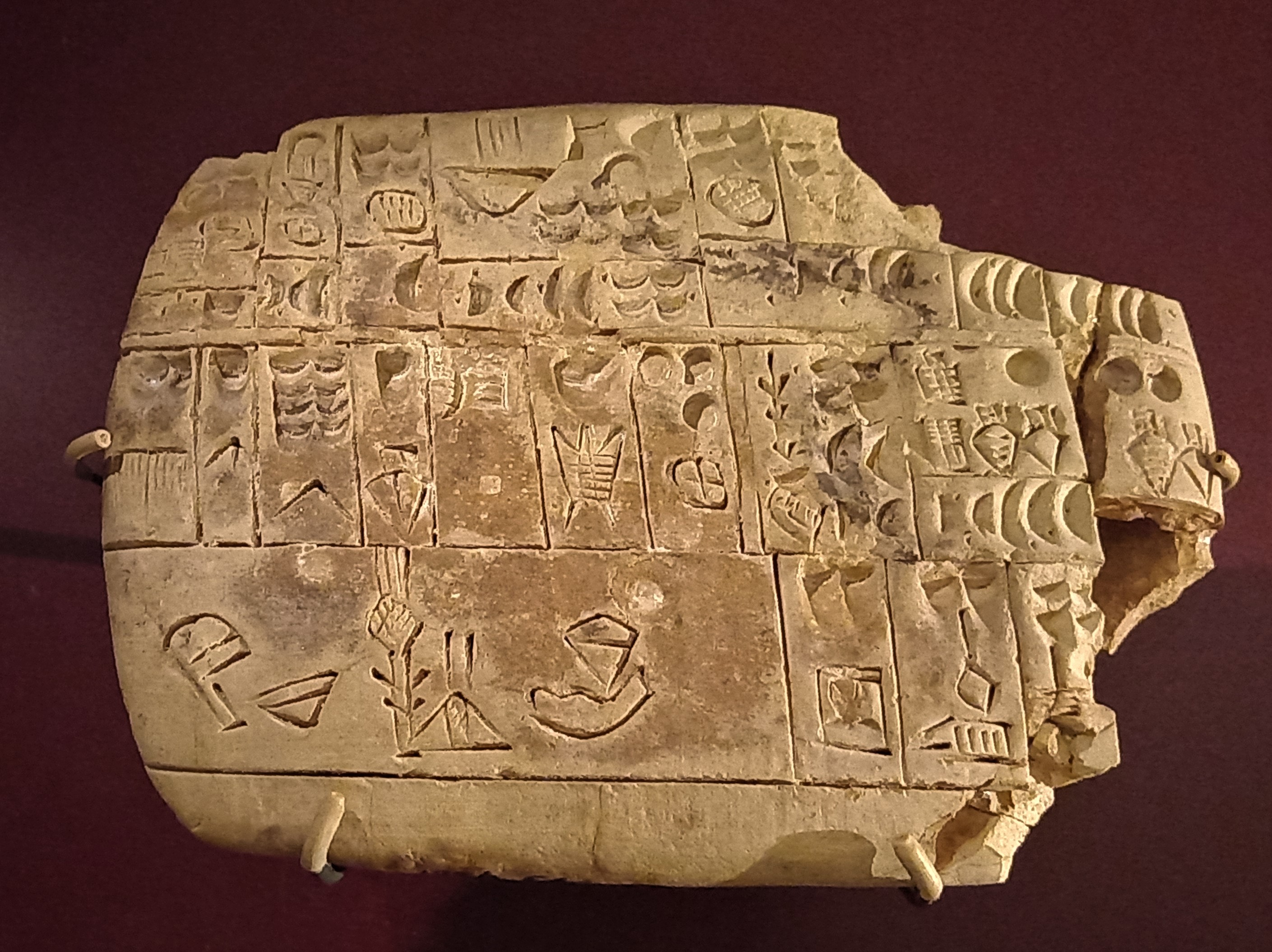
Uruk III administrative tablet from Jemdet Nasr. Complex accounting operation, with a count of rations, particularly in grain, in several cases on the front (in the photograph) and on the back summarizing the data for each product. Ashmolean Museum.

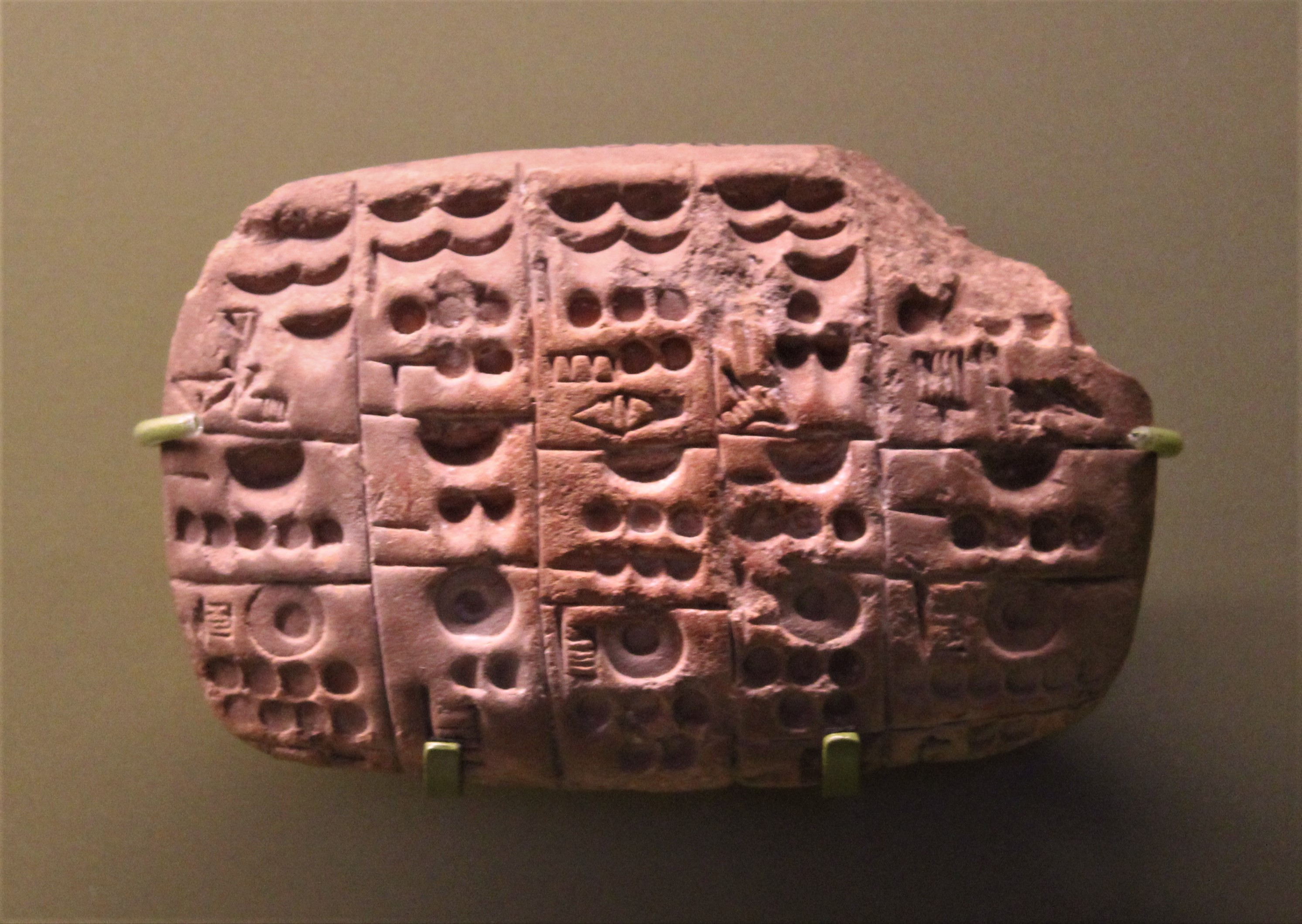
Uruk III administrative tablet from Jemdet Nasr. Calculation and addition of the areas of five fields. Each column concerns one of the five fields, the areas are added together and then divided into three parts; two parts (i.e. 2/3 of the area) are allocated to the EN ("Lord"), a high official (perhaps the head of the State), and the remainder (1/3) is distributed among five other important people, one of whom may be the wife of the EN (SAL.EN). Ashmolean Museum.

Proto-cuneiform administrative tablets are used to record product movements, varying in complexity. According to Nissen:

The texts deal with deliveries to a central store and the distribution of agricultural products of all kinds, i.e., foodstuffs in the broad sense and other raw materials, as well as personnel and labor management. In some cases, it is possible to identify the recipients as high-ranking officials [...]. At present, we know nothing about those who delivered the foodstuffs, although this would be of great interest for reconstructing the economic system.

These accounts appear to have been produced by offices, sections of the administration responsible for a specific task, such as a grain store. They may record totals over long periods of time, to be used for monitoring the situation, and perhaps for forecasting purposes, for example to determine how much grain to set aside for the next sowing season.

These bookkeeping documents ultimately serve purposes similar to those of their predecessors (tokens, envelopes, numerical tablets), namely to facilitate the management of the uninterrupted and ever-increasing flow of products handled by the stores and administrative offices of Uruk institutions. But they clearly do so in a more comprehensive manner. Administrative tablets do not seem to document other concerns, which explains why they do not provide much information about the administrative structure of their time.

=== Lexical ===
Proto-cuneiform non-administrative tablets are called "sign lists" or "lexical lists". They constitute approximately 15% of the known corpus, but they are very unevenly distributed between the two phases: they constitute only 1% of the Uruk IV corpus compared to 20% of the Uruk III corpus. This would indicate a development of this type of tablet during the second period.

As their name suggests, these texts are lists or rather inventories of signs, enumerated one after the other, following a thematic principle, as they are linked by semantic connections. These lists can be grouped into several general categories according to their theme, which are often known from several examples: lists of places/cities, lists of animals, lists of plants and manufactured goods, and lists of people/professions. This results in tablets that are easily identifiable by their external characteristics: they are made up of small cases arranged in columns, each containing a sign or a group of signs, accompanied by the basic numerical sign of the sexagesimal system S (N01).

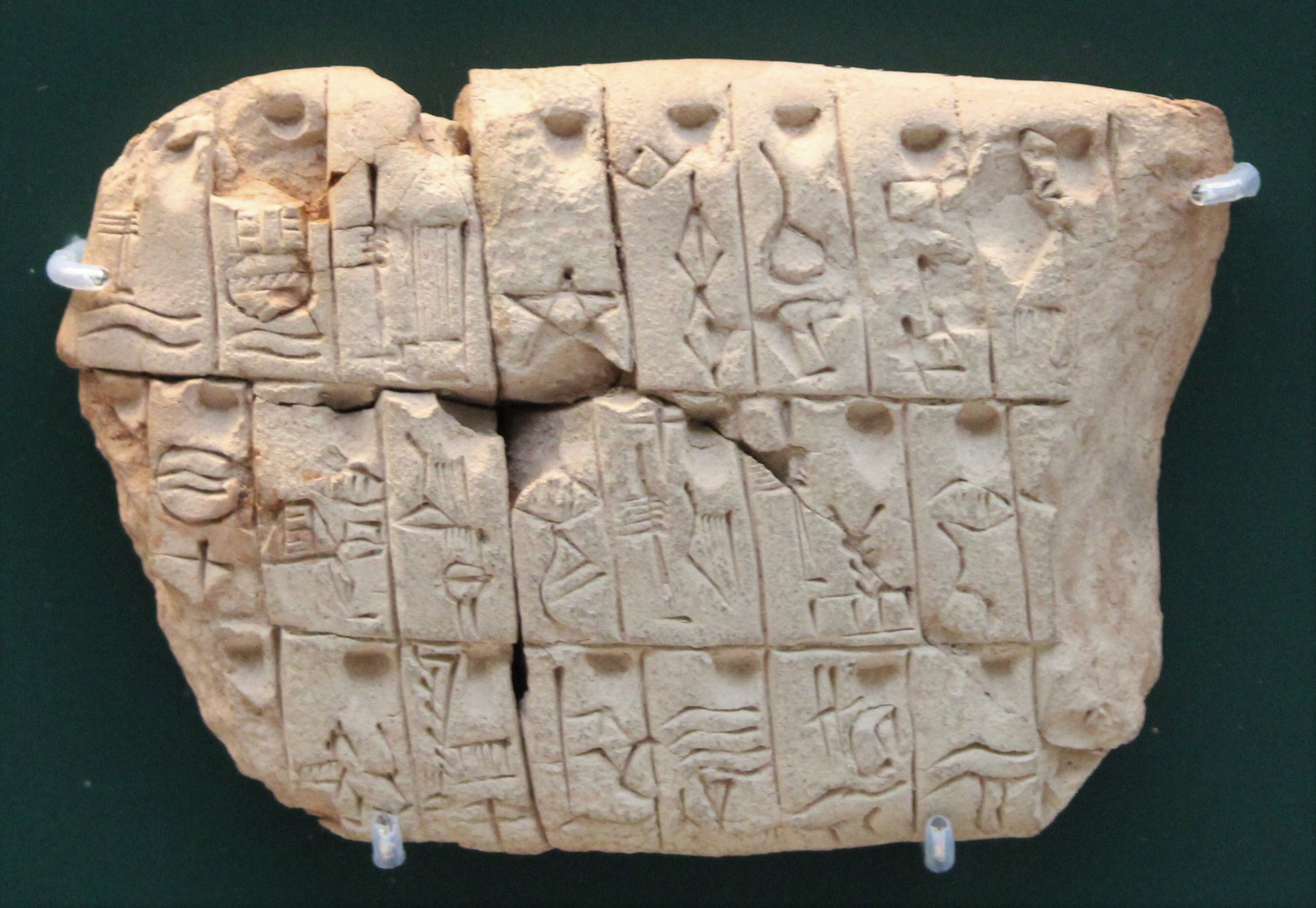
List of cities, Jemdet Nasr. Among the first in the list are well-known cities such as Ur, Nippur, Larsa and Uruk. The order in which they appear could reflect a mythological or cultic hierarchy. British Museum.

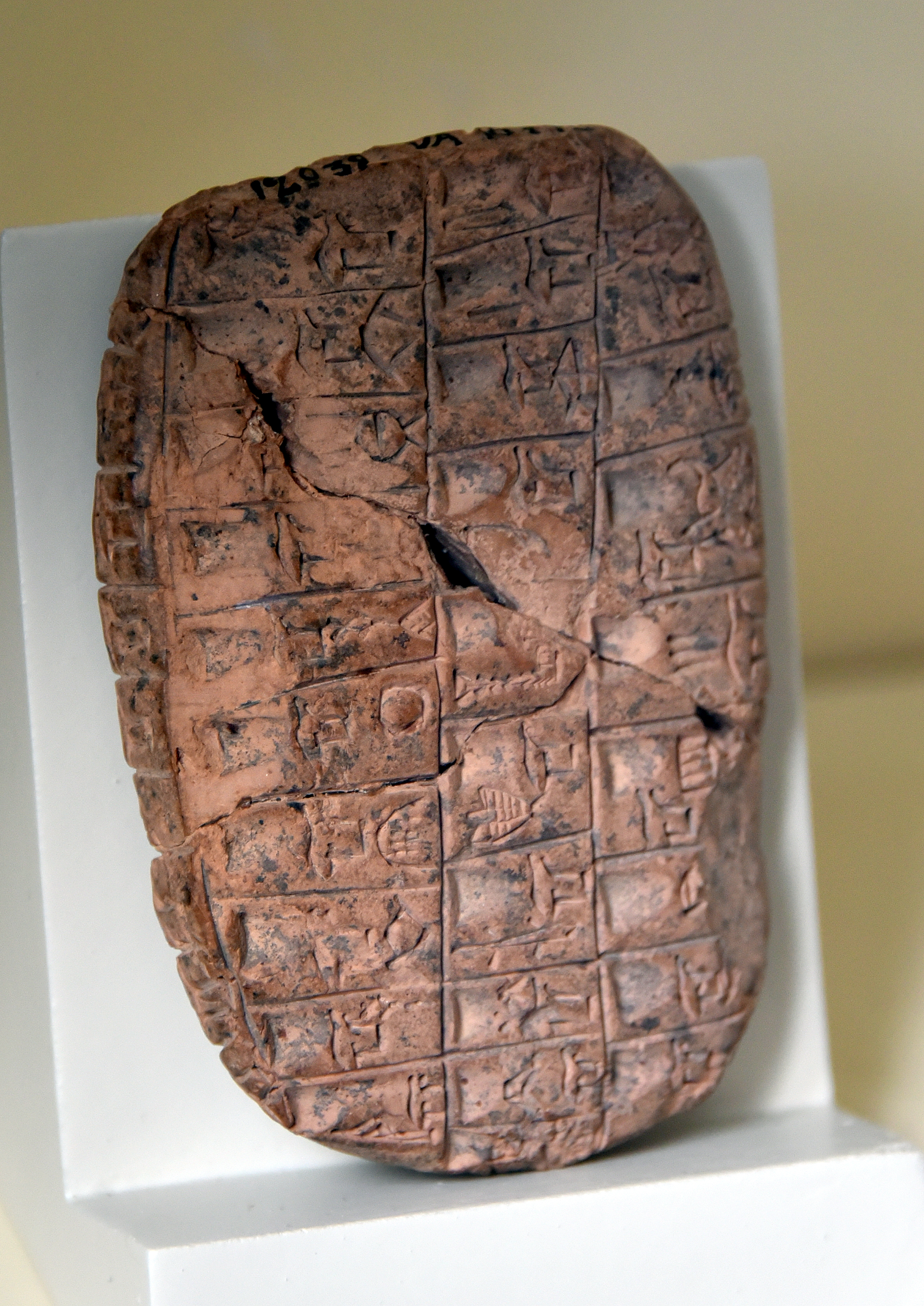
List of swines (ŠUBUR), Uruk. This is one example of an animal list, the others listing bovids, fish, and birds. Pergamon Museum.

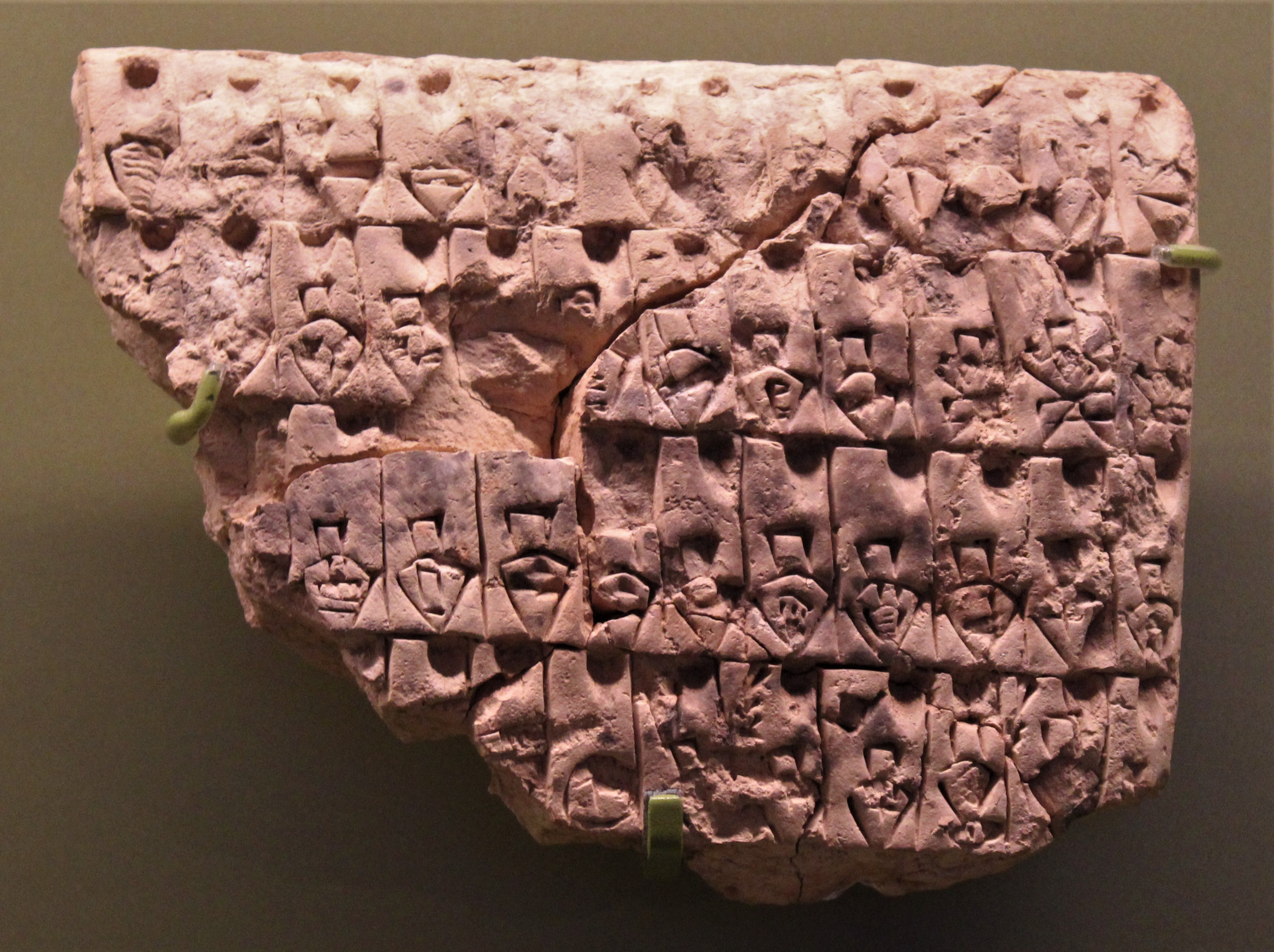
List of pots, Jemdet Nasr. This is one of the most attested lists. The first section of the list, attested here, includes signs derived from that of the jar, visually differentiated by the signs drawn inside the pictogram, which allow them to be distinguished according to their contents. The first signs seem to designate containers of dairy products. Ashmolean Museum.

List of people, composite version made by R. Englund based on the copies found.

Lists of individuals compile professions and administrative offices, which could be organized according to a hierarchical principle: the first position listed, NÁM.EŠDA, is, according to Nissen, the title worn by the most important figure of the time. Next come other individuals whose job titles begin with the sign NÁM, meaning “chief,” those responsible for areas related to administration, who seem to be listed one after the other according to their importance. These lists could therefore be lists of officials, providing clues about the administrative organization of the time, which would already be imposing and diversified.

These lists often include signs that are not attested in administrative tablets, which could reflect a taste for scholarly speculation. If so, some of the signs found there are somewhat fictional. But this point is debated. They seem to focus on the environment of the time and its economic practices. They were probably used to teach writing and its signs, for the drafting of administrative tablets. But they undoubtedly served other purposes as well. It has been observed that the signs are not arranged randomly one after the other, but according to a specific classification principle. For example, a hierarchical/honorific order seems to exist in certain cases (lists of people, lists of cities). This suggests that the order in which the signs are written in these lists was carefully thought out in advance. In 1936, W. von Soden proposed that they were used to record and organize the world, an idea that convinced some specialists, but not all. In any case, they are at the origin of a type of lexicographical work characteristic of the Mesopotamian literary tradition, several of whose canonical compositions derive from the lists of the Uruk period.

One of these texts stands out: the “Tribute List” (or “Word List C”), which combines various types of signs (numbers, animals, products). It has been interpreted as either the oldest known literary work or, more simply, a quick reference guide summarizing the most commonly used signs in the proto-cuneiform system.

At least, the existence of lexical proto-cuneiform texts means that this system was already more than just a bookkeeping system. As highlighted in the work of Jack Goody, the invention of writing carried the seeds of significant cognitive developments, an intellectual revolution, visible in particular in the lists of signs. According to B. Lafont:

The consequences of writing on cognitive processes, its potential to deploy new means of communication, have caused a change in the perception of the world among those who invented it. It has allowed the development of a different system of thought and has gradually given its users new ways, not only to project themselves into time and space, but also to undertake a reflection on the world and its organization.

=== Layout ===
Administrative texts describe economic operations in a concise manner. They are organized around numerical signs accompanied by logograms. They identify the object of the transaction (e.g., "5 jars of beer," "10 sheep," "a field (with an area) of 16 bùr," etc.) as well as the person or office involved.

Regarding their "layout," tablets from the Uruk IV period are generally simple, often containing a single entry, but row and column separations also appear. They are rarely written on both sides. In contrast, there are almost no tablets with a single entry by the Uruk III period, during which processes developed to include as much information as possible on a tablet, particularly for writing summary documents. This involves various processes leading to a more complex compartmentalization of the tablets, following a wide variety of modalities. Each of the different entries is isolated in a case, and the cases are organized into rows or columns; some cases are divided in sub-cases so as to add information. The majority of the tablets include more than three of these rows of boxes, and they are often written on both sides. When there are summaries, these are arranged on the reverse, after the individual operations they add up. There are differences between the sites, since the tablets found in Uruk are more complex than those from Jemdet-Nasr. Different types of situations and therefore layouts are observed, depending on the complexity of the administrative document, ranging from basic data processing recording small movements of goods to a synthetic document listing several transactions and ending with totals.

As for the direction of writing and reading, it does not seem to be standardized either. Nissen notes that the orientation of the pictograms would indicate that within the cases the signs are preferentially read vertically, from top to bottom. Each case forms a coherent unit that provides complete information. The whole combines numerical signs and logograms: the numerical signs are written first (at the top), while the logograms can be placed arbitrarily, although the signs representing the things being counted tend to be written just after the numerical signs counting them. Very often, the sequence of writing and reading the aligned boxes is from right to left, and one passes from one row to another from top to bottom. But there is no unity and the arrangements of the boxes and the reading directions are variable. As for the lexical lists, they have a specific layout that is quickly identifiable, notably by their aligned, elongated boxes beginning with the number 1. They have a uniform reading direction, with the passage from one box to the next occurring from right to left and from top to bottom.

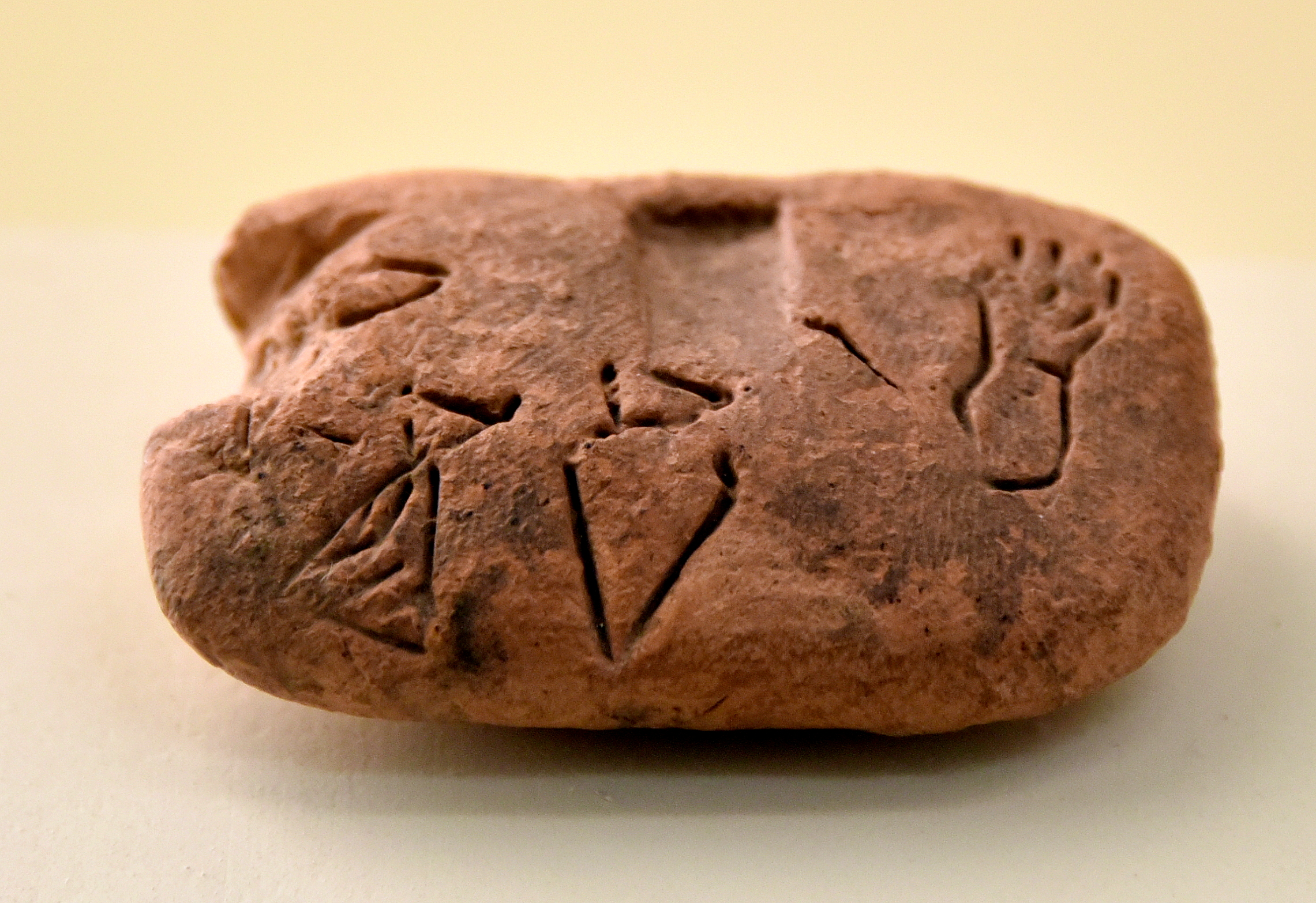
Small administrative tablet without case, Uruk IV, Uruk. Pergamon Museum. The DUG sign for "jar" is visible in the middle.

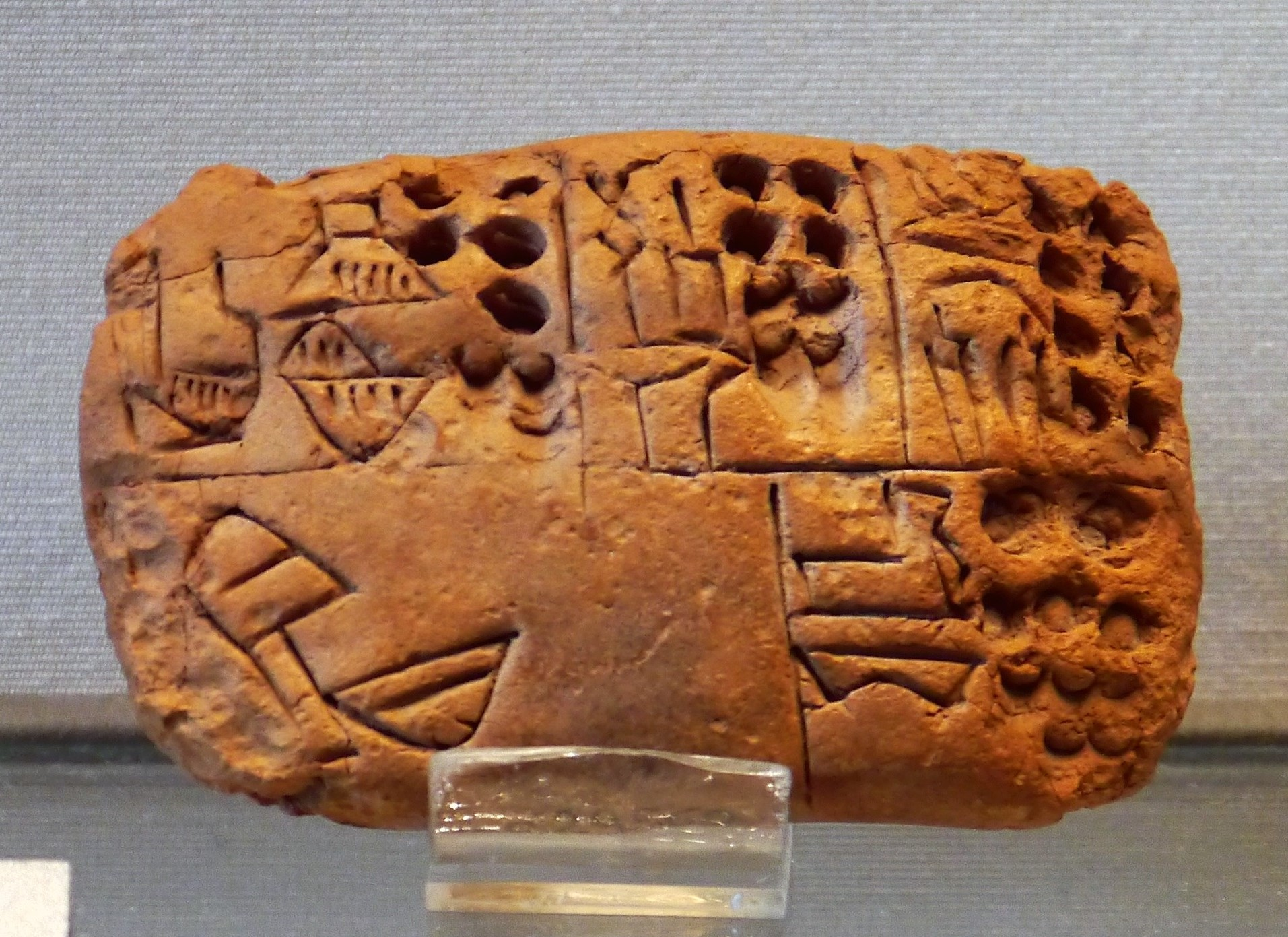
Small administrative tablet, Uruk III phase, recording the distribution of rations, with irregular arrangement of the cases. Louvre Museum.

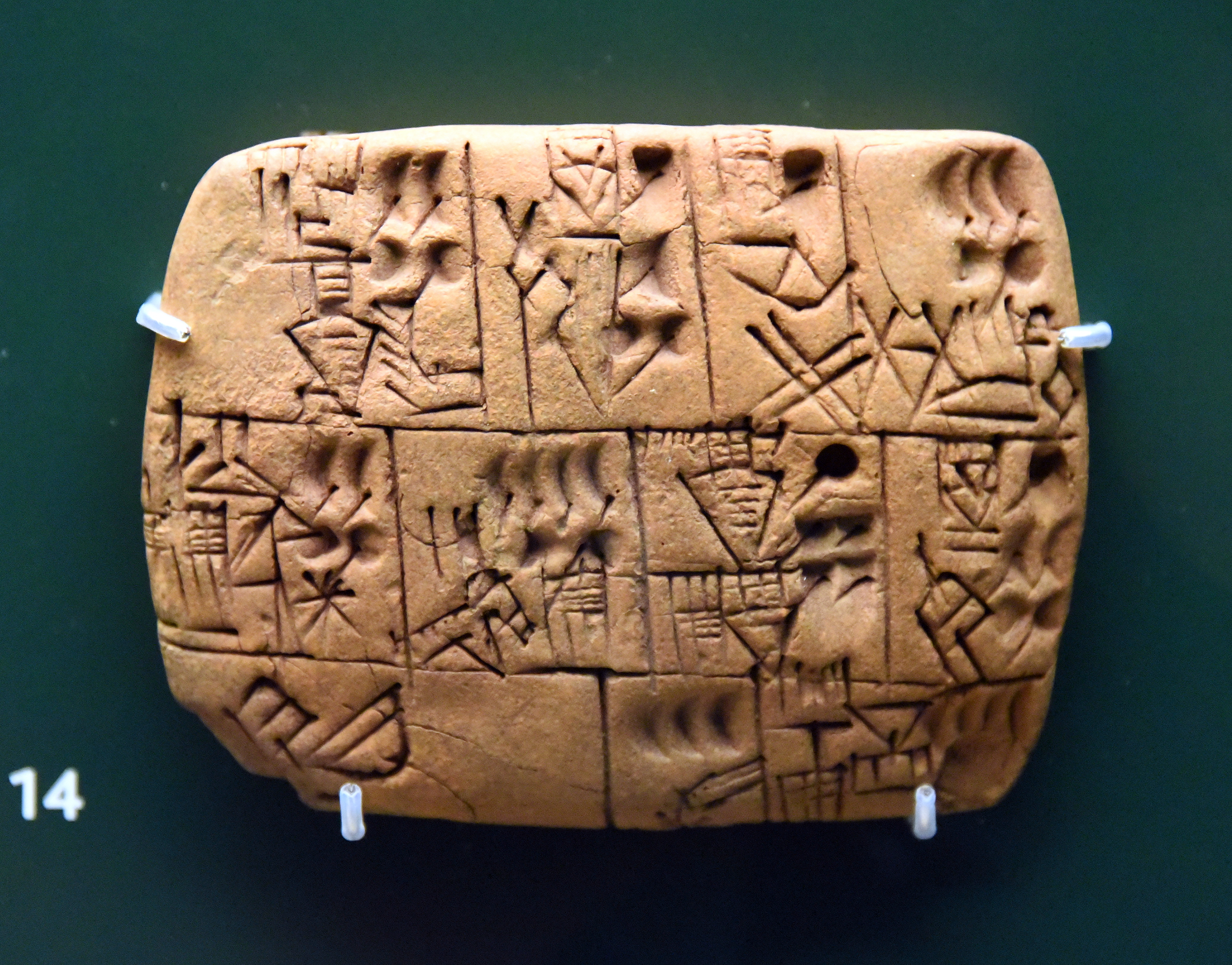
Administrative tablet, Uruk III phase, recording daily rations, with cases arranged in three rows. British Museum.

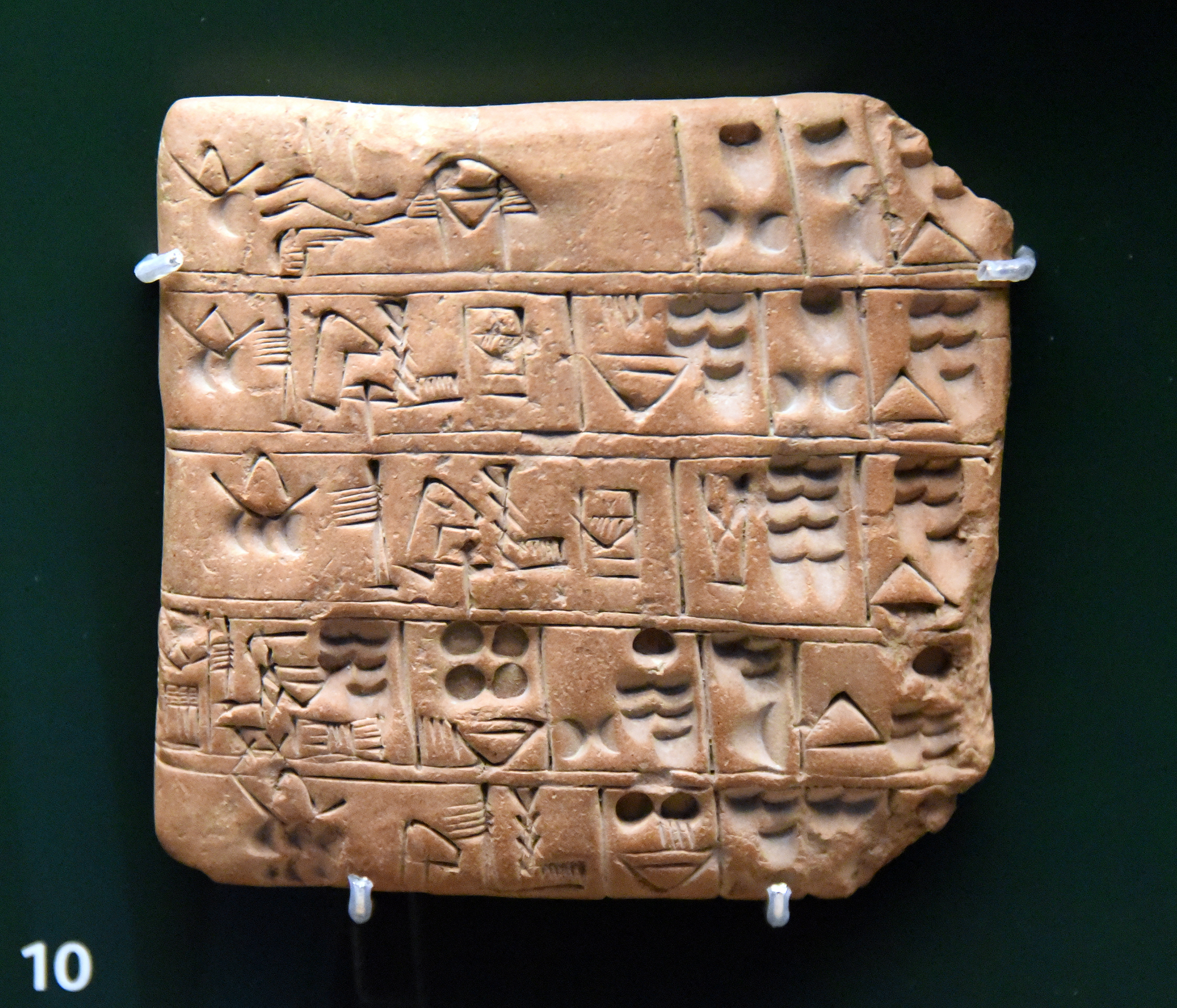
Complex administrative tablet, Uruk III phase, recording rations distributed over five days, each line corresponding to a day (the "day" sign appears on the left with numeric signs), and each case to an operation. The lines are clearly identified by a doubling. British Museum.

In modern publications and museums, the habits of specialists have often led them to display proto-cuneiform tablets in a different orientation from the one in which they were originally read, which explains why the pictograms appear "upside down" (the head sign with the face upwards rather than to the right): to find their original meaning, they must often be rotated 90° clockwise.

== Writing or proto-writing ==
Since the signs inscribed on proto-cuneiform tablets are often arranged randomly and there are no (or almost no) phonetic signs, there is not syntax per se It is not possible to transfer the principles of the cuneiform system to its proto-cuneiform ancestor, because many changes occurred between the two.

The proto-cuneiform documents are certainly more effective instruments for recording information than the precursors of writing such as tokens and numerical tablets, notably because of their ability to report several pieces of information at the same time. However, it is still necessary to have knowledge of their writing context to fully understand their content. The rarity of verbal roots and the absence (with one possible exception) of narrative text in the corpus means that the proto-cuneiform system has often been described as a memory aid (aide-mémoire). A text in this system requires the readers to already know the broad outlines of the information they are going to read. This explains the difficulties encountered in understanding proto-cuneiform texts once these contextual elements have been forgotten.

According to N. Veldhuis:

The archaic (i.e. proto-cuneiform) signs are capable of recording commodities, professional titles, and a variety of metrological systems. The texts do not record administrative events in a narrative fashion but use the layout of the tablet (columns, obverse and reverse) to indicate the relationships among items, totals, and persons involved. In this respect, archaic cuneiform (at least in the more complex accounts) is more like a modern spreadsheet than a modern writing system.

The definition of writing is debated, with two extremes: on the one hand, a view that it is a system of conventional signs for intercommunication between humans, and on the other, a view that only a system seeking to reproduce language and speech, i.e., a spoken sentence, deserves this term. If we stick to the first meaning, proto-cuneiform is without a doubt a form of writing. But if we stick to the other approach, given that the links between proto-cuneiform and language are tenuous at best, this would lead us to question its status as writing strictly speaking, as long as the principle of the rebus, which allows the passage from the sign that indicates a word to the sign that indicates (also) a sound, is not identified with certainty. For this reason, P. Damerow considers proto-cuneiform as a "proto-writing". According to him, writing only came into being later, in the course of the first centuries of the 3rd millennium BC, with the development of phonetic signs in the cuneiform system.

== Publications ==
The proto-cuneiform texts from Uruk were published in a series of books (ATU)

- ATU 1. Adam Falkenstein, "Archaische Texte aus Uruk", Berlin und Leipzig: Deutsche Forschungsgemein-schaft, Kommissionsverlag Otto Harrassowitz, 1936
- ATU 2. M. W. Green und Hans J. Nissen, unter Mitarbeit von Peter Damerow und Robert K. Englund, "Zeichenliste der Archaischen Texte aus Uruk", Berlin, 1987 ISBN 978-3786114390
- ATU 3. Robert K. Englund und Hans J. Nissen unter Mitarbeit von Peter Damerow, "Die Lexikalischen Listen der Archaischen Texte aus Uruk", Berlin, 1993 ISBN 978-3786116875
- ATU 4. Robert K. Englund und Hans J. Nissen, "Katalog der Archaischen Texte aus Uruk"
- ATU 5. Robert K. Englund unter Mitarbeit von R. M. Boehmer, "Archaic Administrative Texts from Uruk: The Early Campaigns", Berlin: Gebr. Mann Verlag, 1994 ISBN 978-3786117452
- ATU 6. Robert K. Englund und Hans J. Nissen unter Mitarbeit von R. M. Boehmer, "Archaische Verwaltungstexte aus Uruk: Vorderasiatisches Museum II", Berlin, 2005 ISBN 978-3786125211
- ATU 7. Robert K. Englund und Hans J. Nissen unter Mitarbeit von R. M. Boehmer, "Archaische Verwaltungstexte aus Uruk: Die Heidelberger Sammlung", Berlin, 2001 ISBN 978-3786124023

And from other sites (MSVO)

- MSVO 1. Robert K. Englund, Jean-Pierre Grégoire, and Roger J. Matthews, "The proto-cuneiform Texts from Jemdet Nasr I: Copies, Transliterations and Glossary", Materialien zu den frühen Schriftzeugnissen des Vorderen Orients Bd. 1. Berlin: Gebr. Mann, 1991 ISBN 9783786116462
- MSVO 2. Matthews, R. J, "Cities, Seals and Writing: Archaic Seal Impressions from Jemdet Nasr and Ur", Berlin: Gebr. Mann, 1993 ISBN 978-3786116868
- MSVO 3. Damerow, P. & Englund, R. K., "The Proto-Cuneiform Texts from the Erlenmeyer Collection" Berlin.
- MSVO 4. Robert K. Englund and Roger J. Matthews, "Proto-Cuneiform Texts from Diverse Collections", Materialien zu den frühen Schriftzeugnissen des Vorderen Orients Bd. 4. Berlin: Gebr. Mann, 1996 ISBN 978-3786118756
- CUSAS 1. Salvatore F. Monaco, "The Cornell University Archaic Tablets (Cornell University Studies in Assyriology and Sumerology)", Eisenbrauns, 2007 ISBN 978-1934309001
- CUSAS 21. Salvatore Monaco, "Archaic Bullae and Tablets in the Cornell University Collections (Cornell University Studies in Assyriology and Sumerology)", 2014 ISBN 978-1-934309-55-1
- CUSAS 31. Salvatore F. Monaco, "Archaic Cuneiform Tablets from Private Collections (Cornell University Studies in Assyriology and Sumerology)", 2016 ISBN 978-1-934309-65-0

== Unicode ==
A Unicode block encoding proto-cuneiform (Uruk III and Uruk IV) was initially proposed in 2020. but has not yet been formally accepted by the consortium, though character encoding for later forms of cuneiform have been formalized. The latest proposal is L2/25-221.

Archaic Cuneiform Numerals^{[1]}^{[2]} Official Unicode Consortium code chart (PDF)
	0	1	2	3	4	5	6	7	8	9	A	B	C	D	E	F
U+1255x	𒕐	𒕑	𒕒	𒕓	𒕔	𒕕	𒕖	𒕗	𒕘	𒕙	𒕚	𒕛	𒕜	𒕝	𒕞	𒕟
U+1256x	𒕠	𒕡	𒕢	𒕣	𒕤	𒕥	𒕦	𒕧	𒕨	𒕩	𒕪	𒕫	𒕬	𒕭	𒕮	𒕯
U+1257x	𒕰	𒕱	𒕲	𒕳	𒕴	𒕵	𒕶	𒕷	𒕸	𒕹	𒕺	𒕻	𒕼	𒕽	𒕾	𒕿
U+1258x	𒖀	𒖁	𒖂	𒖃	𒖄	𒖅	𒖆	𒖇	𒖈	𒖉	𒖊	𒖋	𒖌	𒖍	𒖎	𒖏
U+1259x	𒖐	𒖑	𒖒	𒖓	𒖔	𒖕	𒖖	𒖗	𒖘	𒖙	𒖚	𒖛	𒖜	𒖝	𒖞	𒖟
U+125Ax	𒖠	𒖡	𒖢	𒖣	𒖤	𒖥	𒖦	𒖧	𒖨	𒖩	𒖪	𒖫	𒖬	𒖭	𒖮	𒖯
U+125Bx	𒖰	𒖱	𒖲	𒖳	𒖴	𒖵	𒖶	𒖷	𒖸	𒖹	𒖺	𒖻	𒖼	𒖽	𒖾	𒖿
U+125Cx	𒗀	𒗁	𒗂	𒗃	𒗄	𒗅	𒗆	𒗇	𒗈	𒗉	𒗊	𒗋	𒗌	𒗍	𒗎	𒗏
U+125Dx	𒗐	𒗑	𒗒	𒗓	𒗔	𒗕	𒗖	𒗗	𒗘	𒗙	𒗚	𒗛	𒗜	𒗝	𒗞	𒗟
U+125Ex	𒗠	𒗡	𒗢	𒗣	𒗤	𒗥	𒗦	𒗧	𒗨	𒗩	𒗪	𒗫	𒗬	𒗭	𒗮	𒗯
U+125Fx	𒗰	𒗱	𒗲	𒗳	𒗴	𒗵	𒗶	𒗷	𒗸	𒗹	𒗺	𒗻	𒗼	𒗽	𒗾	𒗿
U+1260x	𒘀	𒘁	𒘂	𒘃	𒘄	𒘅	𒘆	𒘇	𒘈	𒘉	𒘊	𒘋	𒘌	𒘍	𒘎	𒘏
U+1261x	𒘐	𒘑	𒘒	𒘓	𒘔	𒘕	𒘖	𒘗	𒘘	𒘙	𒘚	𒘛	𒘜	𒘝	𒘞	𒘟
U+1262x	𒘠	𒘡	𒘢	𒘣	𒘤	𒘥	𒘦	𒘧	𒘨	𒘩	𒘪	𒘫	𒘬	𒘭	𒘮	𒘯
U+1263x	𒘰	𒘱	𒘲	𒘳	𒘴	𒘵	𒘶	𒘷	𒘸	𒘹	𒘺	𒘻	𒘼	𒘽	𒘾	𒘿
U+1264x	𒙀	𒙁	𒙂	𒙃	𒙄	𒙅	𒙆	𒙇	𒙈	𒙉	𒙊	𒙋	𒙌	𒙍	𒙎	𒙏
U+1265x	𒙐	𒙑	𒙒	𒙓	𒙔	𒙕	𒙖	𒙗	𒙘	𒙙	𒙚	𒙛	𒙜	𒙝	𒙞	𒙟
U+1266x	𒙠	𒙡	𒙢	𒙣	𒙤	𒙥	𒙦	𒙧	𒙨	𒙩	𒙪	𒙫	𒙬	𒙭	𒙮	𒙯
U+1267x	𒙰	𒙱	𒙲	𒙳	𒙴	𒙵	𒙶	𒙷	𒙸	𒙹	𒙺	𒙻	𒙼	𒙽	𒙾	𒙿
U+1268x	𒚀	𒚁	𒚂	𒚃	𒚄	𒚅	𒚆									
Notes 1.As of Unicode version 18.0 2.Grey areas indicate non-assigned code points

== See also ==
- Ancient City Seals
- Babylonian cuneiform numerals
- Kushim (Uruk period)
- Liste der archaischen Keilschriftzeichen
- Proto-Elamite script
