= 3rd millennium BC =

Millennium between 3000 BC to 2001 BC

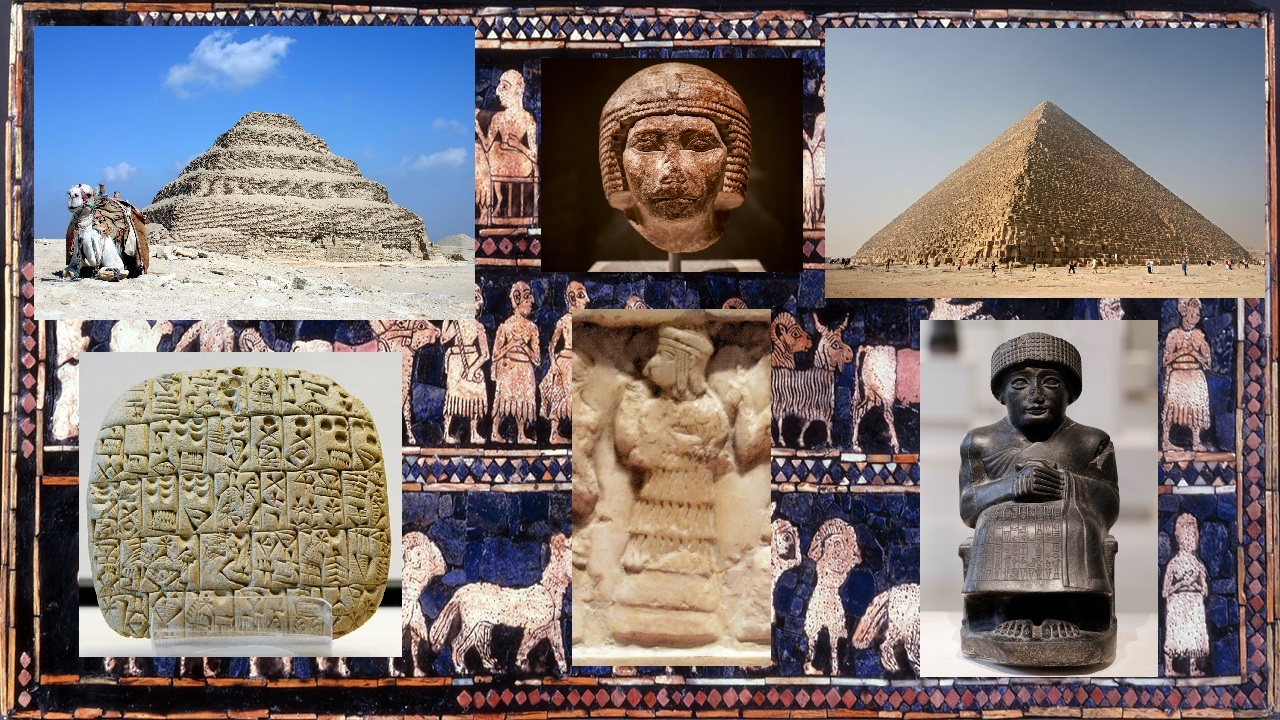
From top left clockwise: Pyramid of Djoser; Khufu; Great Pyramid of Giza, one of the Seven Wonders of the Ancient World; Cuneiform, a contract for the sale of a field and a house; Enheduana, a high priestess and one of the earliest known authors in history; Gudea (Background: Standard of Ur).

The 3rd millennium BC spanned the years 3000 to 2001 BC. This period of time corresponds to the Early to Middle Bronze Age, characterized by the early empires in the Ancient Near East. In Ancient Egypt, the Early Dynastic Period is followed by the Old Kingdom. In Mesopotamia, the Early Dynastic Period is followed by the Akkadian Empire. In what is now Northwest India and Pakistan, the Indus Valley Civilization developed a state society.

World population growth relaxed after the burst due to the Neolithic Revolution. World population was largely stable, at roughly 60 million, with a slow overall growth rate at roughly 0.03% p.a.

== Overview ==
The Bronze Age began in the Ancient Near East roughly between 3000 BC and 2500 BC. The previous millennium had seen the emergence of advanced, urbanized civilizations, new bronze metallurgy extending the productivity of agricultural work, and highly developed ways of communication in the form of writing. In the 3rd millennium BC, the growth of these riches, both intellectually and physically, became a source of contention on a political stage, and rulers sought the accumulation of more wealth and more power. Along with this came the first appearances of monumental architecture, imperialism, organized absolutism and internal revolution.

The civilizations of Sumer and Akkad in Mesopotamia became a collection of volatile city-states in which warfare was common. Uninterrupted conflicts drained all available resources, energies and populations. In this millennium, larger empires succeeded the last, and conquerors grew in stature until the great Sargon of Akkad pushed his empire to the whole of Mesopotamia and beyond. It would not be surpassed in size until Assyrian times 1,500 years later.

In the Old Kingdom of Egypt, the Egyptian pyramids were constructed and would remain the tallest and largest human constructions for thousands of years. Also in Egypt, pharaohs began to posture themselves as living gods made of an essence different from that of other human beings. In Europe, which was still largely Neolithic during the same period, the builders of megaliths were constructing giant monuments of their own. In the Near East and the Occident during the 3rd millennium BC, limits were being pushed by architects and rulers.

Towards the close of the millennium, Egypt became the stage of the first popular revolution recorded in history. After lengthy wars, the Sumerians recognized the benefits of unification into a stable form of national government and became a relatively peaceful, well-organized, complex technocratic state called the 3rd Dynasty of Ur. This dynasty was later to become involved with a wave of nomadic invaders known as the Amorites, who were to play a major role in the region during the following centuries.

== Cultures ==
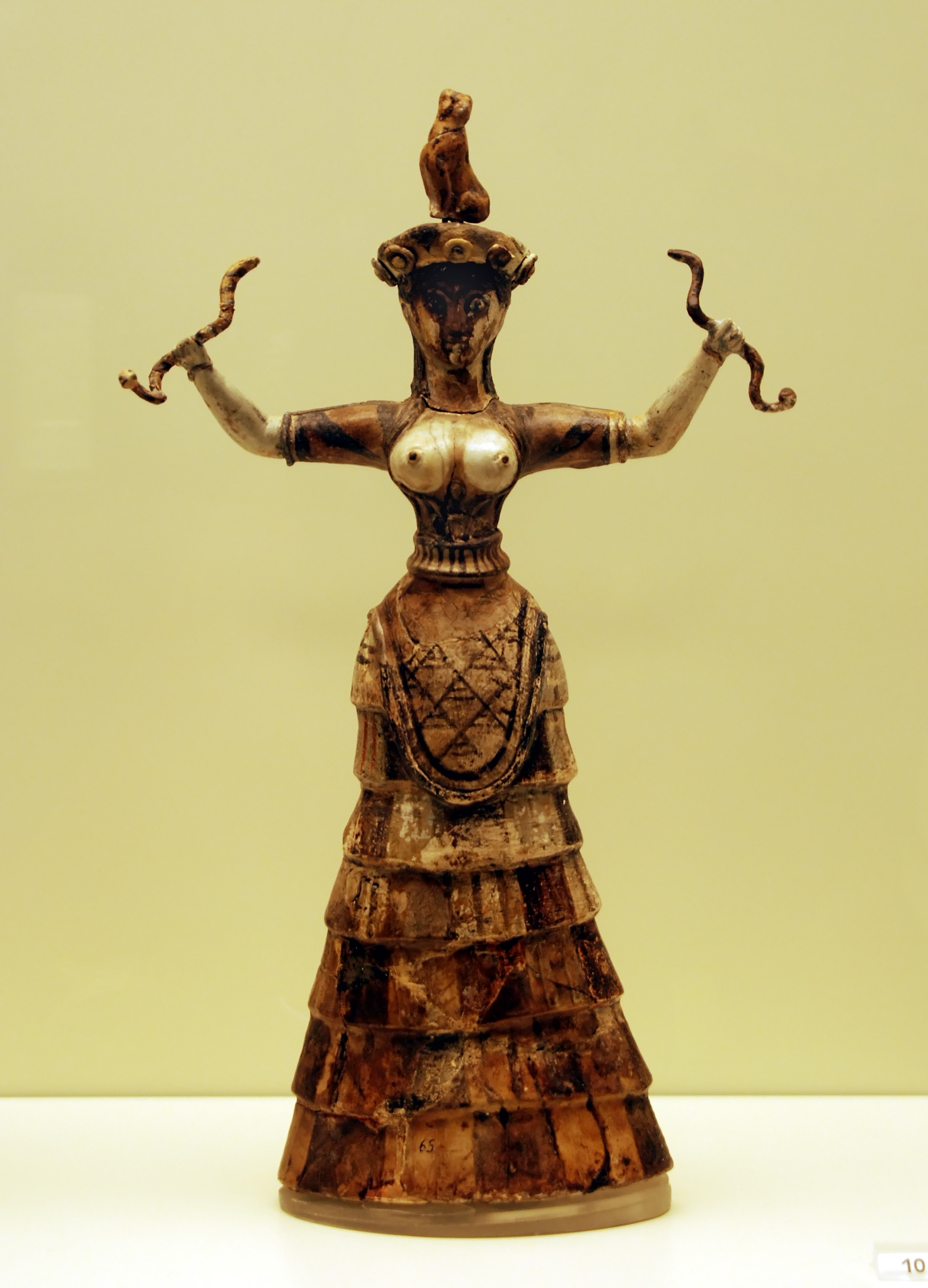
Minoan Snake Goddess.

Near East

- c. 4th millennium BC–5th century BC: Old Dilmun period.
- c. 2900–2350 BC: Early Dynastic Period (Mesopotamia)
- c. 2334–2154 BC: Akkadian Empire
- 3100–2686 BC: Early Dynastic Period (Egypt)
- c. 2700 BC–1600 BC: Old Elamite period.
- 2686–2181 BC Old Kingdom of Egypt
- 2181–2055 BC First Intermediate Period of Egypt
- c. 3000 BC: Nubian A-Group Culture comes to an end.
- c. 2300 BC: Nubian C-Group culture.

Europe

- c. 3200 BC: Cycladic culture in Aegean islands of Greece.
- c. 3200 BC–3100 BC: Helladic culture in mainland Greece.
- c. 3200 BC–2800 BC: Ozieri culture.
- Founding of Europe's oldest civilization, the Minoan Civilization in 3000 BC.
- Corded Ware culture (also Battle-axe culture, or Single Grave culture).
- Late Maikop culture.
- Late Vinca culture.
- Globular Amphora culture.
- Early Beaker culture.
- Yamnaya culture, Catacomb culture, likely loci of Indo-European Satemization.
- The Sintashta-Petrovka-Arkaim culture emerges from the Catacomb culture from about 2200 BC, likely locus of Proto-Indo-Iranian.
- Butmir culture.
- Late Funnelbeaker culture.
- Baden culture.
- Gaudo culture.

South Asia

- 2800 BC–2600 BC: Harappan 2.
- 2600 BC–1900 BC: Harappan 3 (Mature Harappan).

East and Southeast Asia

- Longshan culture
- Baodun culture
- Shijiahe culture
- Liangzhu culture
- Majiayao culture
- Lower Xiajiadian culture
- c. 2500 BC: Austronesian peoples from Formosa colonize Luzon in northern Philippines.

Americas

- Mesoamerican Archaic period
- Old Copper Complex
- Caral/Norte Chico civilization.

Sub-Saharan Africa

- Savanna Pastoral Neolithic

== Events ==
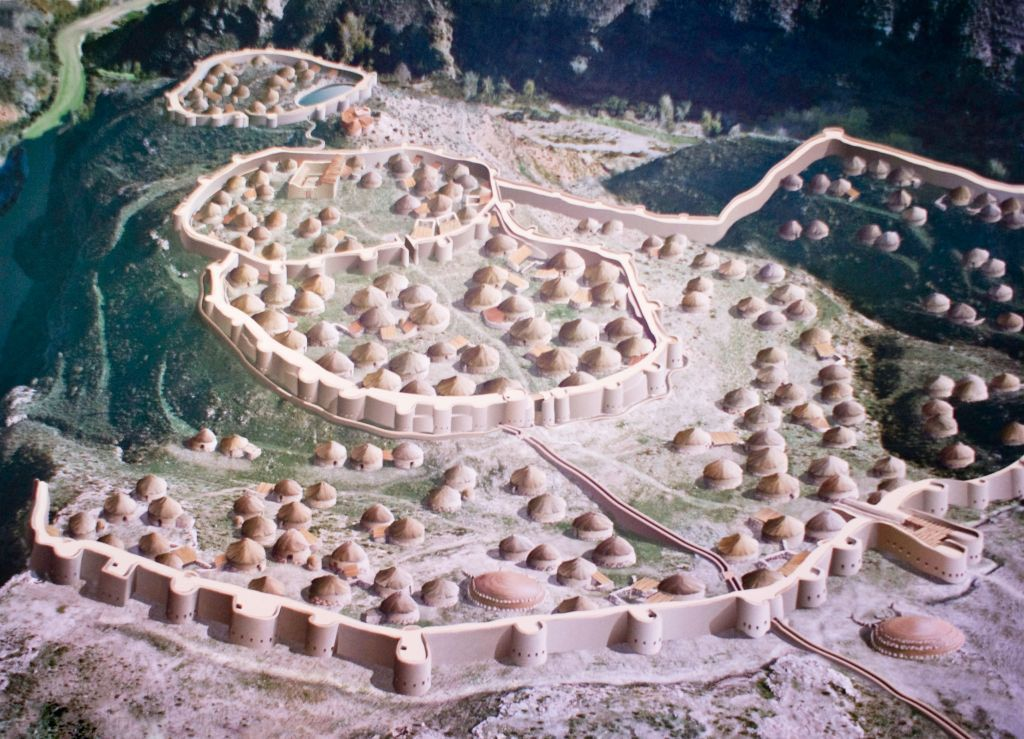
A model of the prehistoric town of Los Millares, with its walls.

Certain 4th millennium BC events were precursors to the 3rd millennium BC:

- c. 3700-1800 BC: Caral-Supe flourished between the fourth and second millennia BC, with the formation of the first city generally dated to around 3500 BC, at Huaricanga, in the Fortaleza area. It is from 3100 BC onward that large-scale human settlement and communal construction become clearly apparent, which lasted until a period of decline around 1800 BC.
- c. 3500 BC-3000 BC Huaricanga is the earliest city of the Norte Chico civilization, called Caral or Caral-Supe in Peru and Spanish language sources. "It existed around 3500 BC and was the oldest city in the Americas and one of the earliest cities in the world." It is located in the arid Fortaleza Valley on Peru's north central coast and is 14 mi (23 km) inland from the Pacific Ocean. The site covers a total area of 100 hectares, and is the largest Late Archaic construction in the Norte Chico region. The three earthwork mounds on the large site are believed to be remains of pyramidal-shaped structures. Two standing stones, known as huancas, also survive. Excavation in 2007 revealed a structure believed to be a temple, of a design similar to, but predating, the Mito architectural tradition seen in the Peruvian highlands. In addition, later research in the Fortaleza and Pativilca valleys has found evidence of maize cultivation, as well as fourteen other domesticated species of fruits and vegetables. This suggests that agriculture may have been more important to the development of Caral-Supe civilization than previously thought, as it was for other independent civilizations of the world, such as Mesopotamia, Egypt, China, and India.
- c. 3700 BC: Lothal: Indus Valley trade-port city in India.
- c. 3650 BC–3000 BC: Minoan culture appeared on Crete.
- c. 3200 BC/3100 BC: Helladic culture and Cycladic culture both emerge in Greece.

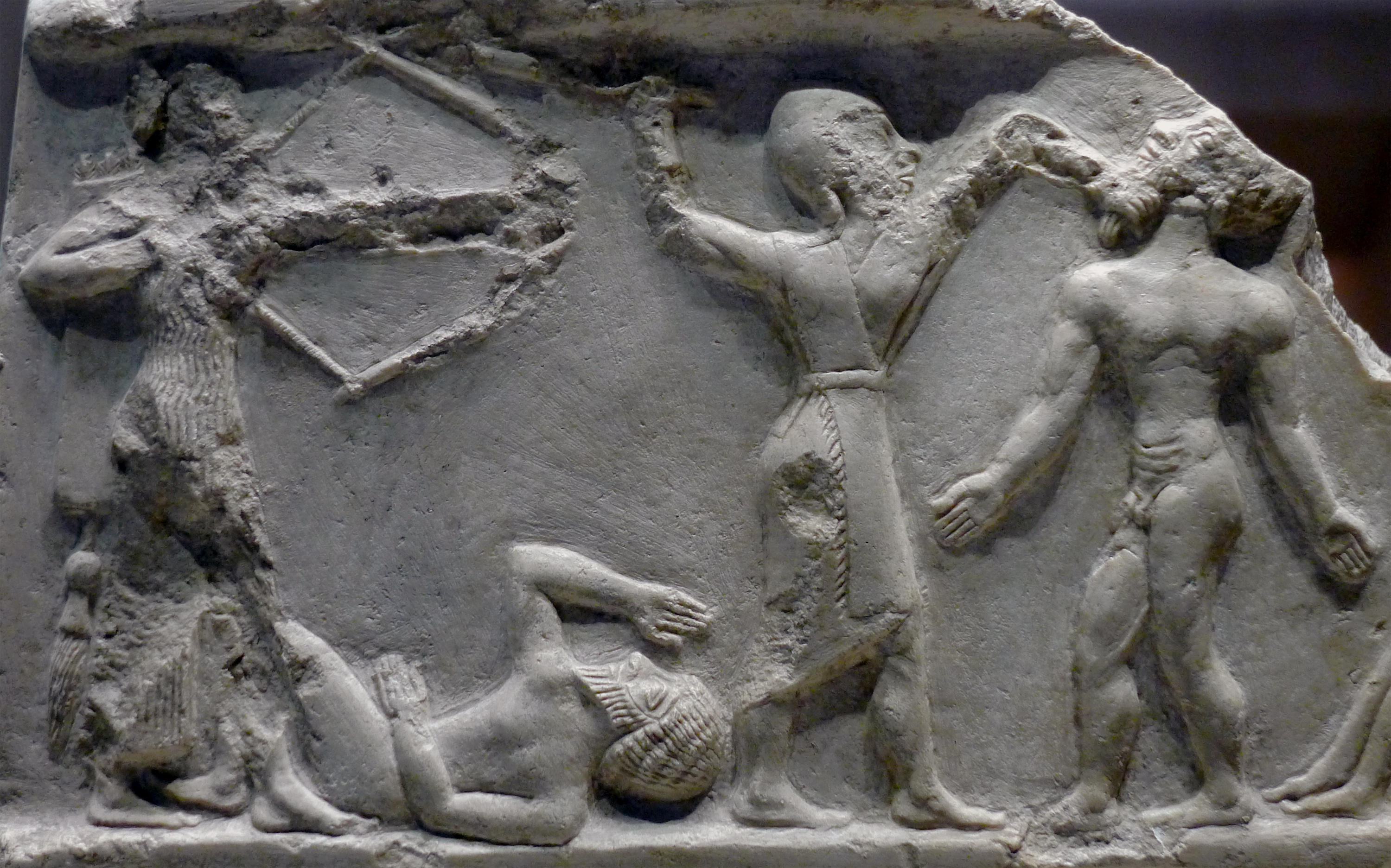
Detail of a victory stele of Akkadian king Rimush

The 3rd millennium BC included the following key events:

- c. 3000 BC: Unification of Upper and Lower Egypt.
- c. 3000 BC: First evidence of gold being used in the Middle East.
- c. 3000 BC: Nubian A-Group, Ta-Seeti "kingdom" came to an end, possibly due to raids by Egypt.
- c. 3000 BC–2000 BC: Vessels from Denmark are made; they are now at National Museum, Copenhagen.
- c. 2890 BC: Second Dynasty of Egypt, reign of Hotepsekhemwy.
- Syria: Foundation of the city of Mari (29th century BC).
- Semitic tribes occupy Assyria in northern part of the plain of Shinar and Akkad.
- Phoenicians settle on Syrian coast, with centers at Tyre and Sidon.
- Beginning of the period of the mythical Sage Kings in China, also known as the Three Sovereigns and Five Emperors.
- c. 2879 BC: Rise of the Xích Quỷ Kingdom and the Hồng Bàng dynasty in northern Viet Nam and southern China.

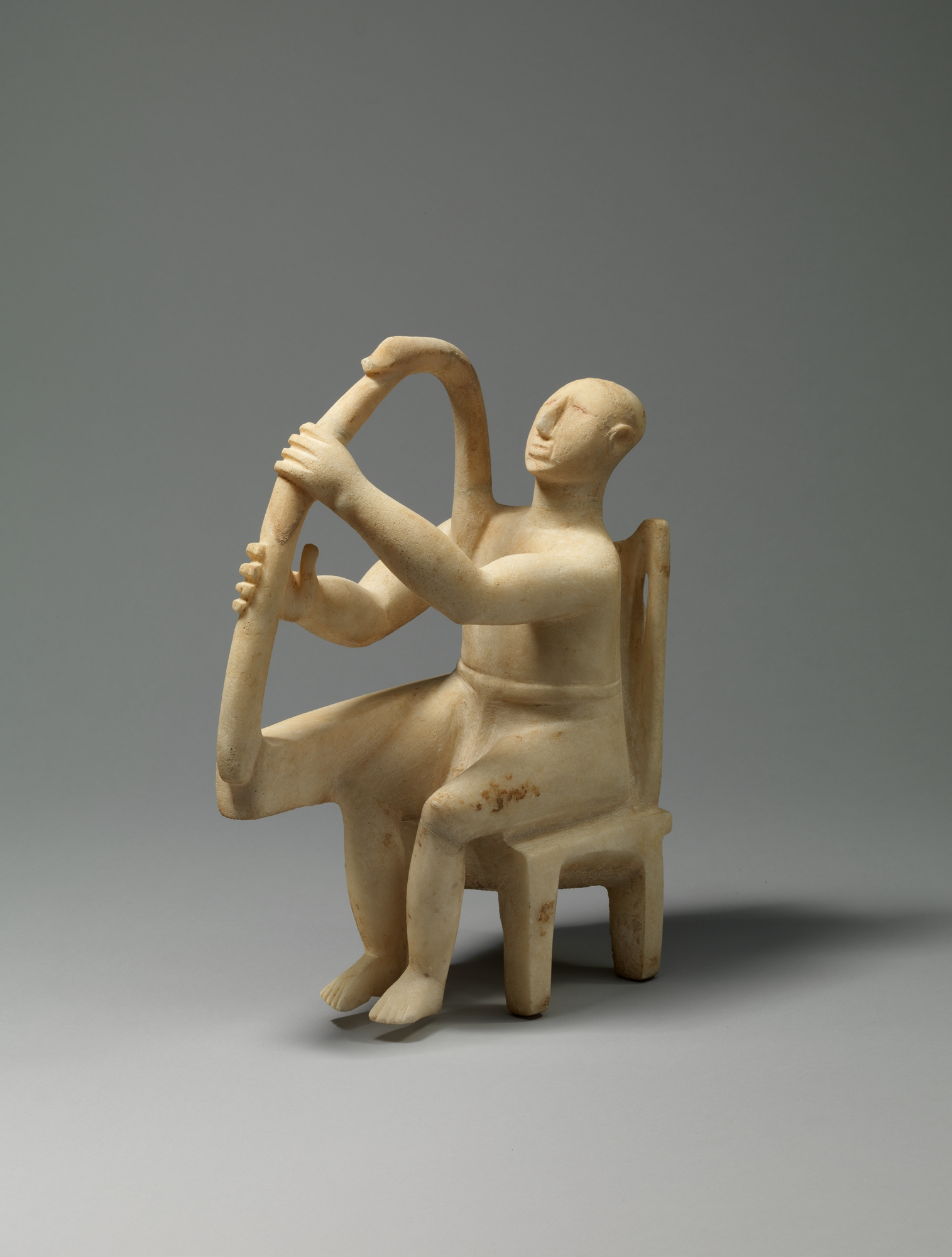
Harp Player from the island of Keros, made by the Cycladic culture sometime in the 28th century BC.

- c. 2800 BC–2700 BC: Harp Player, from Keros, Cyclades, was made. It is now at the Metropolitan Museum of Art, New York.
- Iran: Creation of the Kingdom of Elam.
- Germination of the Bristlecone pine tree "Methuselah" about 2700 BC, one of the oldest known trees still living now.
- c. 2686 BC: Third Dynasty of Egypt, reign of Sanakhte.
- c. 2613 BC: Fourth Dynasty of Egypt, reign of Sneferu.
- c. 2600 BC: Founding of the Chalcolithic Iberian civilizations of Los Millares and Zambujal.
- 2600 BC: Unified Indus Valley Civilisation.
- c. 2500 BC: The state of Assyria is established.
- c. 2500 BC: Excavation and development of the Hypogeum of Ħal-Saflieni at Paola, Malta, a subterranean temple complex subsequently used as a necropolis.
- c. 2500 BC–2200 BC: Incised panel "Frying pan", from Syros, Cyclades is made; it is now at the National Archaeological Museum, Athens.
- c. 2500 BC–2200 BC: Two figures of women, from the Cyclades, are made; they are now at Museum of Cycladic Art, Athens.
- Dynasty of Lagash in Sumer.
- 2474 BC–2398 BC: Golden age of Ur in Mesopotamia.
- c. 2498 BC: Fifth Dynasty of Egypt, reign of Userkaf.
- c. 2492 BC: The Armenian patriarch Hayk defeats the Babylonian king Bel (legendary account).
- c. 2345 BC: Sixth Dynasty of Egypt, reign of Teti.
- 2334 BC: Sargon of Akkad conquers Mesopotamia, establishing the Akkadian Empire.
- c. 2300 BC: C-Group pastoralists arrive in Nubia.
- c. 2181 BC: Seventh and Eighth Dynasty of Egypt (2181–2160).
- c. 2160 BC: Ninth Dynasty of Egypt, reign of Akhtoy Meryibtowe.
- c. 2130 BC: Tenth Dynasty of Egypt, reign of Meryhathor.
- c. 2134 BC: Eleventh Dynasty of Egypt, reign of Mentuhotep I.
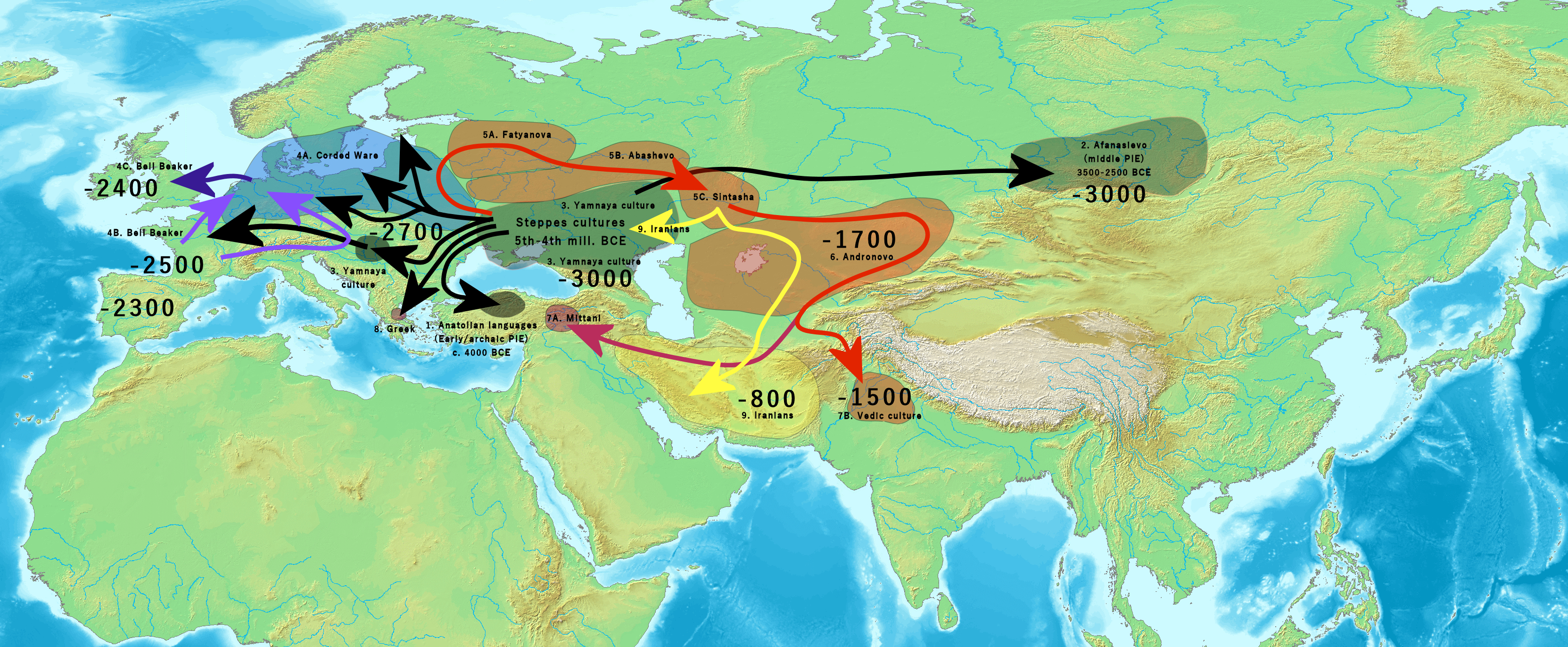
  Early Indo-European migrations from the Pontic steppes and across Central Asia
- Megalithic, Corded Ware culture and the Beaker flourish in Europe.
- Sumerian poetry, lamenting the death of Tammuz, the shepherd god.
- Sumerian cuneiform writing (reduces pictographs still in use to about 550 BC).
- Major religious festival in Sumeria celebrates victory of god of spring over goddess of chaos.
- Earliest Trojan culture.
- Glass beads in Egypt.
- The world's last surviving mammoth population, on Wrangel Island in the Arctic Ocean, goes extinct, sometime between 2500 and 2000 BC.
- c. 2070 BC–1600 BC: The first dynasty in traditional Chinese historiography--Xia dynasty begins in China.

== Inventions, discoveries, introductions ==
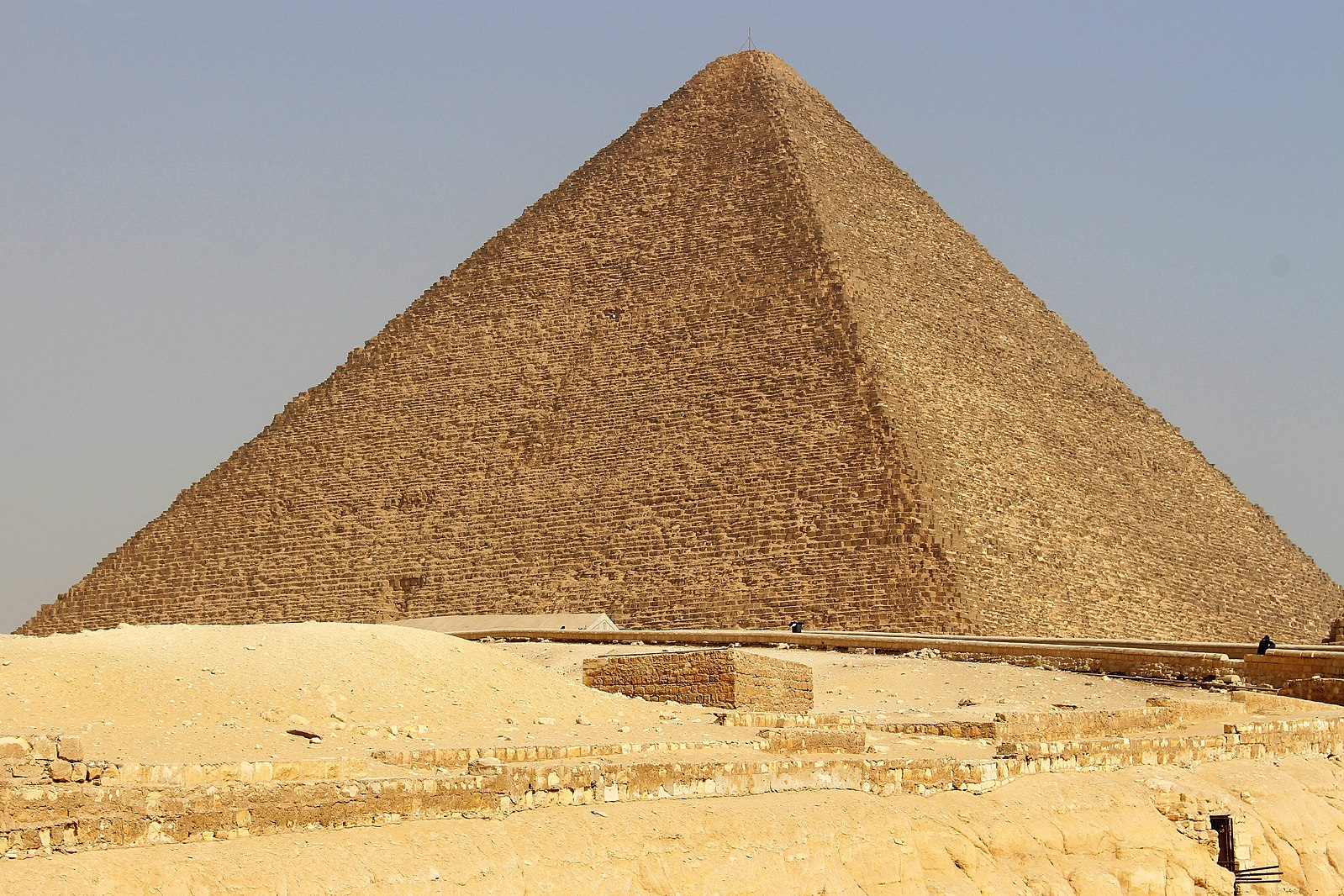
Great Pyramid of Giza, Kheops.

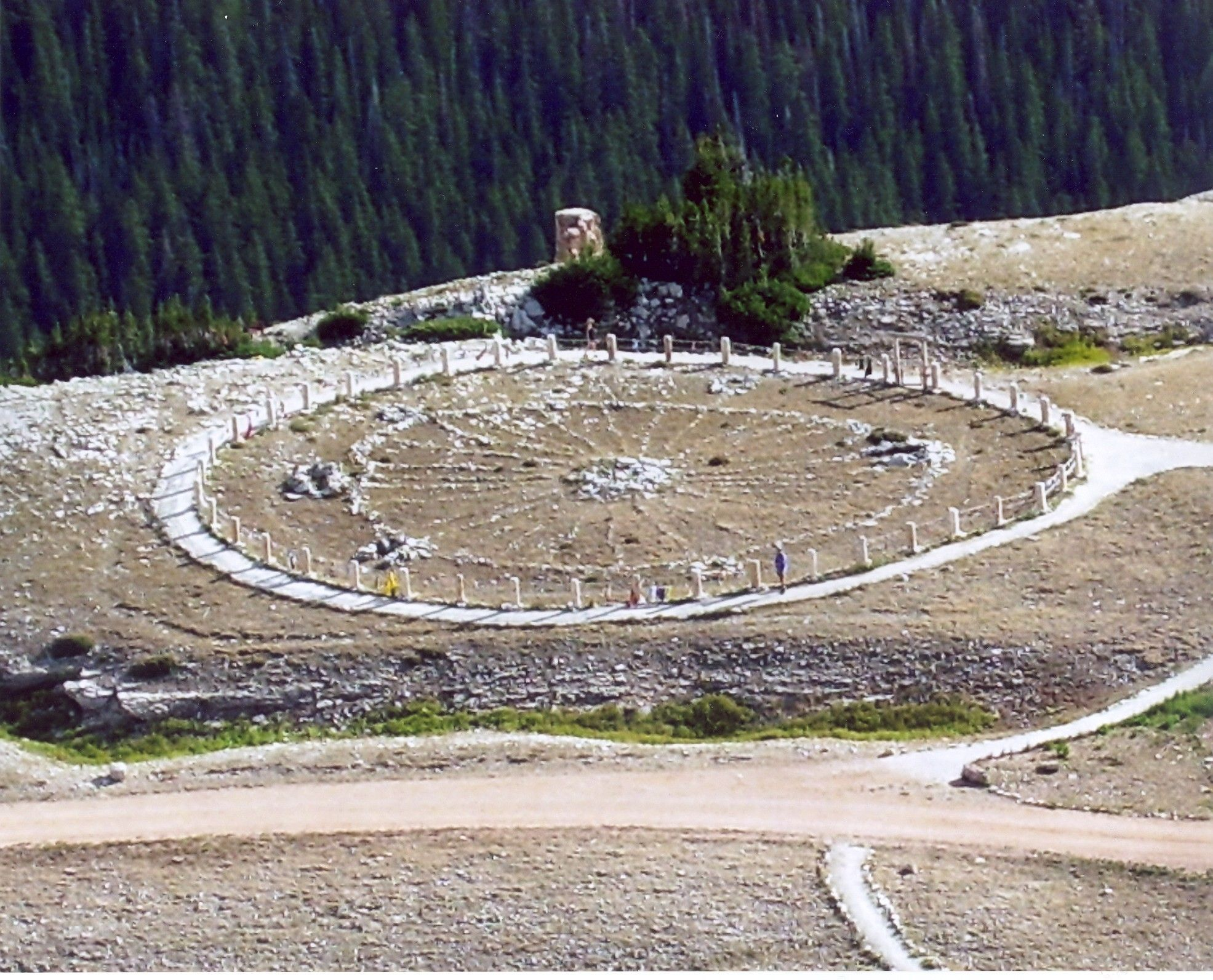
The Medicine Wheel in Bighorn National Forest, Wyoming, United States.

- The oldest documented evidence of the practice of meditation are wall arts in the Mohenjodaro and Harappa.
- Stepwell: Earliest clear evidence of the origins of the stepwell is found in the Indus Valley Civilisation's archaeological site at Mohenjodaro in Pakistan.
- Toilet platforms above drains, in the proximity of wells, are found in several houses of the cities of Mohenjodaro and Harappa.
- Pottery develops in Americas (30th century BC).
- c. 3000 BC: Potter's wheel appears in Mesopotamia.
- 2900 BC–2400 BC: Sumerians invent phonogram (linguistics).
- 2650 BC: Reservoirs, script, metals and pottery used in the city of Dholavira in Indus Valley Civilization.
- c. 2300 BC: Metals are used in Northern Europe.
- Chinese record a comet.
- Building of the Great Pyramid of Giza (26th century BC).
- Sails used on ships (20th century BC).
- First ziggurats built in Sumer.
- Near East civilizations enter Bronze Age around 3000 BC.
- Oldest known medicine wheel constructed in the Americas.
- First Copper (~2500 BC) and then Bronze (~2000 BC) and other types of metallurgy are introduced to Ireland.
- The kunga was first bred in Ancient Syria and Mesopotamia by hybridizing captured now-extinct Syrian wild ass males with domestic donkey females between 2600 and 2000 BCE. It later fell out of favor when both domestic horses and their donkey hybrids, mules, arrived in the ancient Near East at the end of the millennium.
- Domestication of the horse with the coming of Indo-Europeans in central Eurasia.
- The chariot emerges in Eurasian Steppe just before 2000 BC.
- The camel (dromedary) domesticated (though widespread use took until mid-to-late 2nd millennium BC).
- Indoor plumbing and sewage in the Indus Valley Civilization.
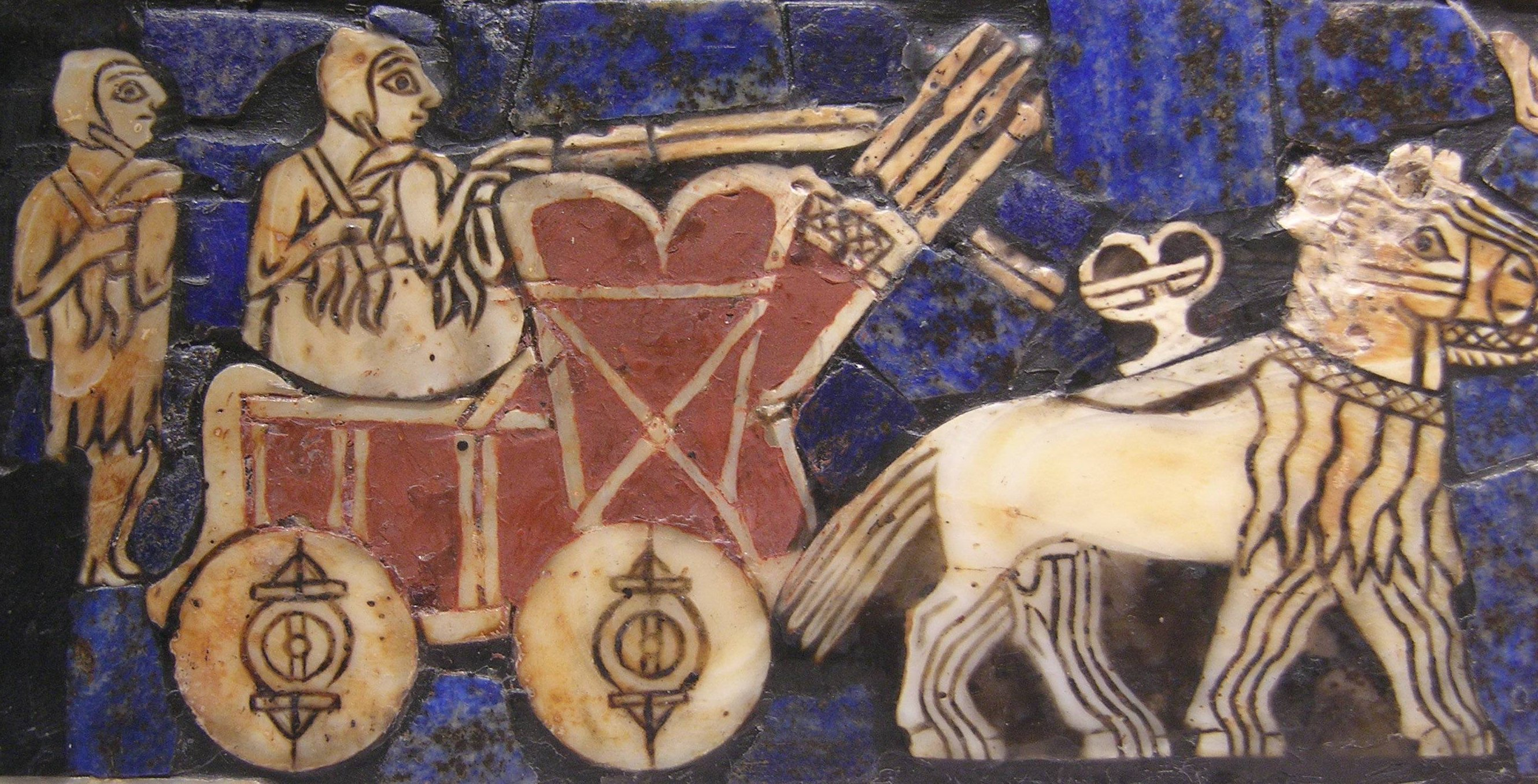
  Chariot depicted on the Standard of Ur, from the Sumerian city-state of Ur, c. 2600 BC
- Sumerian medicine discovers the healing qualities of mineral springs.
- Weaving loom known in Europe.
- Ornamental buttons—made from seashell—were used in the Indus Valley civilisation for ornamental purposes by 2000 BCE.
- Sumerian numerical system based on multiples of 6 and 12.
- Egyptians begin use of papyrus.
- Austronesian peoples have developed lateen sail, and the out-rigger as well as extensive development of celestial navigation systems.
- Oldest known evidence of the inhalation of cannabis smoke, as indicated by charred cannabis seeds found in a ritual brazier at a burial site in present-day Romania.

== Cultural landmarks ==
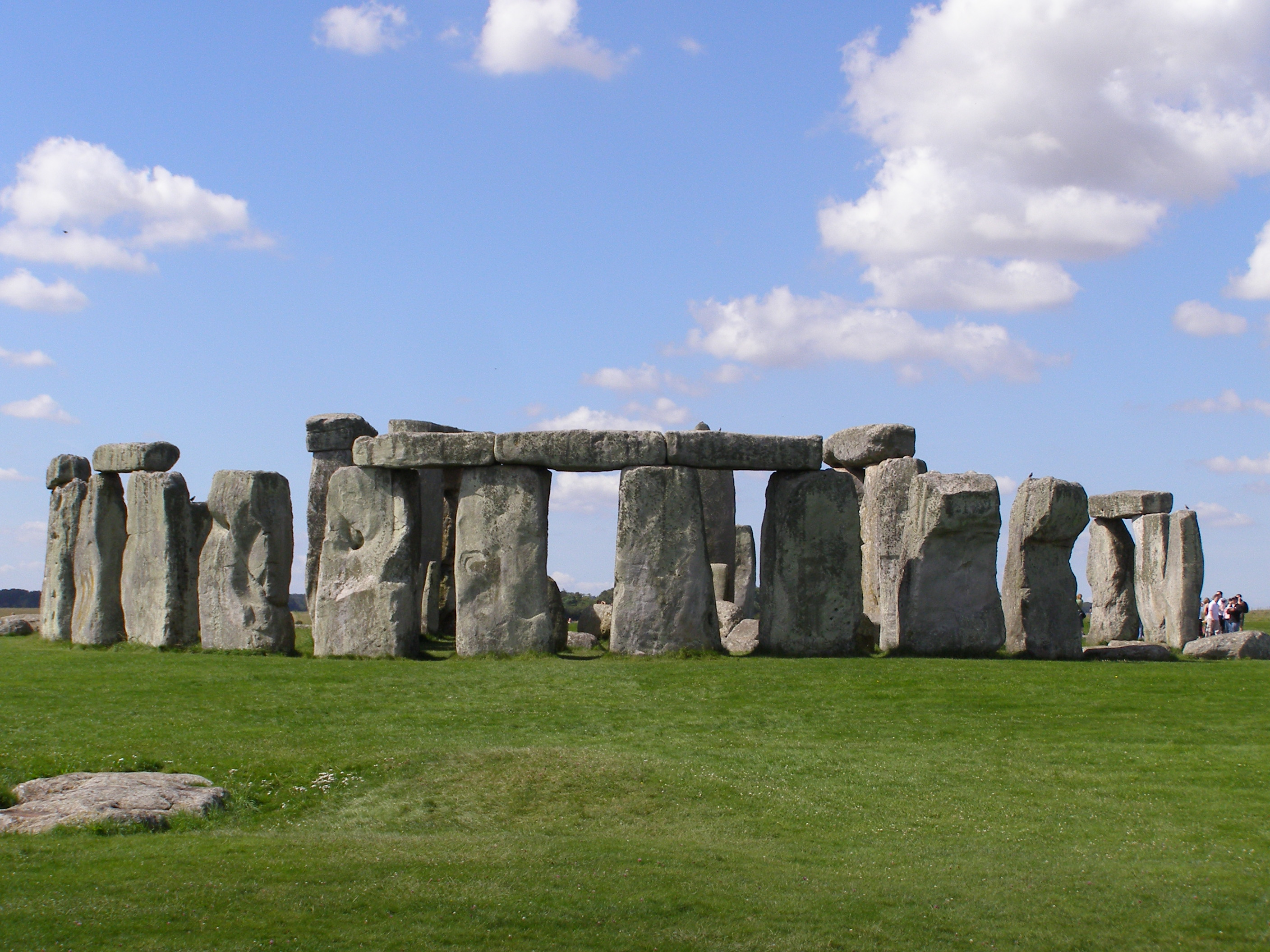
Stonehenge.

- c. 3000 BC–2500 BC: Tomb, Newgrange, Ireland, was built.
- c. 2750 BC–1500 BC: Stonehenge, Salisbury Plain, Wiltshire, England, is built.
- c. 2700 BC–2400 BC: World's oldest shipwreck located near Kekova island, Turkey.
- Completion of the Great Pyramid of Giza.
- Completion of first phase of Stonehenge monument in England.
- Era of Buena Vista pyramid/observatory in Peru.
- The Sydney rock engravings in Sydney, Australia, which are examples of Aboriginal rock art, date from around 3000 BC.

== Centuries ==
- 30th century BC
- 29th century BC
- 28th century BC
- 27th century BC
- 26th century BC
- 25th century BC
- 24th century BC
- 23rd century BC
- 22nd century BC
- 21st century BC
