= 4th millennium BC =

Millennium between 4000 BC and 3001 BC

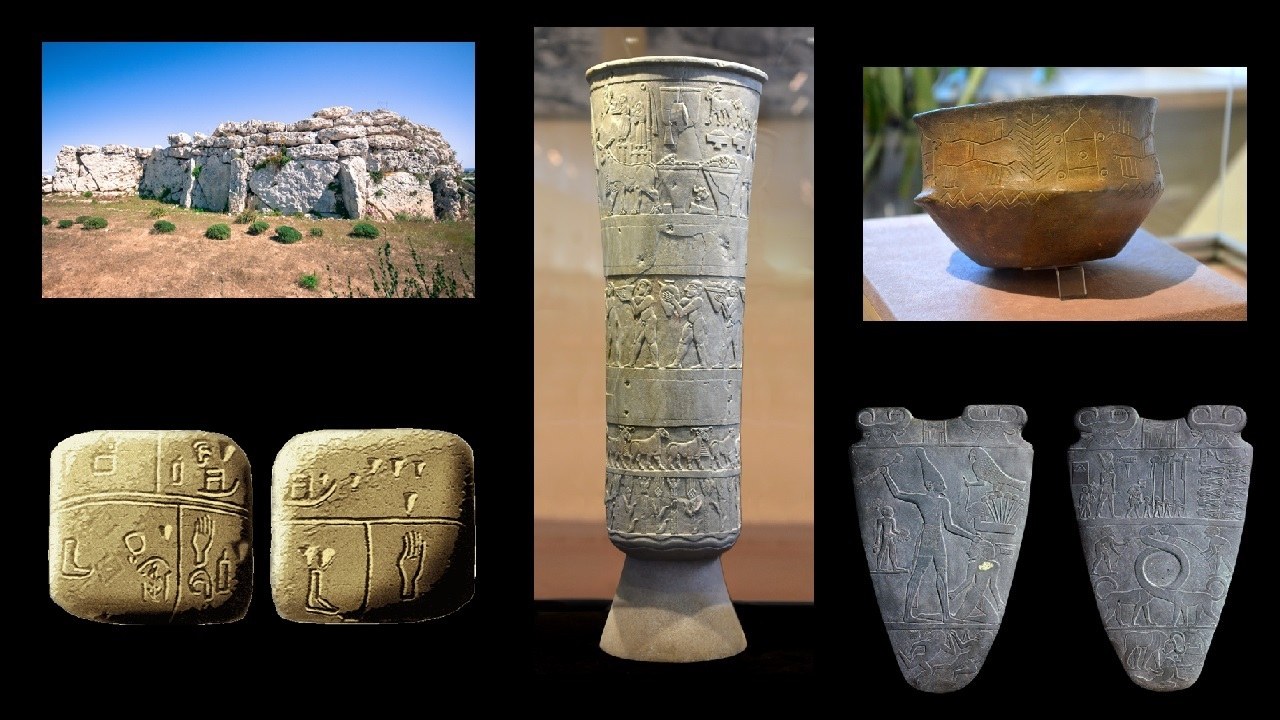
From top left clockwise: The Temple of Ġgantija, one of the oldest freestanding structures in the world; Warka Vase; Bronocice pot with one of the earliest known depictions of a wheeled vehicle; Kish tablet, an example for proto-writing; Pharaoh Narmer is credited with uniting Upper and Lower Egypt and is depicted as such in the Narmer Palette.

The 4th millennium BC spanned the years 4000 BC to 3001 BC. It marked a critical turning point in human history, characterized by the transition from late Neolithic agricultural societies into urban, state-level civilizations.

This millennium witnessed the invention of writing, the initial spread of bronze metallurgy, the adoption of the wheeled vehicle, and the rise of the first primary states in Mesopotamia and Ancient Egypt, effectively initiating recorded history.

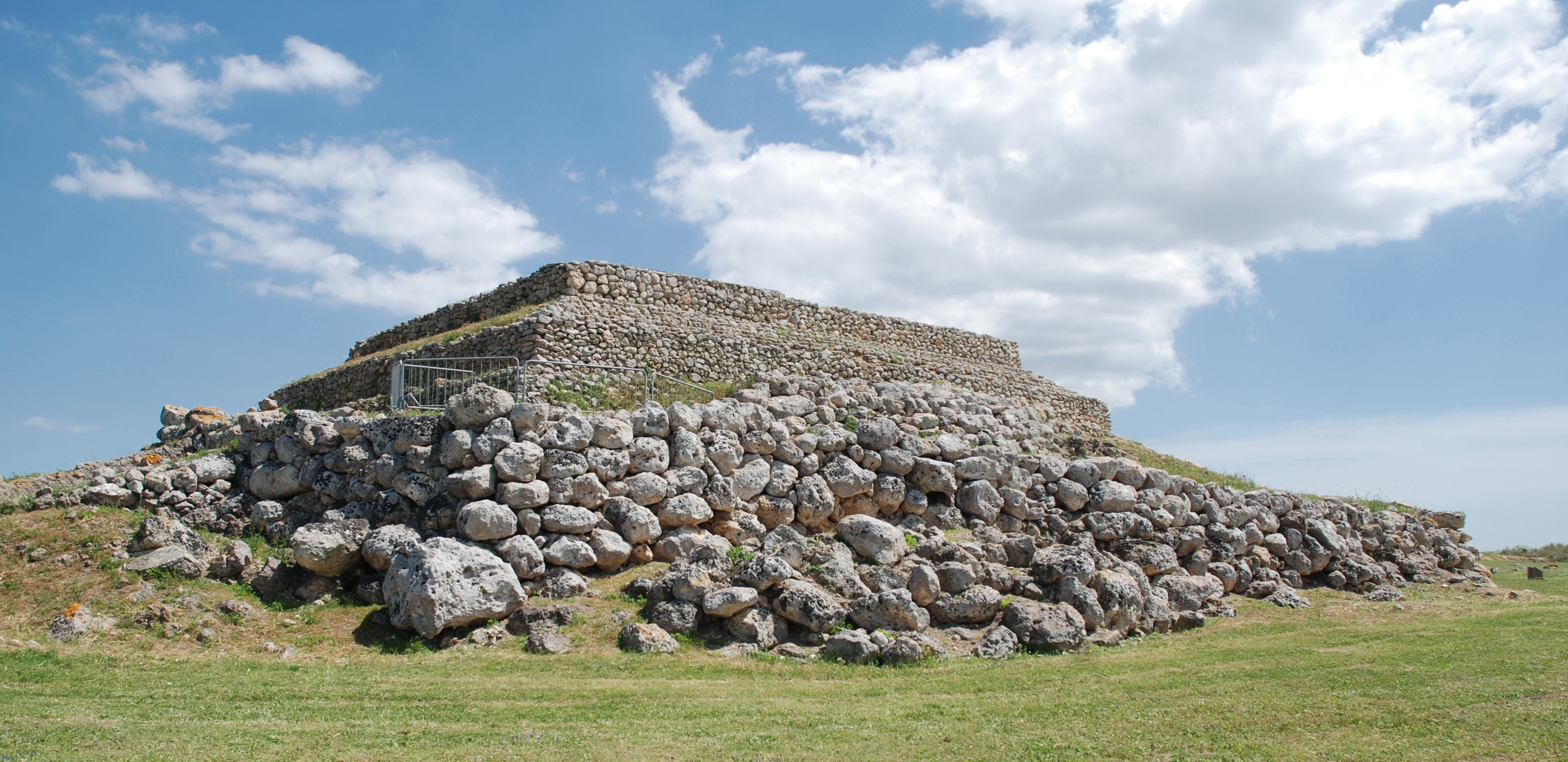
Monte d'Accoddi is an archaeological site in northern Sardinia, Italy, located in the territory of Sassari near Porto Torres. 4th millennium BC.

The city states of Sumer and the (Predynastic) Kingdom of Egypt were established and grew to prominence. Agriculture spread widely across Eurasia.

World population growth relaxed after the burst that came about from the Neolithic Revolution. World population was largely stable in this time at roughly 50 million, growing at an average of 0.027% per year.

== Culture ==
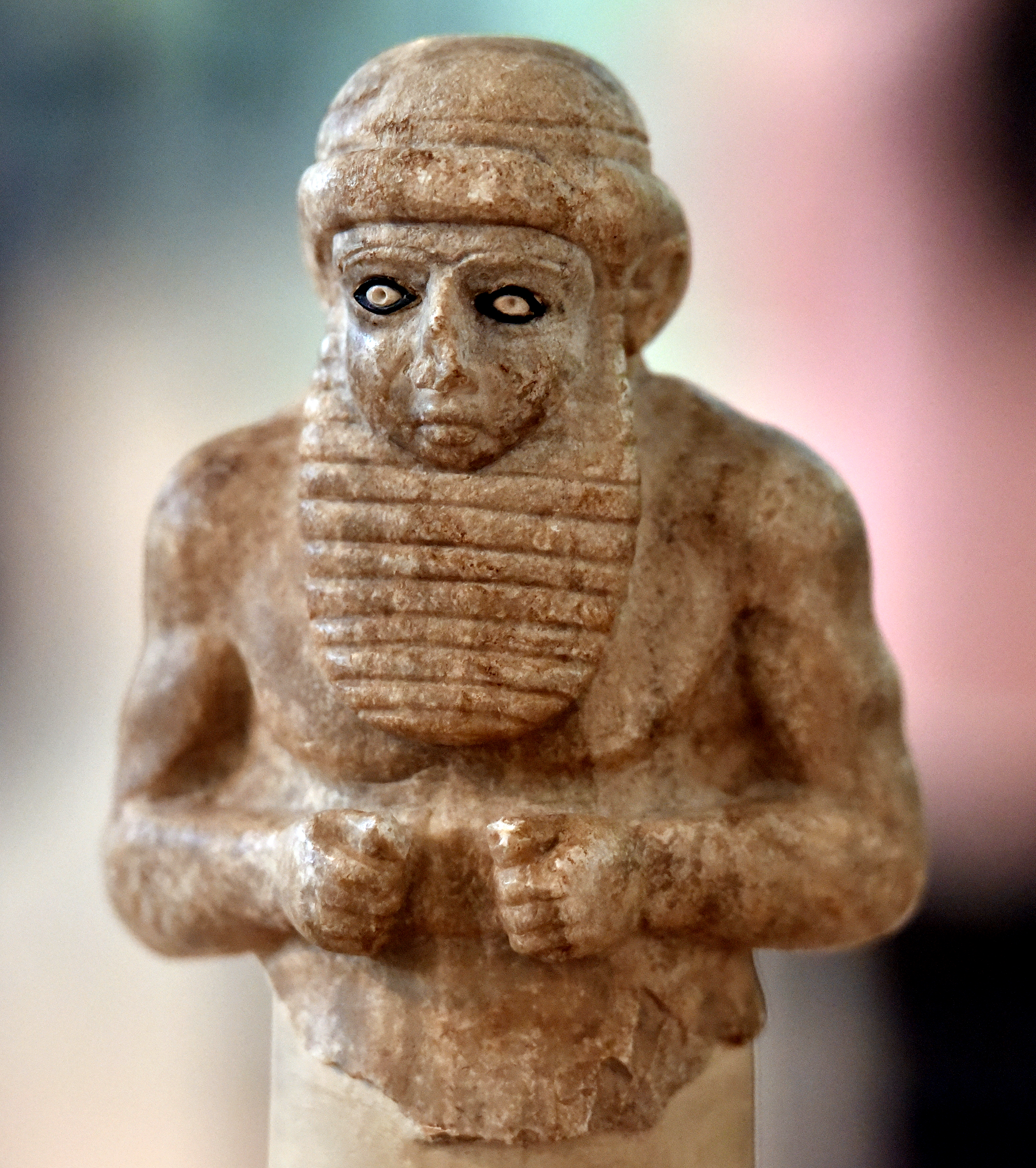
Sumerian priest-king from Uruk, Mesopotamia, circa 3300–3000 BC

Near East

- c. 3250 BC – Potter's wheel in use in Ancient Near East
- Mesopotamia
  - 4100–3100 BC – the Uruk period, with emerging Sumerian hegemony during the Uruk Expansion and development of Proto-cuneiform writing; base-60 mathematics, astronomy and astrology, civil law, complex hydrology, the sailboat, potter's wheel and wheel; the Chalcolithic proceeds into the Early Bronze Age. Dams, canals, stone sculptures using inclined plane and lever in Sumer and the Tigris–Euphrates Valley
  - c. 3100 BC?: The Anu Ziggurat and White Temple are built in Uruk.
  - 3500–2340 BC – Sumer: wheeled carts, potter's wheel, White Temple ziggurat, bronze tools and weapons.
  - First to Fourth dynasty of Kish in Mesopotamia.
  - Sumerian temple of Inanna at Eridu erected.
  - Temple at Al-Ubaid and tomb of Mes-Kalam-Dug built near Ur, Chaldea.
  - c. 3700 BC In the city of Uruk, groups of tokens representing commercial transactions begin to be enclosed in hollow clay balls and kept in archives.
  - 3300 BC to 3000 BC: Face of a woman, from Uruk (modern Warka, Iraq) is made; it is now in the Iraq Museum, Baghdad (stolen and recovered in 2003)
  - Ubaid period came to an abrupt end in eastern Arabia and the Oman peninsula at 3800 BC.
  - 3000 BC – Tin is in use in Mesopotamia soon after this time.
  - The cuneiform script proper emerges from pictographic proto-writing in the later 4th millennium. Mesopotamia's "proto-literate" period spans the 35th to 32nd centuries BC. The first documents unequivocally written in the Sumerian language date to the 31st century BC, found at Jemdet Nasr.
  - Kish tablet
  - Kura-Araxes culture expands Southwards towards Sumer.
  - Possible reigns of Lugalbanda and Enmerkar prior to 3250 BC.
  - Long distanced trade with polities in modern-day Afghanistan.
  - Dams, canals, stone sculptures using inclined plane and lever in Sumer.
  - Urkesh (northern Syria) founded during the fourth millennium BC possibly by the Hurrians.
  - The Courtyard is introduced to Mesopotamia.
- Persian plateau
  - 4000 BC – Susa is a center of pottery production.
  - c. 4000 BC – Beaker from Susa (modern Shush, Iran) is made. It is now at Musée du Louvre, Paris.
  - Proto-Elamite from 3200 BC.
  - In Syria, mass graves at Tell Brak, dating from c. 3800 to 3600 BC, have been unearthed, suggesting advanced warfare around this period.
  - c. 3750 BC – Disintegration of the Proto-Semitic language
- Anatolia and Caucasus
  - c. 3700 BC to 3000 BC – The Maykop culture of the Caucasus, contemporary to the Kurgan culture, is a candidate for the origin of Bronze production and thus the Bronze Age.

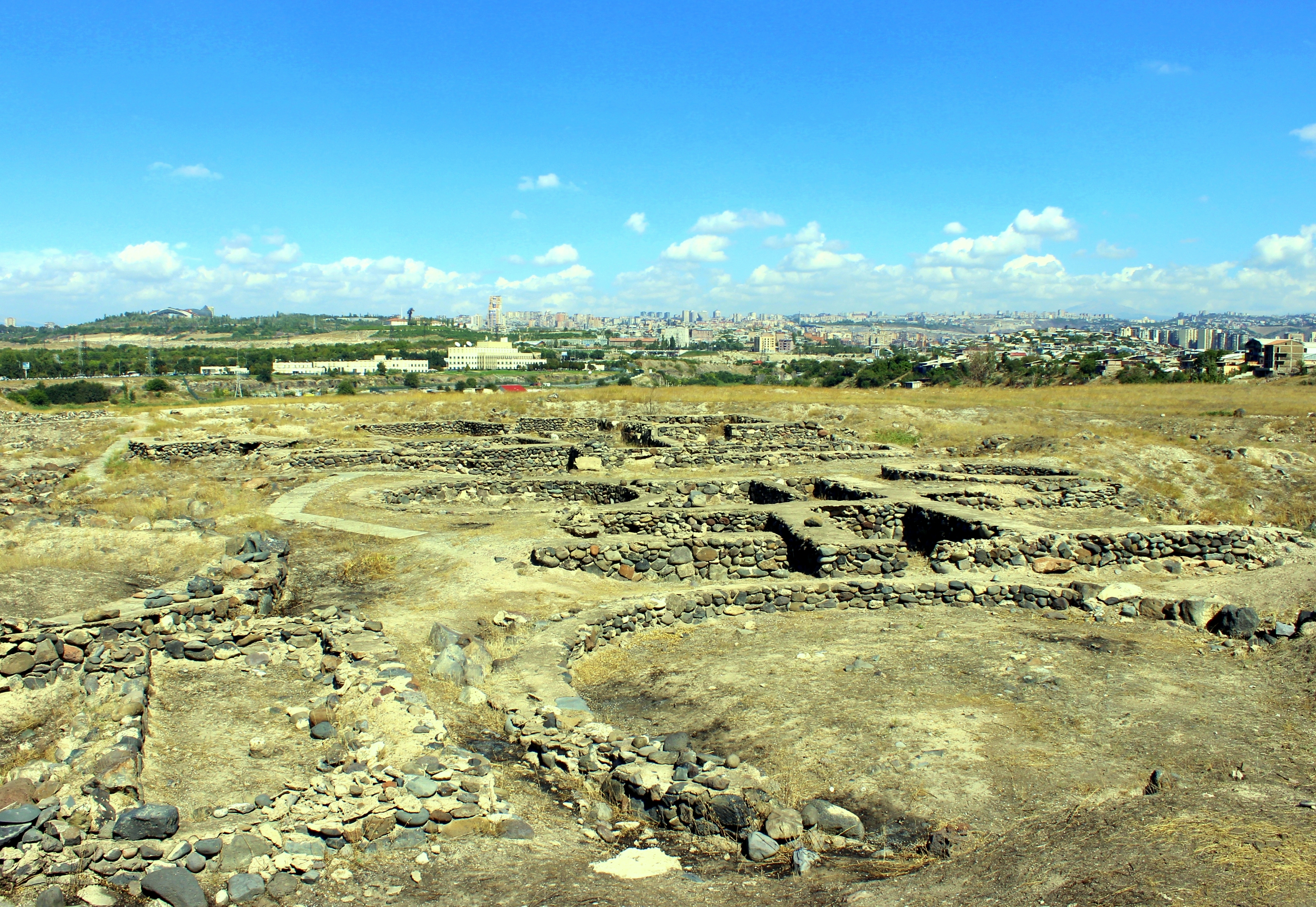
Shengavit Settlement, c. 3300 BC

- 3400–2000 BC – Kura-Araxes: earliest evidence found on the Ararat plain.
- Clay pots and vats discovered at a sprawling cave system in southern Armenia near the border with Iran shows signs of an organized effort to press and distill grapes

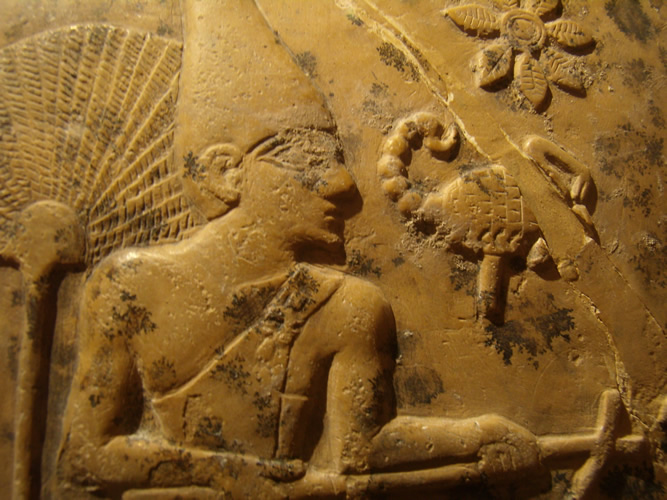
Pharaoh Scorpion II on the Scorpion Macehead, c. 3200 BC

- Egypt
  - 4000–3000 BC – Naqada culture on the Nile. First hieroglyphs appear thus far around 3500 BC as found on labels in a ruler's tomb at Abydos.
  - In the early part of Naqada III in Upper Egypt, the ruler, Horus-A, is crowned as ruler or king of Thinis (c. 3315 BC)
  - Predynastic pharaohs Tiu, Thesh, Hsekiu, Wazner, Ro, Serket, Narmer.
  - c. 3190–3170 BC?: Reign of King Double Falcon of Lower Egypt. There is a strong possibility that he appears on the Palermo stone, although half his name is chipped away.
  - c. 3100 BC?: Beginning of the Early Dynastic Period of Egypt, Horus was the main god worshiped in Upper Egypt, Neith was the main god worshiped in Lower Egypt.
  - c. 3141–3121 BC: Reign of Scorpion II in Upper Egypt..
  - c. 3121 BC?: Beginning of the reign of Narmer, first pharaoh to unify Ancient Egypt and founder of the 1st Dynasty.
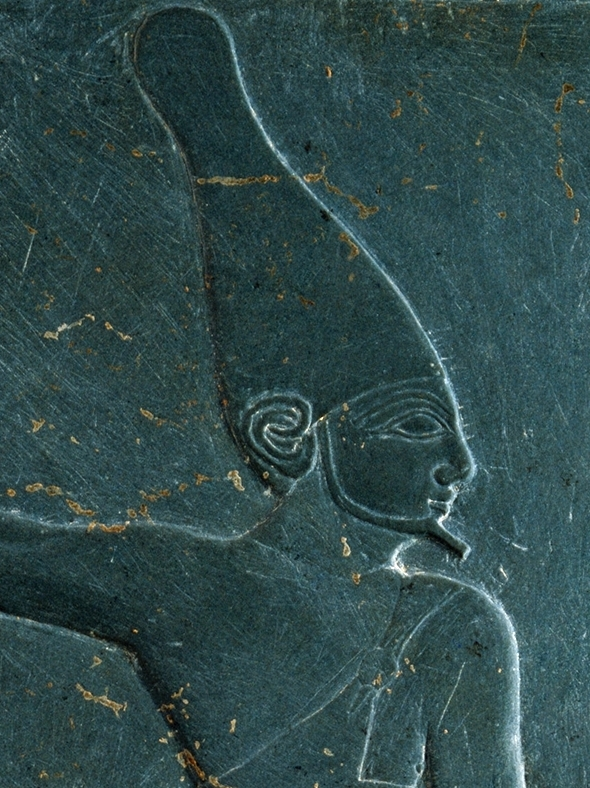
    King Narmer the first Pharaoh of Egypt who unified the country during this century
  - c. 3195–3165 BC?: King Iry-Hor reigns from Abydos over most of Egypt.
  - c. 3165–3141 BC: Reign of King Ka in Ancient Egypt.
  - 3500–3400 BC – Jar with boat designs, from Hierakonpolis (today in the Brooklyn Museum) is created. Predynastic Egypt.
  - c. 3500 BC: Pictographic proto-writing starts developing towards writing proper in Sumer, thus starting what is technically considered history.
  - c. 3150 BC – Predynastic period ended in Ancient Egypt. Early Dynastic (Archaic) period started (according to French Egyptologist Nicolas Grimal). The period includes 1st and 2nd Dynasties.
  - c. 3090 BC: Narmer (Menes) unifies Upper and Lower Egypt into one country; he rules this new country from Memphis.
  - Sails used in the Nile.
  - c. 3300 BC Cattle introduced to the Nile valley.
  - Mastabas, the predecessors of the Egyptian pyramids.
  - In Egypt, evidence found of mummification c. 3500 BC at a cemetery in Nekhen (Hierankopolis).
  - Ginger (mummy)
  - c. 3300 BC Egyptians domesticate the wild ass of North Africa. (Clutton-Brock)

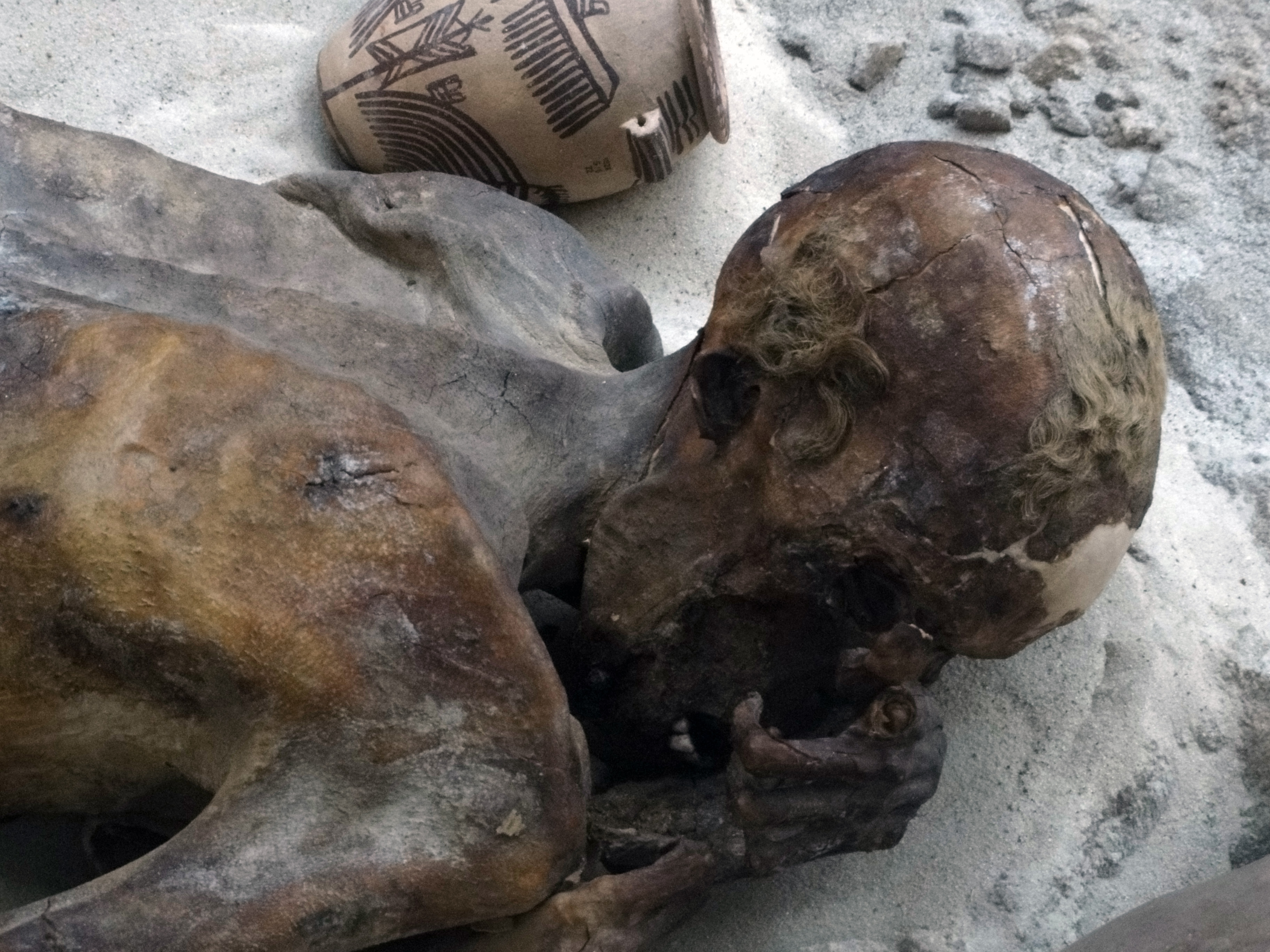
The head of EA 32751 ("Ginger") showing the preserved hair. Photo taken in 2011.

  - Lyres and double clarinets (arghul, mijwiz) played in Egypt.
  - Earliest known numerals in Egypt.
  - c. 3500 BC: First known zoo at Hierakonpolis.
- Levant
  - 4500–3500 BC – Levantine Chalcolithic, including the Ghassulian culture.

Europe

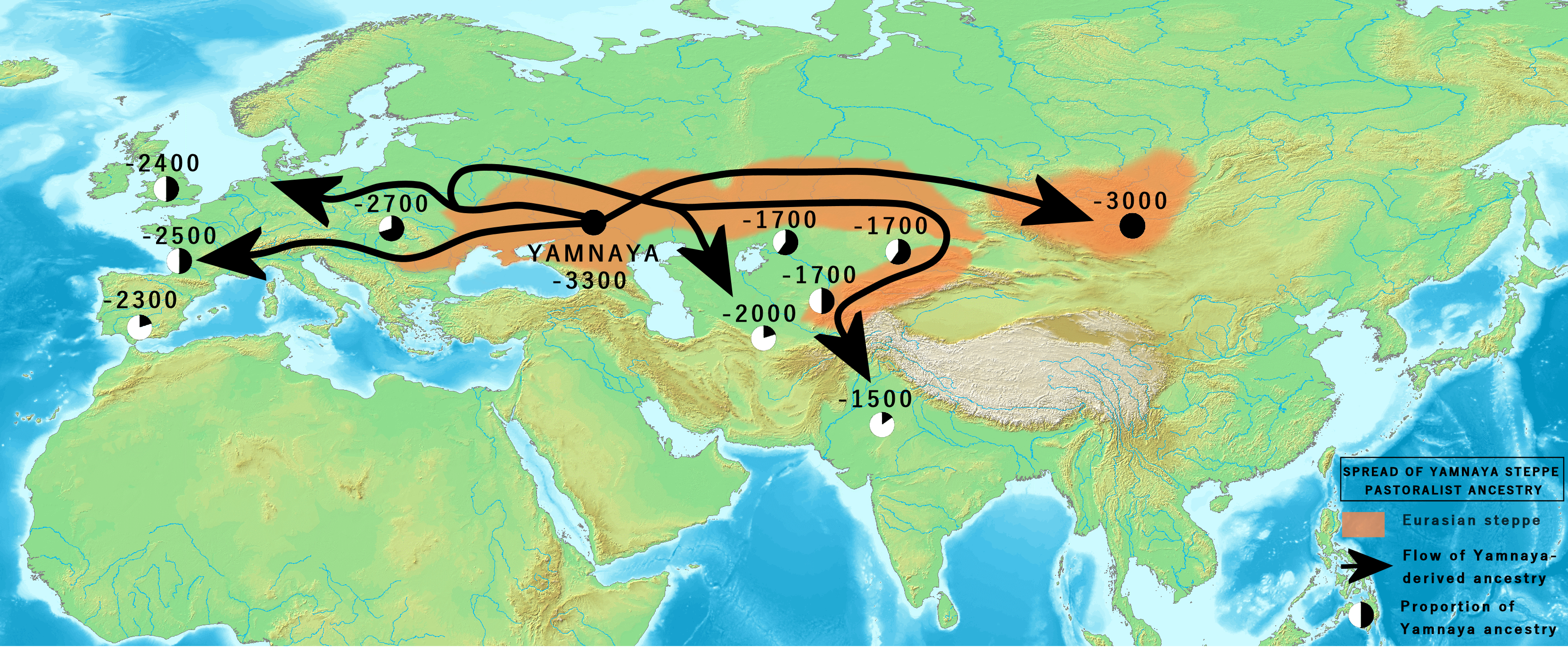
Bronze Age spread of Yamnaya steppe pastoralist ancestry into two subcontinents—Europe and South Asia—from c. 3300 to 1500 BC.

Metallurgy during the Copper Age developed in Europe.

- Mediterraenian
- c. 3300 BC: The Red Temple, the first phase of the Monte d'Accoddi sanctuary in Northwest Sardinia, is built.
- Crete: Rise of Minoan civilization.
- c. 4000 BC – First Neolithic settlers in the island of Thera (Santorini), Greece, migrating probably from Minoan Crete.
- Pontic–Caspian steppe
  - 3500–2300 BC – The Yamna culture ("Kurgan culture"), succeeding the Sredny Stog culture on the Pontic–Caspian steppe in the Caucasus and Central Asia. This culture is believed to have been the locus of the Proto-Indo-Europeans, and thus the Urheimat, or point of origin, of the Proto Indo-European language, according to the Kurgan hypothesis.
  - 3300–3000 BC: Evidence of proto-Thracians or proto-Dacians in the prehistoric period; Proto-Dacian or proto-Thracian people developed from a mixture of indigenous peoples and Indo-Europeans from the time of Proto-Indo-European expansion in the Early Bronze Age.
  - 5500–2750 BC – The Cucuteni–Trypillia culture has cities with 15,000 citizens, eastern Europe.
  - Kurgan culture of what is now Southern Russia and Ukraine; possibly the first domestication of the horse.
- Balkans
  - c. 3500 BC – Figures of a man and a woman, from Cernavodă, Romania, are made. They are now at National Historical Museum, Bucharest.
  - c. 3138 BC Ljubljana Marshes Wheel is a wooden wheel that was found in the Ljubljana Marsh in Slovenia. Radiocarbon dating showed that it is approximately 5,150 years old, which makes it the oldest wooden wheel yet discovered.
  - Baden culture
  - Boian culture
- Cucuteni culture
- Vinča culture
- c. 4000–2000 BC – People and animals, a detail of rock-shelter painting in Cogul (Roca dels Moros), Lleida, Spain, are painted. It is now at Archaeology Museum of Catalonia, Barcelona.
- Arzachena and Ozieri cultures.
- Malta
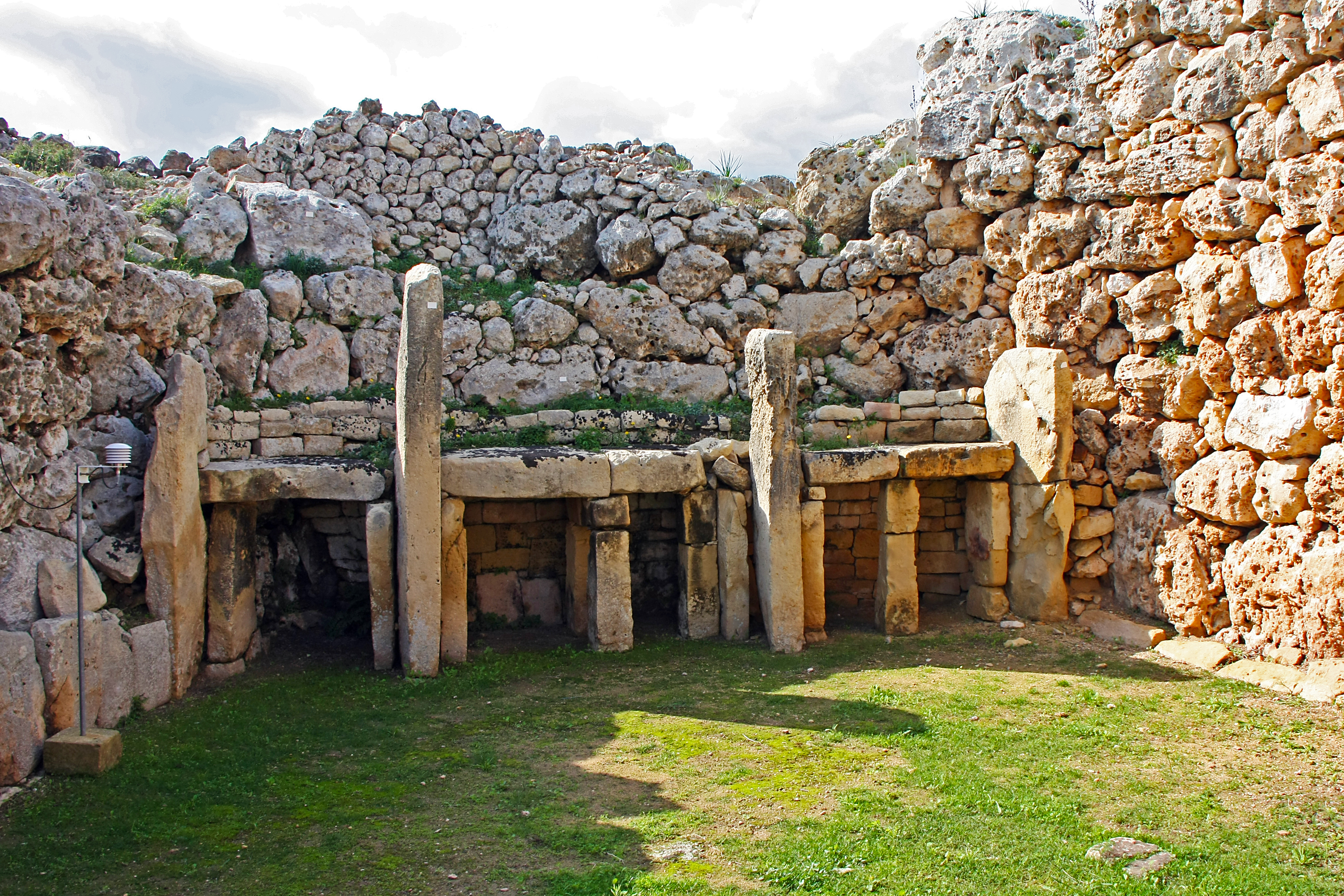
  The Ġgantija temples are the earliest of the Megalithic Temples of Malta
  - 3600 BC – Construction of the Ġgantija megalithic temple complex on the Island of Gozo: the world's oldest extant unburied free-standing structures, and the world's oldest religious structures. (See Göbekli Tepe for older, buried religious structures.)
  - 3600–3200 BC – Construction of the first temple within the Mnajdra solar temple complex, containing "furniture" such as stone benches and tables, that set it apart from other European megalith constructions.
  - Great Neolithic Plague occurs from circa 5450 BC to circa 2700 BC. This ensures for the large scaled expansions of the later early bronze age.
  - 3600–3000 BC – Construction of the Ta' Ħaġrat and Kordin III temples.
  - 3250–3000 BC – Construction of three megalithic temples at Tarxien.
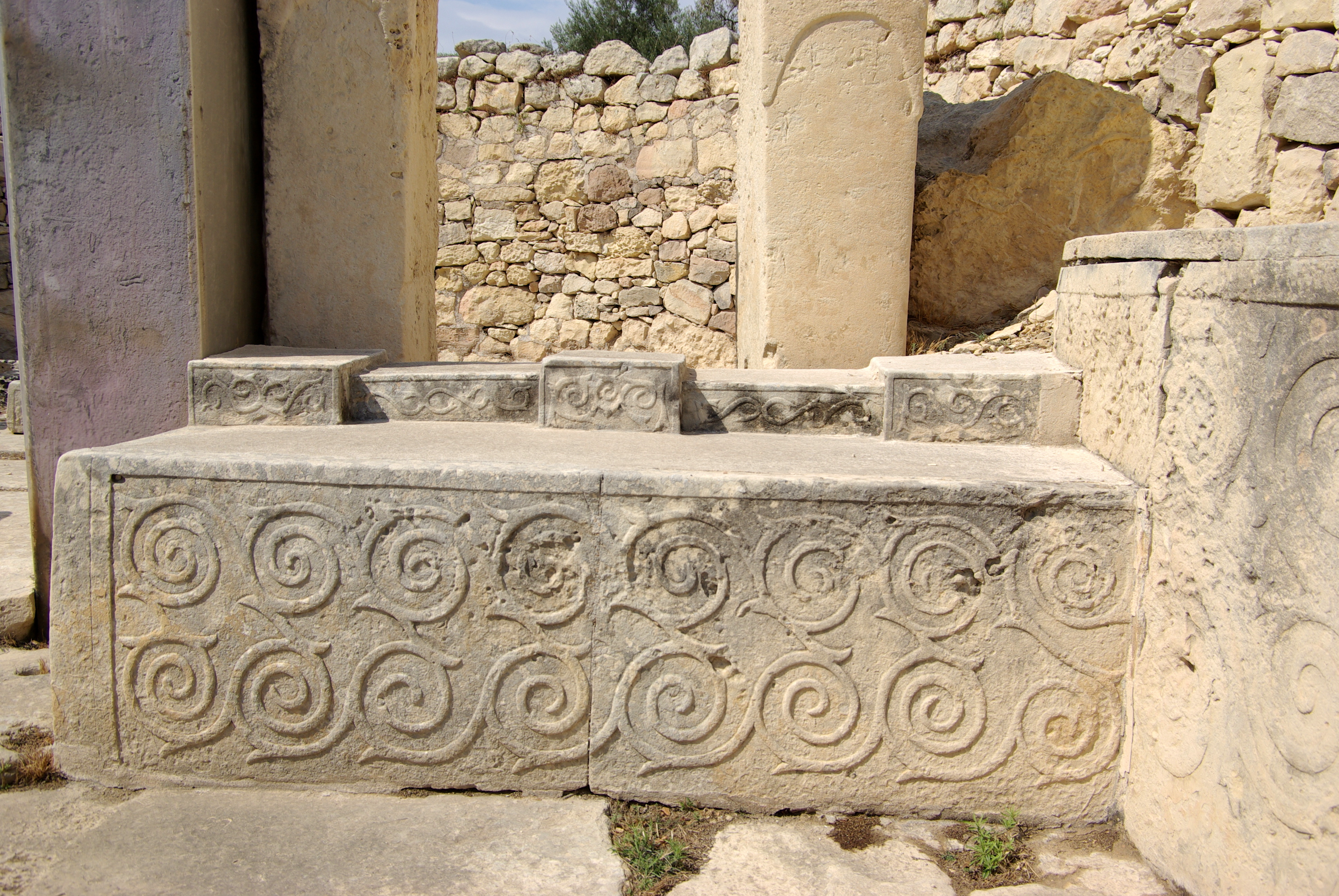
    Spiral design altar block from the Tarxien Temples of Malta, uncovered by Sir Themistocles Zammit
  - 3200–2500 BC – Construction of the Ħaġar Qim megalithic temple complex, featuring both solar and lunar alignments.
- Nuragic civilization (Sardinia)
- Northern and western Europe
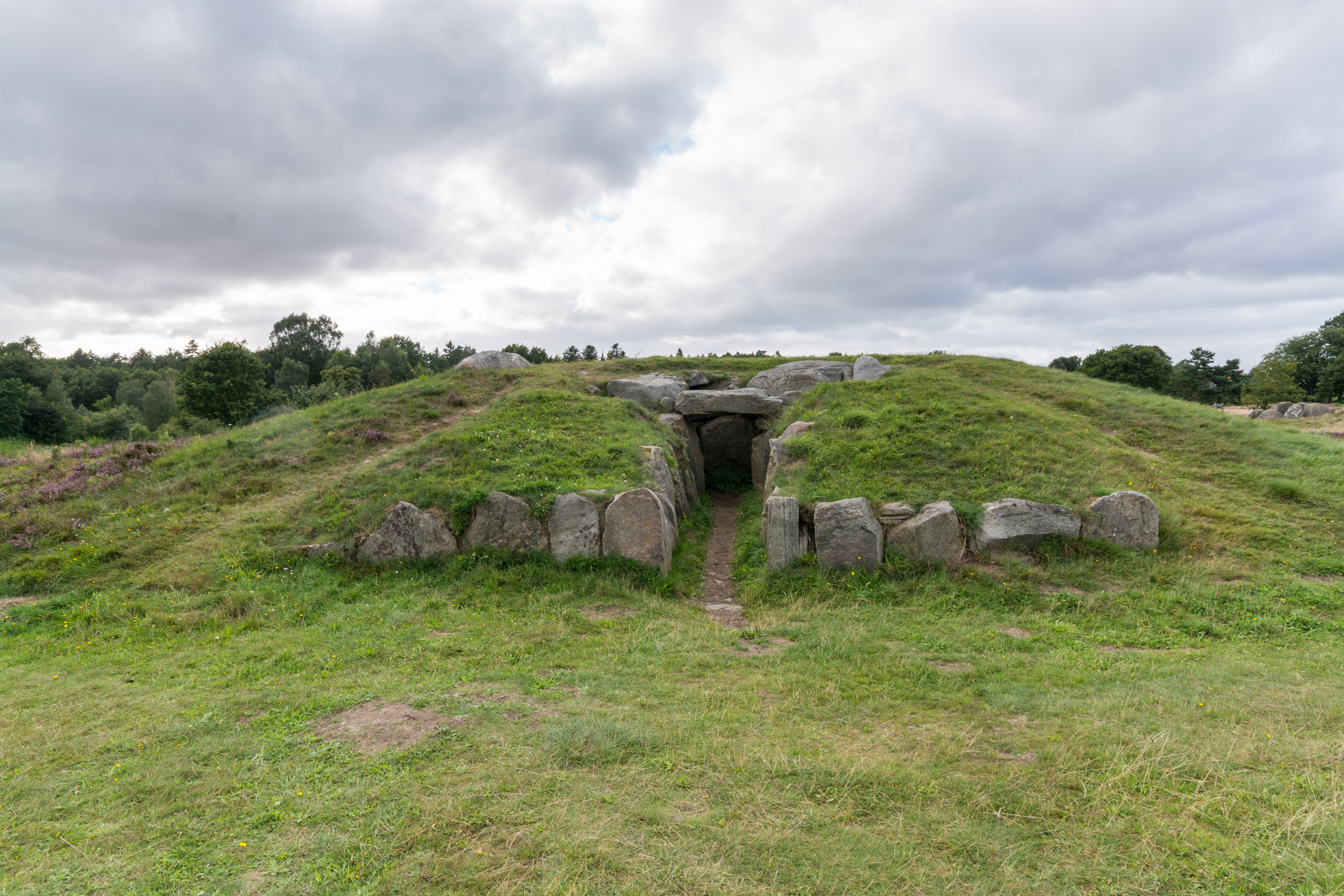
  Tustrup-dysserne, the largest passage grave in Eastern Jutland, is an example of Funnelbeaker culture circa 3200 BC
  - 4000–2700 BC – The Funnelbeaker culture, Scandinavia, originated in southern parts of Europe and slowly advanced up through today's Uppland.
  - Bronocice pot
  - 3300–2900 BC – Construction of the Newgrange solar observatory/passage tomb in Ireland.
  - c. 3100–2600 BC – Neolithic settlement at Skara Brae in the Orkney Islands, Scotland, is inhabited.
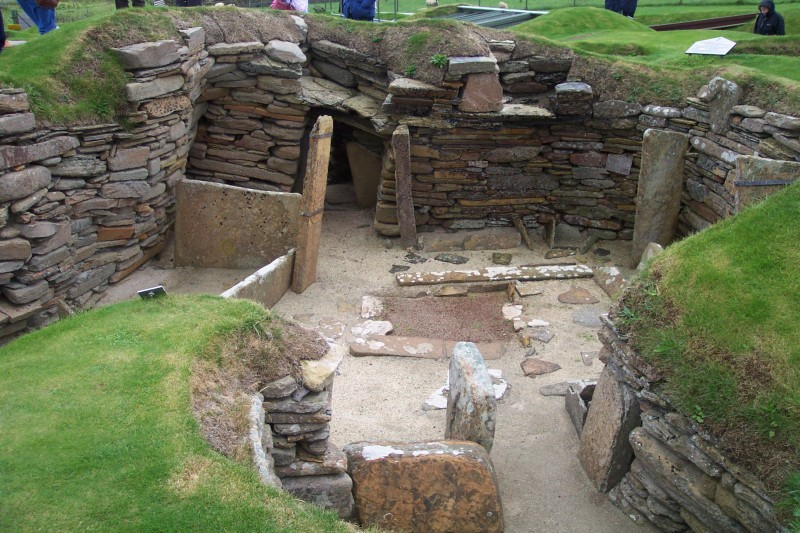
    Excavated dwellings at Skara Brae, Europe's most complete Neolithic village.
  - Knap of Howar
  - Construction in England of the Sweet Track, the world's first known engineered roadway.
  - Megalithic monuments are constructed in Brittany (Carnac), Portugal (Lisbon), central and southern France, Corsica and Great Britain
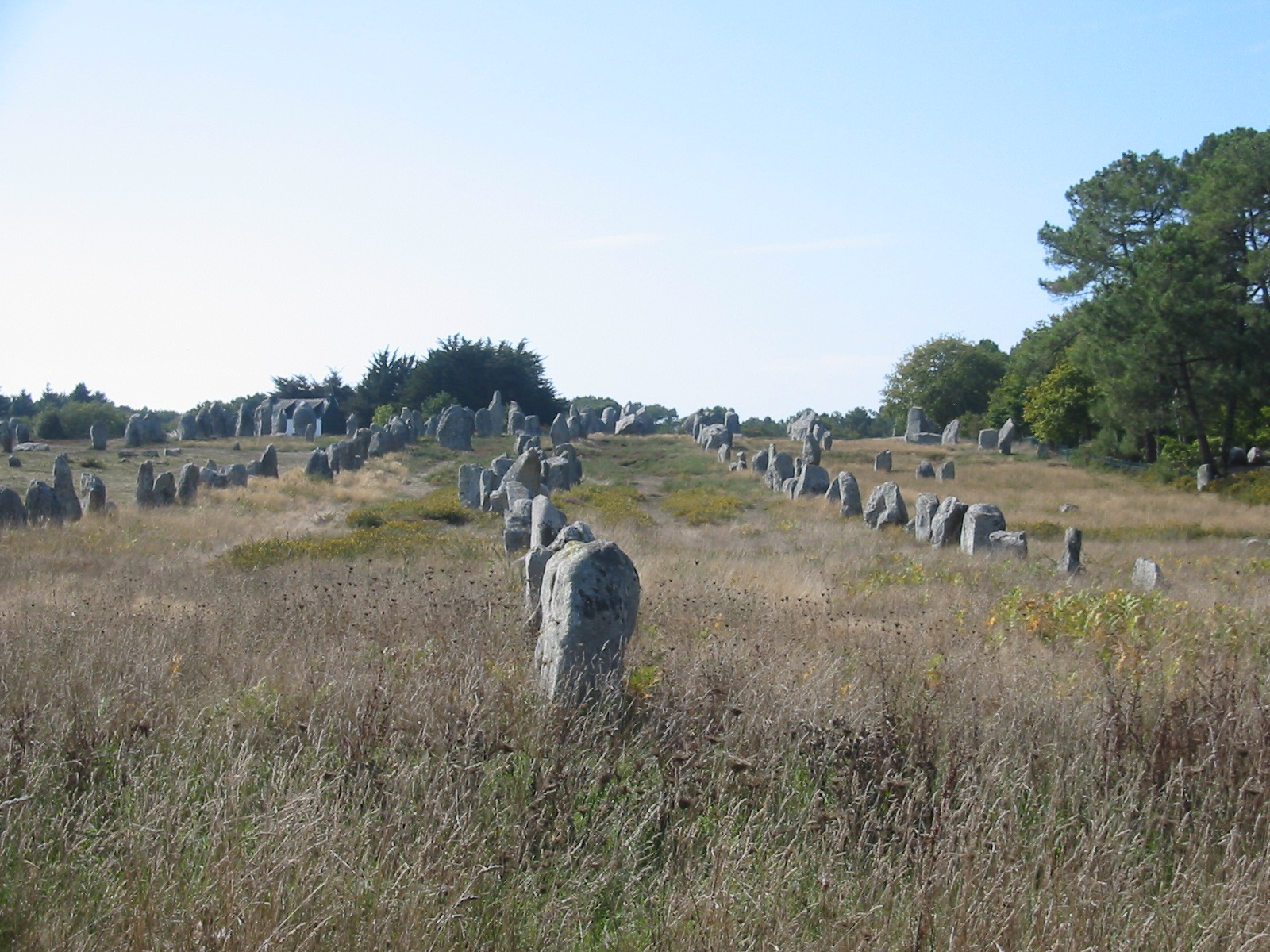
    Carnac standing stones, Brittany
  - In the south of England, a rapid expansion of monument building occurred around 3700 BC.
  - Garth tsunami in the Northern Isles.
  - Burial of a child at Ashleypark Burial Mound, Ireland (c. 3350 BC)
  - c. 3100 BC – The earliest phase of the Stonehenge monument (a circular earth bank and ditch).
  - The Céide Fields are developed, the first signs of the eventual complete deforestation of Ireland.
- c. 3300 BC – Ötzi the Iceman dies near the present-day border between Austria and Italy, only to be discovered in 1991 buried in a glacier of the Ötztal Alps. His cause of death is believed to be homicide.
- Chasséen culture, in present-day France, died out c. 3500 BC.
- Pfyn culture, in present-day Switzerland, died out c. 3500 BC.
- Comb Ceramic culture flourished in northeastern Europe.
- c. 3500 BC beginning of Wartberg culture (present-day Germany)
- The Post Track, an ancient causeway in the Somerset Levels, England, is built, c. 3838 BC. It is one of the oldest engineered roads discovered in this part of Europe.
- The Sweet Track, an ancient causeway also in the Somerset Levels, the oldest timber trackway discovered in Northern Europe, is built in 3807 BC or 3806 BC; tree-ring dating (dendrochronology) enabled very precise dating.

Central Asia

- 3500–2500 BC – Afanasevo: Siberia, Mongolia, Xinjiang, Kazakhstan—late copper and early Bronze Age.
- c. 3500 BC – Horses are domesticated in the western Eurasian Steppes in what is now northern Kazakhstan (see the Botai culture).
- Bactria Margiana civilization (circa 3000 BC) alongside trade routes connection with Proto-dynastic Egypt.
- The Maykop culture, a major Bronze Age archaeological culture in the Western Caucasus region of Southern Russia, began around 3700 BC.

South and East Asia

- c. 3300 BC: Indus Valley civilisation (also known as Harappan civilization) begins in Harappa. Harappan script is developed.
- c. 4000 BC Fortified town at Amri on the west bank of the Indus River.
- c. 3500 BC: The Eruption of Mount Isarog in the Philippines.
- Neolithic Chinese settlements. They produced silk and pottery (chiefly the Yangshao and the Longshan cultures), wore hemp clothing, and domesticated pigs and dogs.
- Liangzhu culture develops in the Yangtze River Delta.
- 4000–2500 BC – Vietnamese Bronze Age culture. The Đồng Đậu Culture, produced many wealthy bronze objects.
- Transition from early to middle Jōmon period on the islands of Japan.

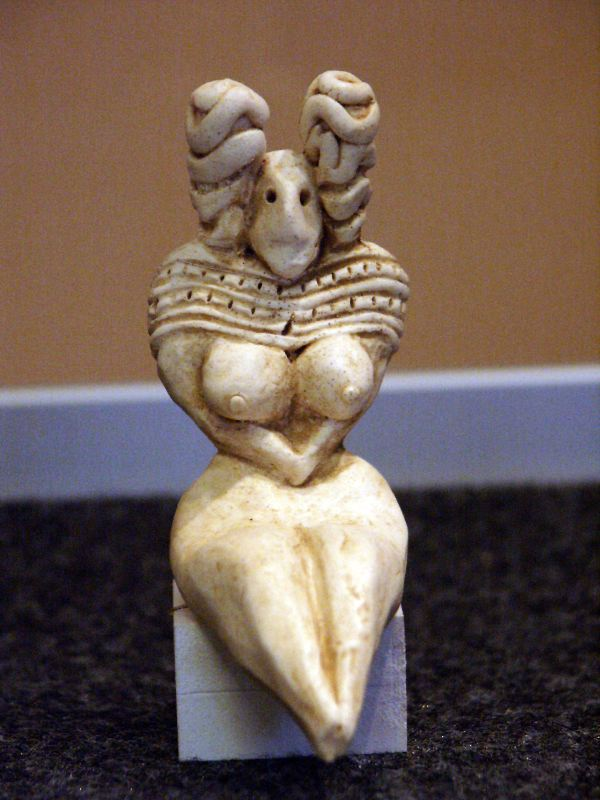
Fertility figurine from Mehrgarh, Indus Valley, c. 3000 BC

Indian Subcontinent

- Mehrgarh III–VI
- 3500 BC Metalcasting began in the Mohenjodaro area.
- 3300 BC – Bronze Age starts in Indus Valley (Harappa).
  - Drainage and Sewage collection and disposal

Americas

The Americas were in the Meso-Indian (Archaic) stage.

- c. 3600 BC – In Colombia, first rupestrian art Chiribiquete (Caquetá).
- c. 3000 BC – First pottery in Colombia at Puerto Hormiga (Magdalena), considered one of the first attempts of pottery of the New World. First settlement at Puerto Badel (Bolívar).
- c. 3600 BC – Evidence of maize domestication appear in the Valley of Tehuacán. First known evidence of popcorn. Excavations of the Bat Cave in west central New Mexico in 1948 and 1950 discovered ears of popcorn dated to circa 3600 BC.
- Norte Chico civilization in Northern Peru starts.
- c. 3500 BC: Mound building in North America appears at Watson Brake.
- c. 3100 BC: Oldest adobe building in the Americas was built in what is now Peru.
- Settlement of the River area of Barbuda (c. 3685 BC), formation of sand dunes on Palmetto Point.
- c. 3106 BC: Earliest known human activity in Antigua at Little Deep.
- c. 3484 BC: The oldest estimated germination of Alerce Milenario with more conservative dates of only ‘c.1653 BC’.

Australia

- c. 3000 BC – The Sydney rock engravings in present-day (Sydney, Australia).

Sub-Saharan Africa

Sub-Saharan Africa remains in the Paleolithic period, except for the earliest neolithization of the Sahel following the desiccation of the Sahara in c. 3500 BC. As the grasslands of the Sahara began drying after 3900 BC, herders spread into the Nile Valley and into eastern Africa (Eburan 5, Elmenteitan). The desiccation of the Sahara and the associated neolithisation of West Africa is also cited as a possible cause for the dispersal of the Niger-Congo linguistic phylum.

== Environment ==
Based on studies by glaciologist Lonnie Thompson, professor at Ohio State University and researcher with the Byrd Polar Research Center, a number of indicators shows there was a global change in climate 5,200 years ago, probably due to a drop in solar energy output.

- The Older Peron transgression was a period identified in 1961 happening between 6,000 and 4,600 years BP when sea levels were 3 to 5 metres higher than today.
- Plants buried in the Quelccaya Ice Cap in the Peruvian Andes demonstrate the climate had shifted suddenly and severely to capture the plants and preserve them until now.
- c. 3750 BC – The last North American mammoths, on Saint Paul Island, Alaska, go extinct.
- Tree rings from Ireland and England show this was their driest period.
- Ice core records showing the ratio of two oxygen isotopes retrieved from the ice fields atop Africa's Mount Kilimanjaro, a proxy for atmospheric temperature at the time snow fell.
- Major changes in plant pollen uncovered from lakebed cores in South America.
- Record lowest levels of methane retrieved from ice cores from Greenland and Antarctica.
- End of the Neolithic Subpluvial, start of desertification of Sahara (35th century BC). North Africa shifts from a habitable region to a barren desert.
- c. 3150 BC – a lesser Tollmann's hypothetical bolide event may have occurred.
- 3051 BC – The oldest currently (2025) living non-clonal organism, a Great Basin bristlecone pine, germinated in the present-day Grove of the Ancients, Inyo County, California.

== Calendars and chronology ==
- 4000 BC – Epoch of the Masonic calendar's Anno Lucis era.
- 3929 BC – Creation according to John Lightfoot based on the Old Testament of the Bible, and often associated with the Ussher chronology.
- 3761 BC –
  - Since the Middle Ages (12th century), the Hebrew calendar has been based on rabbinic calculations of the year of creation from the Hebrew Masoretic Text of the bible. This calendar is used within Jewish communities for religious and other purposes. The calendar's epoch, corresponding to the calculated date of the world's creation, is equivalent to sunset on the Julian proleptic calendar date 6 October 3761 BC.
  - 25th of Elul, 7 October 3761 BC — Considered the first day of creation from formless matter (Gen. 1.2), traditionally interpreted as out of nothing, on which the Bible recalls that God created existence, time, matter, darkness and light.
  - 1st of Tishrei, 12 October 3761 BC — Considered the sixth day of creation (Rosh Hashanah Day 1), on which the Bible recalls that God created Adam and Eve.
- 3114 BC – One version of the Mayan calendar, known as the Mesoamerican Long Count, uses the epoch of 11 or 13 August 3114 BC. The Maya Long Count calendar was first used approximately 236 BC (see Mesoamerican Long Count calendar#Earliest Long Counts.
- 3102 BC – According to calculations of Aryabhata (6th century), the Hindu Kali Yuga began at midnight on 18 February 3102 BC. Lasting for 432,000 years (1,200 divine years), Kali Yuga began 5,127 years ago and has 426,873 years left as of 2026 CE. Kali Yuga will end in the year 428,899 CE. (Note: Calculations exclude year zero. 1 BCE to 1 CE is one year, not two.)
- 3102 BC – Aryabhata dates the events of the Mahabharata to around 3102 BC. Other estimates range from the late 4th to the mid-2nd millennium BC.
