= 2719 =

2719 may refer to:

- 2719 (number)
- 2719, a year in the 28th century
- 2719 BC, a year in the 28th century BC
- 2719 Suzhou, an asteroid
