= 2150 (disambiguation) =

2150 is a year in the 22nd century.

2150 may also refer to:

- 2150 BC, a year in the 22nd century BC
- Daleks' Invasion Earth 2150 A.D., a 1966 British science fiction film
- Earth 2150, a 2000 real-time strategy video game
