= 23rd century BC =

One hundred years, from 2300 BC to 2201 BC

The 23rd century BC was a century that lasted from the year 2300 BC to 2201 BC.

== Events ==
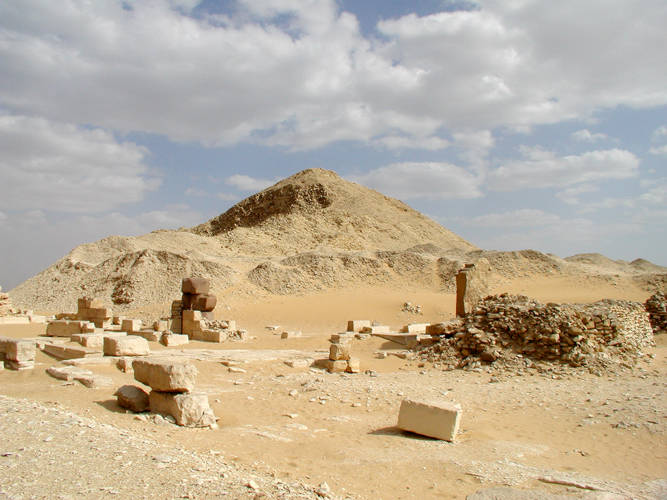
Ruins of the pyramid complex of Pepi II, possibly the longest-reigning monarch in recorded history

- 2334 BC – 2279 BC: (short chronology) Sargon of Akkad's conquest of Mesopotamia.
- c. 2300 BC: Indus Valley Civilization (Harappan) flourishing in modern-day eastern Pakistan - western India.
- c. 2300 BC: Metals start to be used in Northern Europe.
- c. 2300 BC: The Unetice culture emerges in the modern-day Czech Republic.
- c. 2300 BC: Canal Bahr Yusuf (current name) is created when the waterway from the Nile to the natural lake (now Lake Moeris) is widened and deepened to create a canal.
- c. 2300 BC – 2200 BC: "Head of a man from Nineveh" (modern Kuyunjik, Iraq) is made. It is now in the Iraq Museum, Baghdad.
- c. 2300 BC – 2184 BC: The Disc of Enheduanna, from Ur (modern Muqaiyir, Iraq) is made. It is now in the University of Pennsylvania Museum of Archaeology and Anthropology, University of Pennsylvania, Philadelphia.
- c. 2300–2250 BC, reigns of Pepi I Meryre and Merenre Nemtyemsaf I, beginning of Pepi II Neferkare's rule, all of the Sixth Dynasty of Egypt.
- c. 2288 BC: "Queen Merye-ankhnes and her son Pepy II" is sculpted, Sixth dynasty of Egypt. The alabaster statuette is now at the Brooklyn Museum of Art, New York.
- c. 2285 BC: Enheduanna, high priestess of the moon god Nanna in Ur, was born.
- c. 2254 BC – 2218 BC: The Stela of Naram-Sin, probably from Sippar, discovered in Susa (modern Shush, Iran), was made. It is now in the Musée du Louvre, Paris.
- c. 2251 BC: The beginning of the Meghalayan Stage, the last of the three stages of the Holocene.
- c. 2250 BC: Earliest evidence of maize cultivation in Central America.
- c. 2240 BC: Akkad, capital of the Akkadian Empire, becomes the largest city in the world, surpassing Memphis, capital of Egypt.
- c. 2220 BC: Scord of Brouster farmstead established in the Shetland islands
- c. 2220 BC: Mount Edgecumbe volcano erupts near present-day Sitka, Alaska.
- c. 2215 BC: A Guti army swept down from the Zagros Mountains and defeated the demoralized Akkadian army. They took Agade, the capital of Akkad, and destroyed it thoroughly.
- c. July 2215 BC: Comet Hale-Bopp visits the inner Solar System and would not return until the year AD 1997.
