= Đồng Đậu culture =

Pre-historic culture of Vietnam

The Đồng Đậu culture (c. 1,500-1,000 BC) was a culture of the Middle Bronze Age in Vietnam. The pottery of the Đồng Đậu culture is distinguished from Phùng Nguyên culture pottery by parallel markings.

== Gallery ==
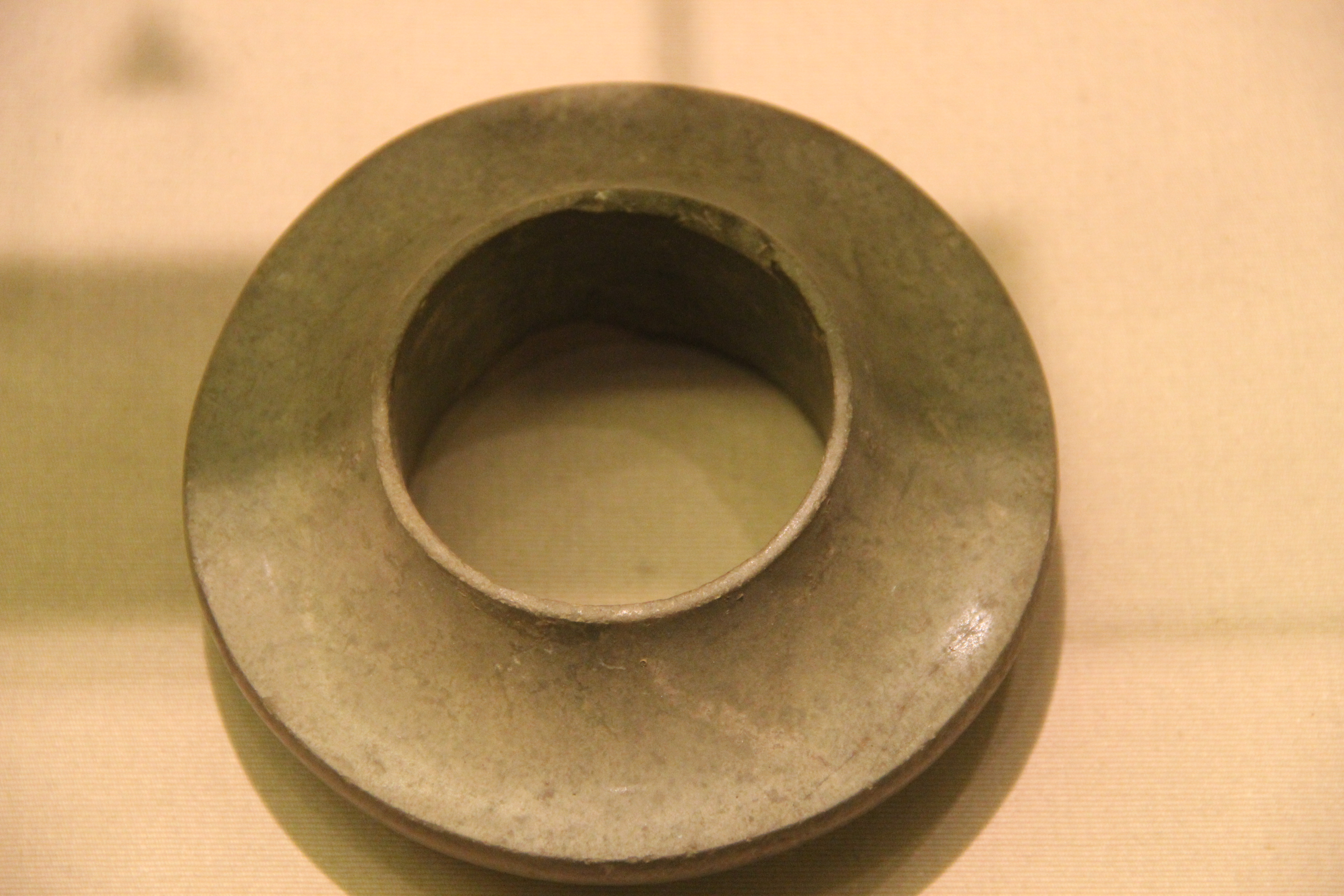
Đồng Đậu culture stone bracelet

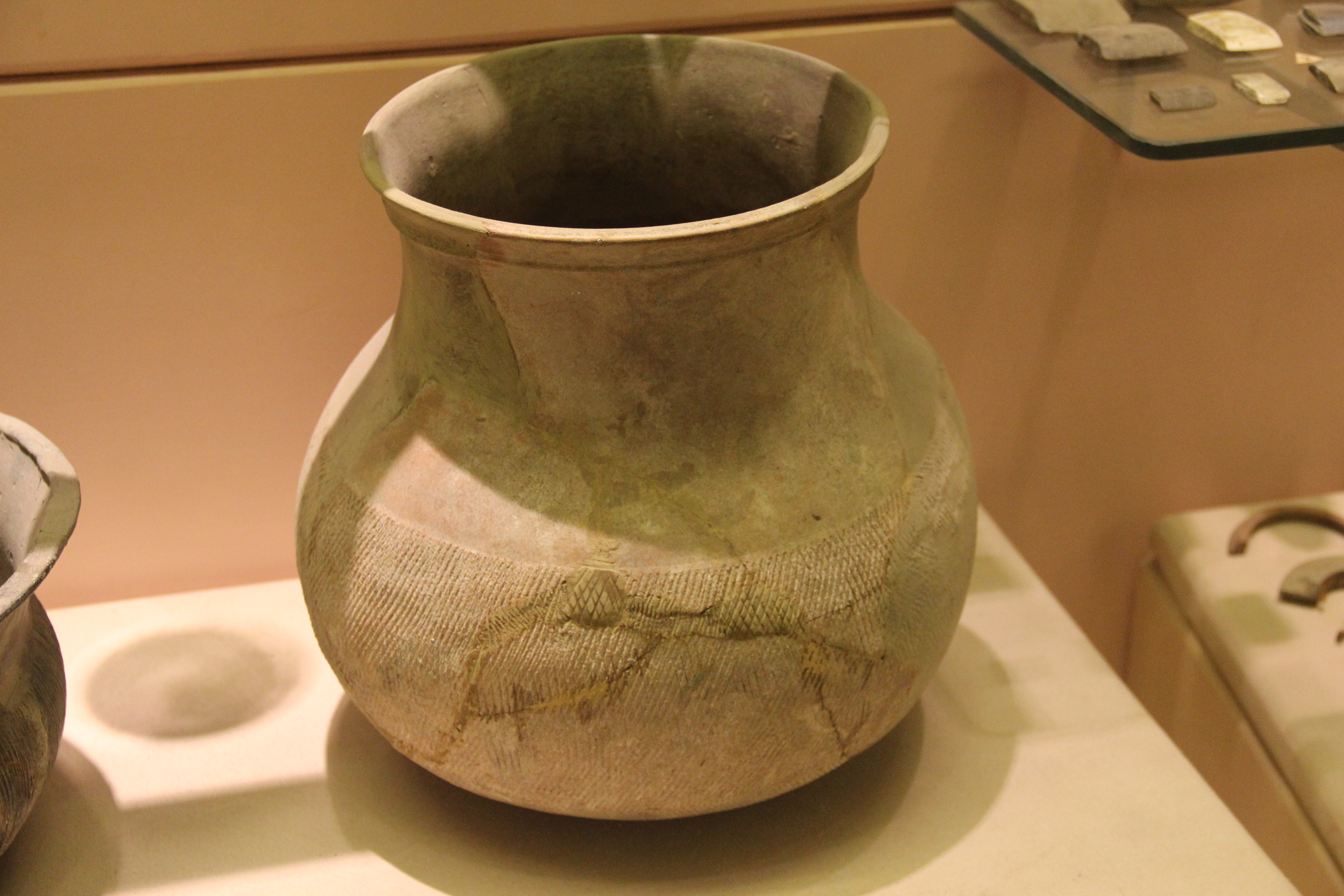
Đồng Đậu culture pot

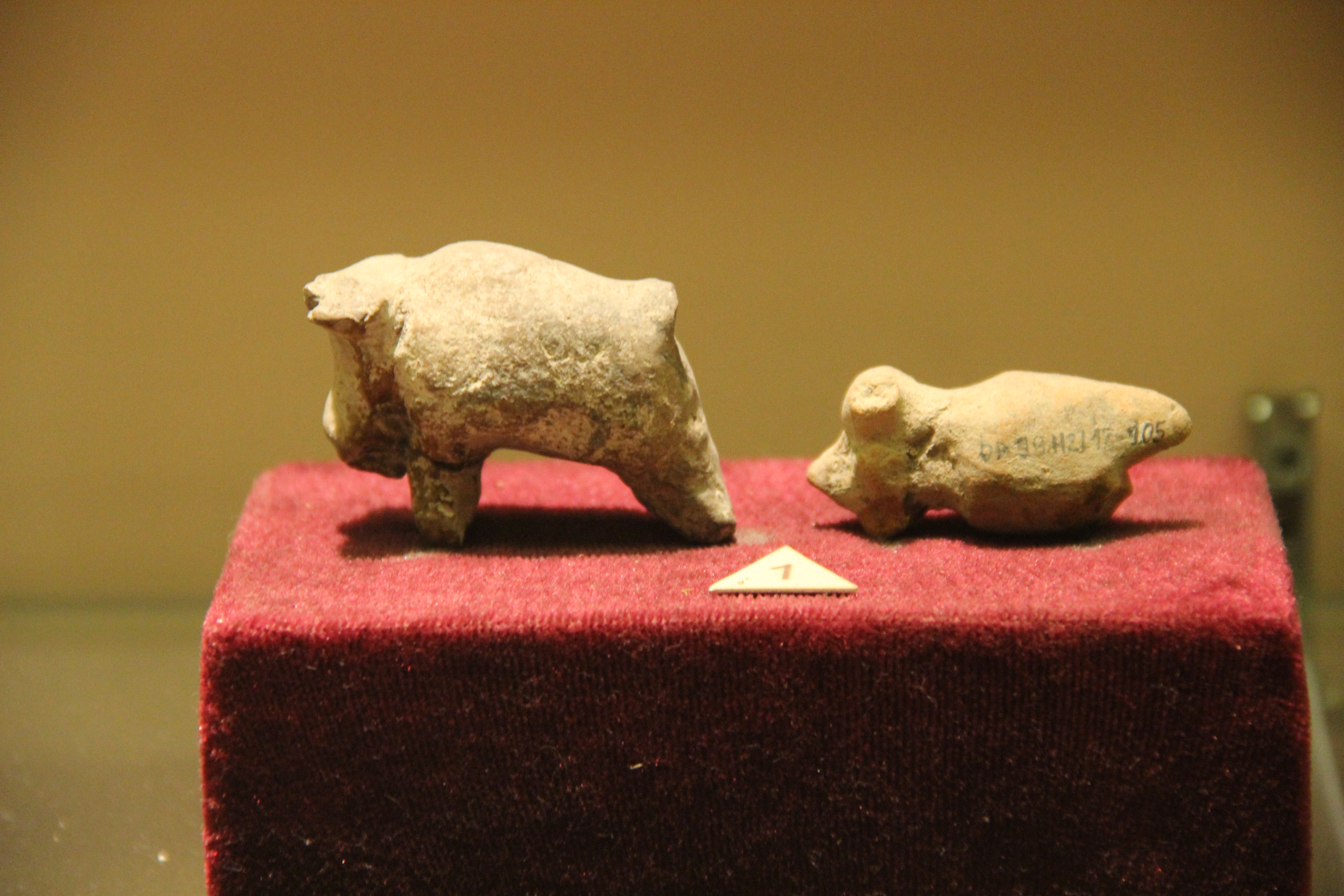
Đồng Đậu culture pottery animal figurines
