= Ashleypark Burial Mound =

Tomb in Ireland

- Dumha Pháirc Ashley (Irish)
- Location within Ireland
- 52.933888°N 8.188852°W
- Type: passage tomb
- Location: Ashleypark, Nenagh, County Tipperary, Ireland

History
- Built: c. 3350 BC

Site notes
- Elevation: 89 m (292 ft)
- Height: 5 m (16 ft)

National monument of Ireland
- Official name: Ashleypark Burial Mound (Cist)
- Reference no.: 573

Ashleypark Burial Mound is a passage tomb and National Monument in the townland of Ashleypark, County Tipperary, Ireland.

== Location ==
Ashleypark Burial Mound is located 2.1 km (1.3 mi) west of Ardcroney, 1 km north of Ashleypark House and Lough Ourna.

== History ==
Ashleypark Burial Mound dates to the Neolithic: radiocarbon dating indicates a calendar date of c. 3350 BC for the burial in the chamber of an infant. The inner end of the structure contained an adult and child, cattle bones, a bone point, some chert flakes and Neolithic pottery, including sherds bearing channelled decoration. It lay until recently in an ancient oak forest. The site was damaged by bulldozing in 1980.

== Description ==
The mound is described as a Linkardstown-type cist but may be a simple passage grave. It consists of a round mound encircled by two low wide banks with internal ditches giving an overall diameter of 90 m (100 yd). The inner mound is 26 m (30 yd) in diameter with a cairn core covered in clay.

The megalith is trapezoidal in shape, 5m long and narrowing from 2.3m wide at the SE to 1.3 m at the NW (open) end. It was built around a limestone erratic which serves as a floorstone.
