= Kish tablet =

Sumerian proto-writing (Late Uruk period)

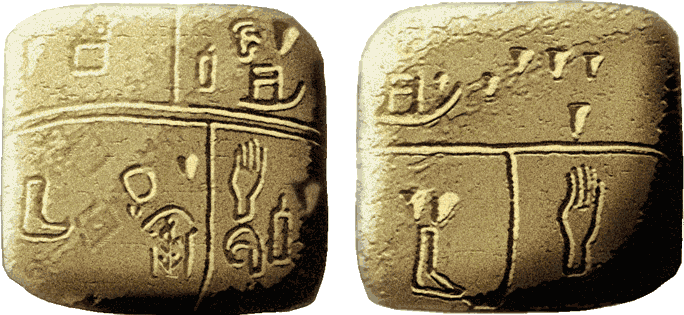
- Limestone tablet from Kish (Sumer) with pictographic writing, Late Uruk period – Ashmolean Museum
- Geographical range: Iraq
- Period: Late Uruk period (c. 3500–2900 BC)
- Dates: After 3500 BC

The Kish tablet is a limestone tablet found at the site of the ancient Sumerian city of Kish in modern Tell al-Uhaymir, Babylon Governorate, Iraq. A plaster cast of the tablet is in the collection of the Ashmolean Museum, while the original is housed at the Iraq Museum in Baghdad. It should not be confused with the Scheil dynastic tablet, which contains part of the Sumerian King List and is also sometimes called the Kish tablet.

The signs on the Kish tablet, possibly related to proto-cuneiform, are purely pictographic, and have not been deciphered or demonstrated to correspond to any currently known human language. It has been dated to the Late Uruk period (c. 3200–3000 BC).

== See also ==
- History of writing
- Narmer Palette
- Warka Vase
