= Scord of Brouster =

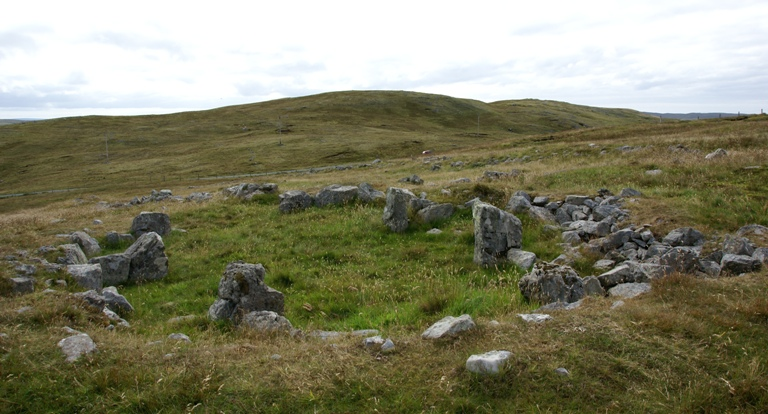
- One of the houses in 2008
- Interactive map of Scord of Brouster
- 60°14′55.54″N 1°32′21.78″W
- Type: Settlement
- Location: Scotland, United Kingdom

History
- Built: c. 2220 BC

The Scord of Brouster is one of the earliest Neolithic farm sites in Shetland, Scotland. It has been dated to around 2220 BC with a time window of 80 years on either side. It comprises three houses, several fields surrounded by walls, and a cairn. A sign by the Scord of Brouster states that the climate of Shetland became wetter around 1500 BC, and that peat forming near the fields eventually forced the farmers to permanently abandon the site. The site was excavated by Alasdair Whittle in the late 1970s, because he wanted investigate on early agricultural settlement in Britain in a remote part of the country, unspoilt by modern development.

== Site ==
The Scord of Brouster has three oval-shaped houses. The first house is oriented so that its long axis is parallel to the northwest–southeast axis, and it is around 13 metres (43 ft) long and 10 metres (34 ft) wide. It has an entrance at its southeastern end and six recesses. The second house is around 11 metres (35 ft) long and 8.2 metres (27 ft) wide. It is more kidney-shaped than the first house, and it has only two recesses rather than six, of which one, 2 metres (6.6 ft) long, may be a sleeping area. Like the second house, the third house is around 11 metres (35 ft) long and 8.2 metres (27 ft) wide.

== Artefacts ==
In all, nearly 10,000 pieces of quartz were found at the Scord of Brouster. 5,688 stone artefacts were found in house one, 3,772 stone artefacts were found in house two, and only 227 stone artefacts were found in house three. Of the 227 items found in house three, 225 are merely quartz flakes and chips. These pieces were found in what appears to be three phases: prior to the construction of the buildings, during active use, and during abandonment.

=== House one ===
Before this house was built, most of the artefacts were scattered across the southern portion of the building's area. After the construction of the house, the centre of the building had far fewer quartz artefacts. Instead, the artefacts were concentrated in places inside the house beside the walls. In the final phase, most stone pieces were found by the walls of the house.

=== House two ===
Both prior to construction and during its use, the artefacts were mostly concentrated on the western side and near the central fireplace. The eastern side had very few artefacts, and a recess in the northeast corner had even fewer, which led the archaeologists to believe that it may have been a sleeping area. After abandonment, the artefacts were scattered relatively evenly across the entire area.

The second house contained only about three-fourths the number of tool artefacts that the first house did. However, they had nearly identical percentages of types of tools found. For example, house one contained 91 scrapers compared to the 69 found in house two, but that corresponds to 75% of the artefacts found in house one and 77% of the artefacts found in house two.

=== House three ===
Relatively few artefacts were found in the third house, so there was no real way for the researchers to discover any concentrations of artefacts.

== See also ==
- Neolithic Europe
- Stone Age
