= 28th century BC =

One hundred years, from 2800 BC to 2701 BC

The 28th century BC was a century that lasted from the year 2800 BC to 2701 BC.

== Events ==
- c. 2800 BC – 2700 BC: Seated Harp Player, from Keros, Cyclades, is made. It is now at the Metropolitan Museum of Art, New York.
- 2775 BC – 2650 BC: Second Dynasty wars in Ancient Egypt.
- c. 2750 BC: Estimated ending of the Cucuteni-Trypillian culture in the region of modern-day Romania, Moldova, and southwestern Ukraine.

== Inventions, discoveries, introductions ==
- Tyre is founded in 2750 BC (according to Herodotus).
