= 29th century BC =

One hundred years, from 2900 BC to 2801 BC

The 29th century BC was a century that lasted from the year 2900 BC to 2801 BC.

== Events ==
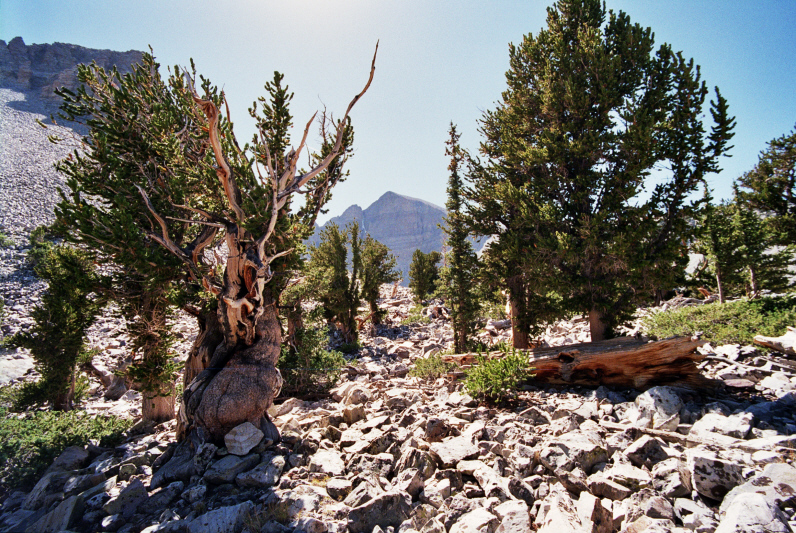
The grove in which the Prometheus Tree grew, with the Wheeler Peak headwall in the distance

- c. 2900 BC: Beginning of the Early Dynastic Period I in Sumer.
- c. 2900 BC: 2600 BC: Votive statues from the Square Temple of Eshnunna (modern Tell Ashmar, Iraq) were made. One of them is now in the Oriental Institute of the University of Chicago. Excavated 1932–1933.
- c. 2900 BC: 2400 BC: Sumerian pictographs evolve into phonograms.
- 2900 BC: 2334 BC: Mesopotamian wars of the Early Dynastic period.
- 2900 BC: First Mariote Kingdom founded.
- 2890 BC: Ancient Egypt: Pharaoh Qa'a died. End of First Dynasty, start of Second Dynasty. Pharaoh Hotepsekhemwy started to rule.
- 2890 BC: Akkadian language names are recorded from about this time period.
- 2880 BC: Estimated germination of the Prometheus Tree, previously thought to be the world's oldest living organism until it was cut down in 1964 AD.
- 2879 BC: Hùng Vương Kinh Dương Vương established the Hồng Bàng dynasty in Vietnam (then known as Xích Quỷ).
- c. 2874 BC: The 365-day calendar year was installed in ancient Egypt, with fixed lunar months of 30 days + 5 epagomenal days.
- 2863 BC: Egyptian 2nd Dynasty Prince Raneb born around this year in history.
- 2860 BC: Saqqara Tomb A construction started.
- 2852 BC: The beginning of the period of the Three Sovereigns and Five Emperors in China.
- 2832 BC: Estimated germination of the oldest living tree and organism on earth as of 2020 the Methuselah Tree, the second-oldest known organism. Sprouting in what would become Inyo County, California.
- 2807 BC: Suggested date for an asteroid or comet impact occurring between Africa and Antarctica, around the time of a lunar eclipse on May 10, based on an analysis of flood stories. Possibly causing the Burckle crater and Fenambosy Chevron.
- Ur becomes one of the richest cities in Sumer

== Architecture ==
- 29th century BC in architecture
