= 22nd century BC =

One hundred years, from 2200 BC to 2101 BC

The 22nd century BC is a century that lasted between the years 2200 BC and 2101 BC.

== Events ==
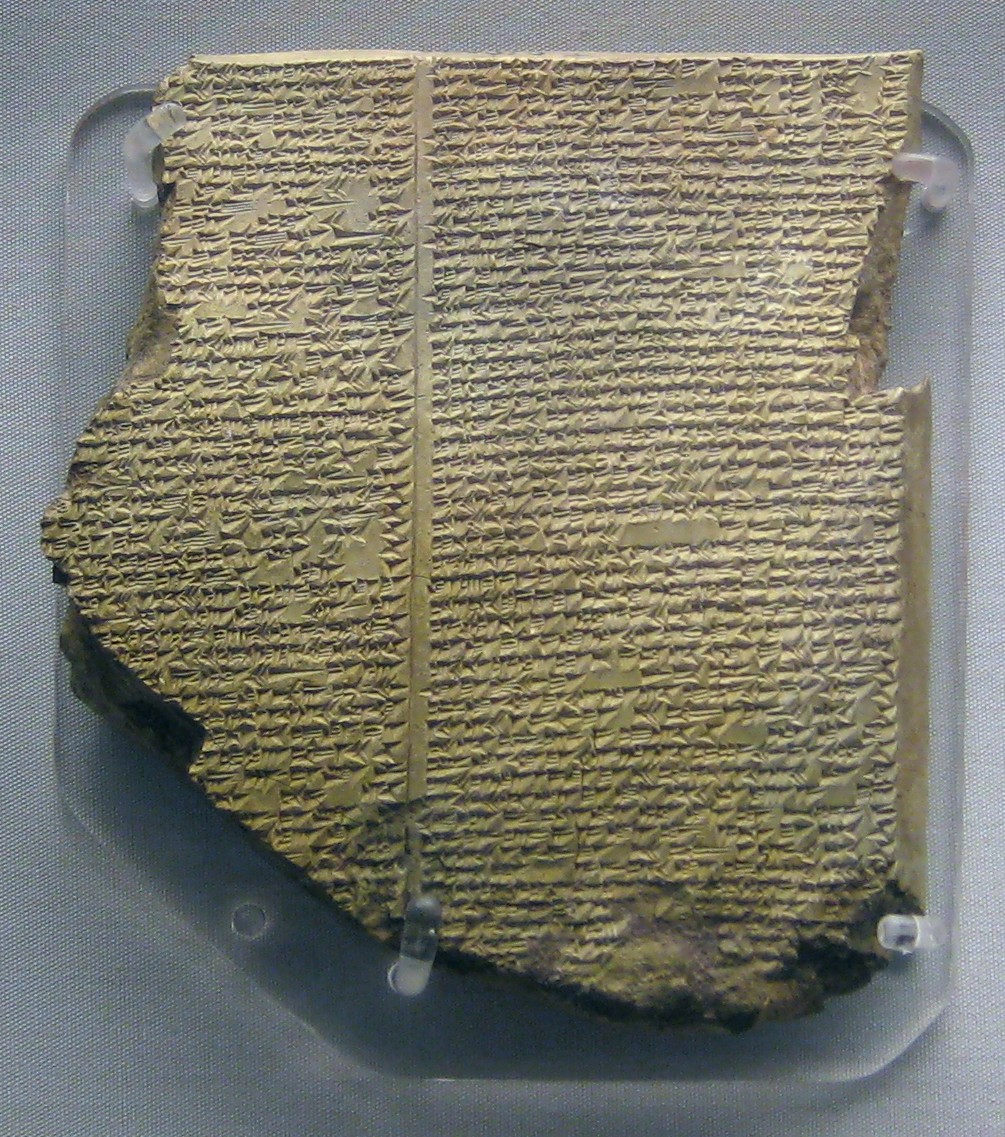
The Deluge tablet of the Epic of Gilgamesh in Akkadian. The historical Gilgamesh had died centuries earlier before his epic was recorded.

- 4.2-kiloyear event: A severe aridification event that probably lasted the entire 22nd century BC and caused the collapse of several Old World civilizations.
- 2217 BC–2193 BC: Nomadic invasions of the Mesopotamian city of Akkad.
- c. 2200 BC: Austronesians reach the Batanes Islands of the Philippine Archipelago as part of the Austronesian expansion.
- c. 2218 BC: Ancient migrants from India reach Australia and mix with Indigenous Australians.
- c. 2184 BC: Possible date for the death of Pharaoh Pepi II Neferkare of the Sixth Dynasty of Egypt, the longest reigning monarch of history with 94 years on the throne.
- c. 2184 BC: Ephemeral rule of Merenre Nemtyemsaf II in Egypt.
- c. 2184–2181 BC: Reign of Netjerkare Siptah, last pharaoh of the Sixth Dynasty of Egypt, who would later give rise to the legendary figure of Nitocris.
- c. 2181 BC: End of the Old Kingdom of Egypt and start of the First Intermediate Period, the doubtful Seventh Dynasty and the Eighth Dynasty of Egypt with Menkare (these periods may extend to c. 2160 BC or beyond). The fall of the Old Kingdom may have been caused by a conjunction of severe droughts, strong decentralization of the state and confusion following the extremely long reign of Pepi II.
- c. 2180 BC: Akkadian Empire falls under attack by the Guti (Mesopotamia), a mountain people from the northeast.
- c. 2160 BC: End of the reign of Pharaoh Neferirkare, last king of the Eighth Dynasty of Egypt. Beginning of the Ninth Dynasty, possibly after the overthrow of Neferirkare.
- c. 2160 BC: Beginning of Middle Minoan period in Crete.
- c. 2150 BC: City state of Lagash in Mesopotamia is established.
- c. 2150–2030 BC: The Epic of Gilgamesh is written in Mesopotamia in Akkadian.
- c. 2144 BC: Gudea, ruler (ensi) of Lagash, starts to reign.
- 2137 BC: A solar eclipse on 9 May and a lunar eclipse on 24 May occur and are believed to be the double eclipse that took place 23 years after the ascension of king Shulgi of Babylon by those holding to the long chronology.
- c. 2125 BC–2055 BC: "Model of a house and garden, from Thebes", Eleventh Dynasty of Egypt.
- 2124 BC: Gudea, ruler (ensi) of Lagash, dies.
- c. 2120 BC: Votive statue of Gudea from Lagash (modern Iraq) is made.
- 2119 BC–2113 BC (middle chronology): Utu-hengal, first king of the third dynasty of Ur, also called the Neo-Sumerian Empire.
- 2116 BC–2110 BC: Uruk–Gutian war.
- 2112 BC–2095 BC: Sumerian campaigns of Ur-Nammu.
