= 24th century BC =

One hundred years, from 2400 BC to 2301 BC

The 24th century BC was a century that lasted from the year 2400 BC to 2301 BC.

== Events ==
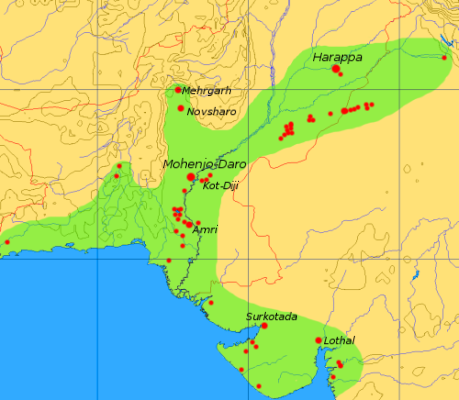
Extent and major sites of the Indus Valley civilization

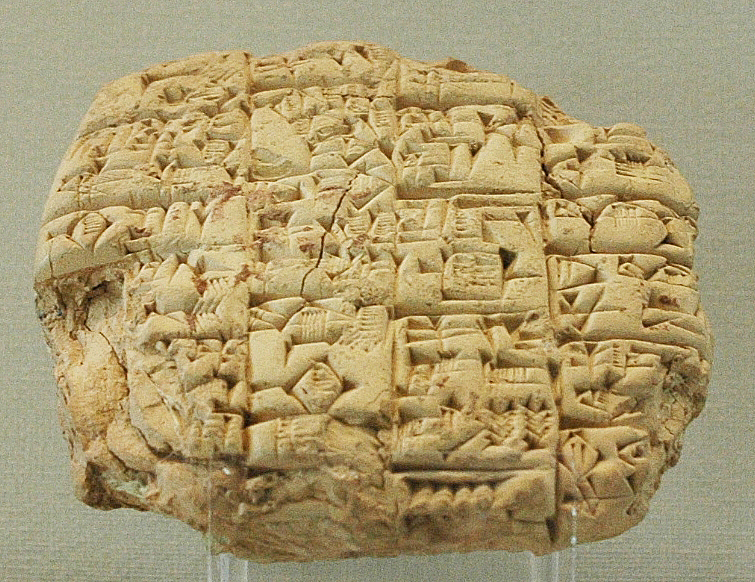
Letter in Sumerian cuneiform, c. 2400 BC, found in Girsu

- c. 2900 BC–2334 BC: Mesopotamian wars of the Early Dynastic period continue.
- c. 2400 BC–2000 BC: large painted jar with birds in the border made in the Indus River Valley civilization and is now at Museum of Fine Arts, Boston
- 2400 BC–There is archaeological evidence that the site of Assur was occupied at around this time.
- c. 2360 BC: Hekla-4 eruption.
- c. 2350 BC: The 2350 BC Middle East Anomaly (apparent comet or asteroid impact) happened.
- c. 2350 BC: End of the Early Dynastic III period in Mesopotamia.
- c. 2350 BC: Lugal-Zage-Si of Umma conquers Gu-Edin and unites Sumer as a single kingdom.
- c. 2350 BC: First destruction of the city of Mari.
- c. 2345 BC: End of Fifth Dynasty. Pharaoh Unas died.
- c. 2345 BC: Sixth Dynasty of Egypt starts (other date is 2460 BC).
- c. 2350-2300 BC: pharaohs Teti, Userkare reign, Pepi I then rules into the 23rd century BC.
- c. 2340 BC–2279 BC: Semitic chieftain Sargon of Akkad's conquest of Sumer and Mesopotamia.
- c. 2334 BC: Sargon of Akkad establishes the Akkadian Empire. His dynasty fell in c. 2154 BC.
- 2333 BC: Dangun establishes Gojoseon, the first Korean kingdom, according to Korean mythology.

== Inventions, discoveries and introductions ==
- The first official mentioning of beekeeping in Egypt.
- The first documented use of an organized courier service for the diffusion of written documents in Egypt.
- First extant evidence of written Akkadian language.

== Korean Chronology ==
In modern Korean national mythology, the character Dangun, whose mother was originally a bear, founded the state Gojoseon in 2333 BC and ruled it for about 2000 years. Some Koreans think of it as the earliest Korean state and of Dangun as the ancestor of Koreans. From 1948 until December 1961, the Republic of Korea officially reckoned years by adding 2333 to the Common Era year. The year 2333 BC and the related myth are sometimes presented matter-of-factly as history rather than mythology in Korea.

== Biblical Chronology ==
Genesis flood narrative. In Jewish and Christian history, sometime near the middle of the 24th century BC, the (known) world was flooded, covering the tops of mountains, and destroying the human and land animal populations. Only the family of a man named Noah, and one breeding pair of each animal type survived the flood by floating in/on a large wooden boat for several months.
