= 27th century BC =

One hundred years, from 2700 BC to 2601 BC

The 27th century BC was a century that lasted from the year 2700 BC to 2601 BC.

== Events ==
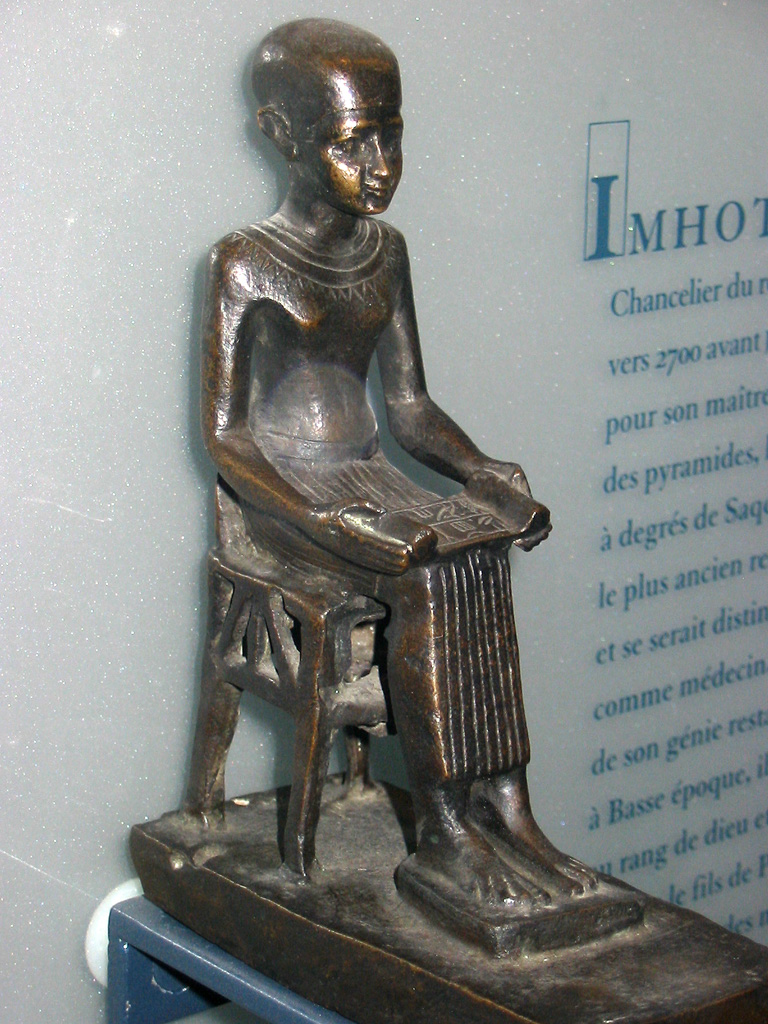
Statuette of Imhotep in the Louvre. He is the first architect and physician whose name was recorded and has survived to modern times.

- c. 2750–2600 BC: Early Dynastic II Period in Mesopotamia.
- c. 2700 BC: The beginning of statuary in Ancient Egypt, with shale and limestone statues of Khasekhemwy created in Nekhen.
- c. 2698 BC: Supposed beginning of the mythical reign of the legendary Yellow Emperor of China.
- c. 2686–2613 BC: Third Dynasty of Egypt, consisting of the reigns of Djoser, Sekhemkhet, Sanakht (Nebka), Khaba and Huni.
  - Imhotep, vizier and architect of Djoser, constructs the Pyramid of Djoser, Egypt's earliest stone edifice, in Saqqara.
- c. 2650 BC:
  - End of the Early Dynastic I Period, and the beginning of the Early Dynastic II Period in Mesopotamia.
  - Abandonment of the Mature Harappan settlement at Kalibangan in India due to the drying-up of the Ghaggar River.
  - Supposed reign of the semi-legendary Sumerian king Gilgamesh.
  - A bronze bar produced in Nippur (Sumeria) defines the cubit.
  - Earliest records of oil wrestling from Babylonia and Egypt.
- c. 2613–2494 BC: Fourth Dynasty of Egypt.
  - c. 2670–2620 BC: The reign of the pharaoh Sneferu and his vizier Nefermaat. Sneferu leads a campaign in Nubia and returns with about 7,000 prisoners, who would be employed as servants in the royal estates. Sneferu then sends an expedition to Libya which brings back 11,000 prisoners and 13,100 heads of cattle. Sneferu sends 40 ships to Byblos for the retrieval of cedar wood for the construction of ships. Under Sneferu's reign and that of his son Khufu, copper mines and turquoise quarries are developed in Sinai. The tomb of Hetepheres I, wife of Sneferu and mother of Khufu, demonstrates that cabinetry and jewelry are well-developed. A depiction of plowing painted in the tomb of Itet and Nefermaat in Meidum is the earliest testament to the technique in Africa.
