= Enheduanna =

Sumerian high priestess, c. 2300 BCE

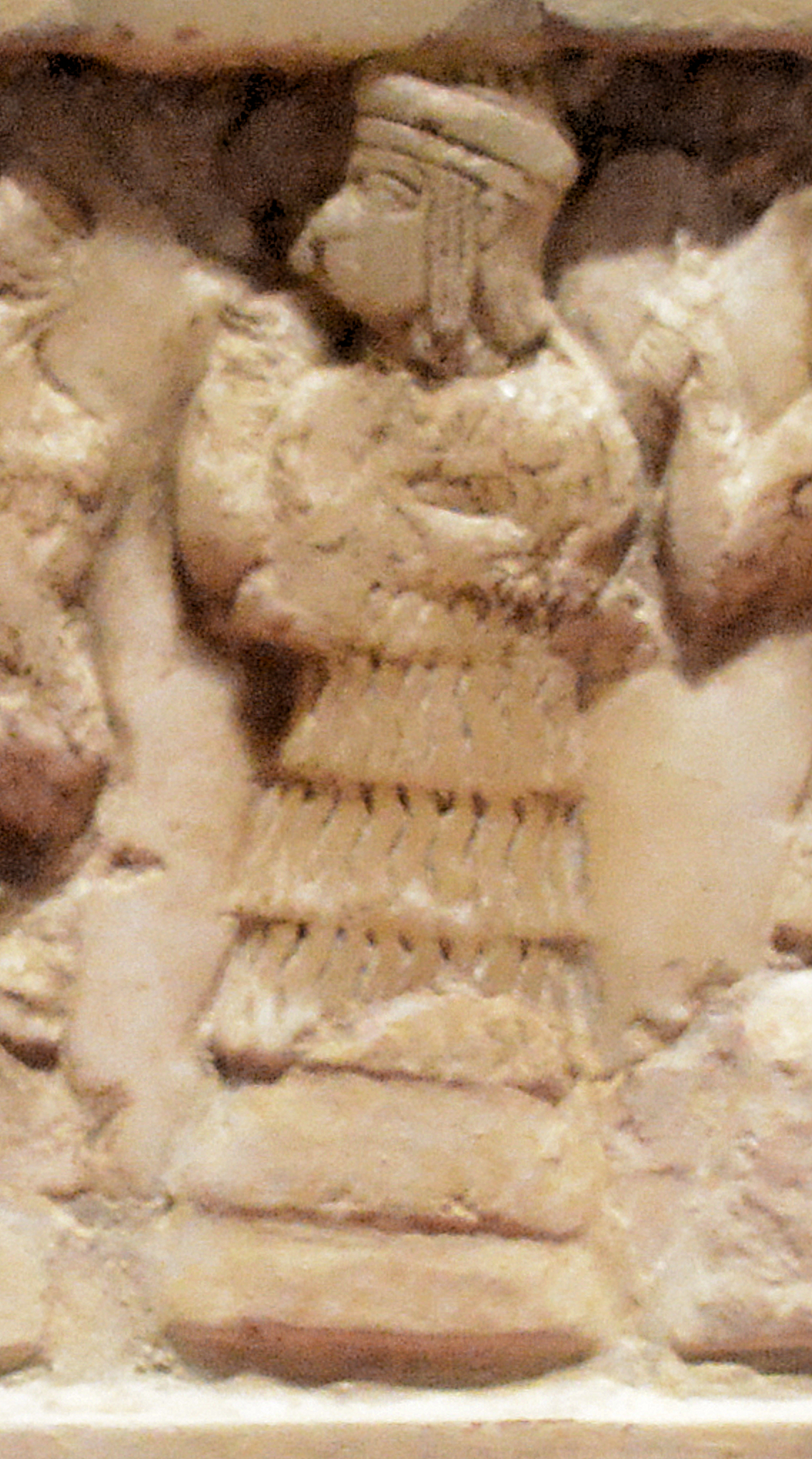
- Enheduanna, high priestess of Nanna (c. 2300 BCE)
- Occupation: EN priestess
- Parent(s): Sargon of Akkad, Tashlultum
- Writing career
- Language: Old Sumerian
- Years active: c. 2300 BCE
- Genre: Hymn
- Subjects: Nanna, Inanna
- Notable works: Exaltation of Inanna; Temple Hymns

Enheduanna (Sumerian: 𒂗𒃶𒌌𒀭𒈾 Enḫéduanna, also transliterated as Enheduana, En-he2-du7-an-na, or variants; fl. c. 2300 BCE) was the entu (high) priestess of the moon god Nanna (Sīn) in the Sumerian city-state of Ur in the reign of her father, Sargon of Akkad (r. c. 2334 – c. 2279 BCE). She was likely appointed by her father as the leader of the religious group at Ur to cement ties between the Akkadian religion of her father and the native Sumerian religion. Enheduanna has been celebrated as the earliest known named author in world history.

A number of works in Sumerian literature, such as the Exaltation of Inanna feature her as the first-person narrator, and other works, such as the Sumerian Temple Hymns may identify her as their author. However, there is considerable debate among modern Assyriologists based on linguistic and archaeological grounds as to whether or not she actually wrote or composed any of the rediscovered works that have been attributed to her. Additionally, the only manuscripts of the works attributed to her were written by scribes in the First Babylonian Empire six centuries after she lived, written in a more recent dialect of the Sumerian language than she would have spoken. These scribes may have attributed these works to her as part of the legendary narratives of the dynasty of Sargon of Akkad in later Babylonian traditions.

The cultural memory of Enheduanna and the works attributed to her were lost some time after the end of the First Babylonian Empire. Her existence was first rediscovered by modern archaeology in 1927, when Sir Leonard Woolley excavated the Giparu in the ancient city of Ur and found an alabaster disk with her name, association with Sargon of Akkad, and occupation inscribed on the reverse. References to her name were then later discovered in excavated works of Sumerian literature, which initiated investigation into her potential authorship of those works. Enheduanna's archaeological rediscovery has attracted a considerable amount of attention and scholarly debate in modern times related to her potential attribution as the first known named author. She has also received considerable attention in feminism, and the works attributed to her have also been studied as an early progenitor of classical rhetoric. English translations of her works have inspired a number of literary adaptations and representations.

== Life ==
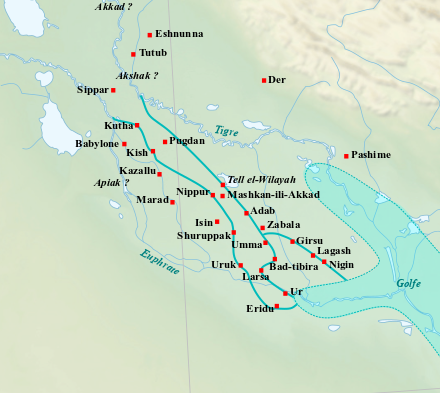
The main cities of southern Mesopotamia during the Akkadian period.

=== Sources ===
A few documents from her lifetime attest that Enheduanna was an historical person. The main one is a fragmentary disk with a partially erased inscription in her name (but known in its entirety thanks to a 19th or 18th century BC copy) and a relief probably representing her. She is absent from the administrative documentation of her time, but two cylinder seals, along with the impression of a third one found on a sealing unearthed at Ur, belong to some of her attendants.

=== A Princess from Akkad ===
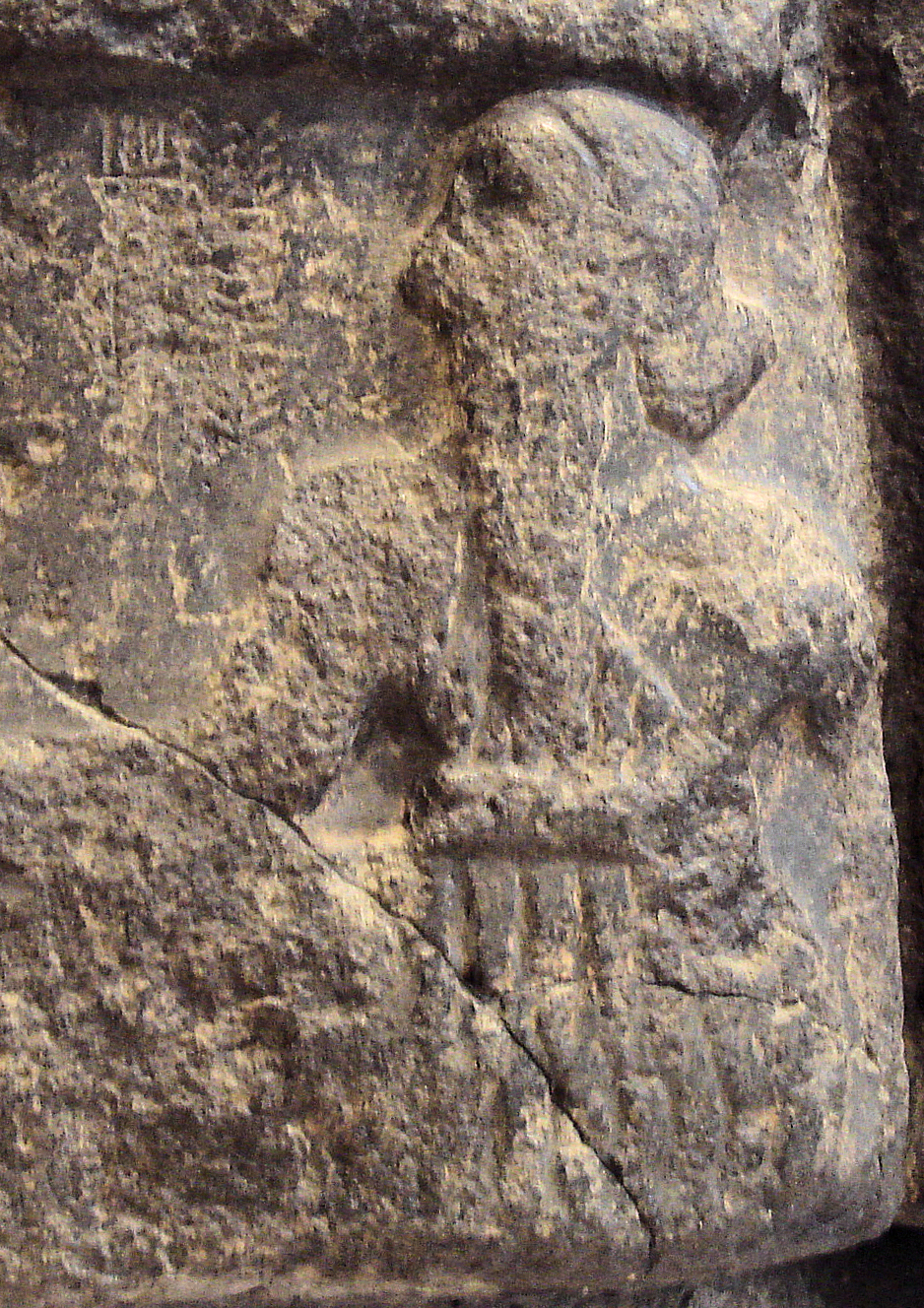
Enheduanna's father, Sargon of Akkad, founded the Akkadian Empire in the 24th century BCE

Enheduanna's father was Sargon of Akkad, founder of the Akkadian Empire, a ruler whose reign is estimated to have lasted from approximately 2334 (or 2316) to 2279/2277 BC. Sargon was a figure of obscure origins, king of the city of Akkad, that had been of no significance until then and whose precise location remains unknown: likely on the Tigris, in central Mesopotamia, between present-day Samarra and Baghdad. Around 2300 BC, he conquered the land of Sumer and succeeded in bringing all of Lower Mesopotamia under his control, something no other king had ever done before him. He then unified a group of independent city-states, transforming them into provinces. He subsequently launched military campaigns that took him farther than his predecessors: as far as central Syria, into the Zagros Mountains, and into the eastern land of Elam. He was thus an extraordinary figure who attained the status of a major figure in ancient Mesopotamia, somewhat akin to Alexander the Great in the Greco-Roman world. The inscriptions concerning Enheduanna indicate her relationship to the ruler, since she is referred to as the “daughter of Sargon.”

Sargon’s family—and thus Enheduanna’s—can be reconstructed from contemporary sources. Sargon’s wife was a woman named Tashlultum, who would thus be Enheduana’s mother (there is no indication that the kings of Akkad were polygamous, although the possibility remains). Of Sargon’s five known children, she is therefore the only daughter. Two of Sargon’s sons—and thus Enheduanna’s brothers—Rimush and Manishtushu, succeeded their father (in an uncertain order) for about twenty years. Two other brothers of Enheduanna are known from inscriptions: Su-Enlil and Ilaba'is-takal. If the hymns attributed to her are to be believed, Enheduanna was likely still alive at the beginning of the reign of the dynasty’s fourth ruler, her nephew Naram-Sin (son of Manishtushu, reigned c. 2261–2206 or 2253–2198 BC), and was involved in the events of the great rebellion that engulfed Lower Mesopotamia at an unspecified time during his reign (see below).

The hymns attributed to her could reflect the political and ideological context of the time: Enheduanna would have composed them to support the dynasty through theology. It has been suggested that she was involved in a theological innovation aimed at integrating the pantheons of the Akkadian tradition with those of the Sumerian tradition, in order to strengthen the unity of the lands ruled by the Akkadian dynasty. This would primarily involve the assimilation of the Sumerian Inanna into the Akkadian Ishtar. However, there is insufficient evidence to support the existence of such a project. The Temple Hymns, which survey the sanctuaries of the major cities conquered and unified into a single state by Sargon, may have been intended to promote the unity of the kingdom through religion. The connection between Enheduanna and the goddess Inanna/Ishtar, as expressed in the hymns she is said to have written to praise her as the greatest deity, takes on its full meaning when viewed within the ideological context of the Akkadian period, since the Sargonic dynasty regularly placed itself under the auspices of the goddess.

=== Appointment as Priestess of Ur ===
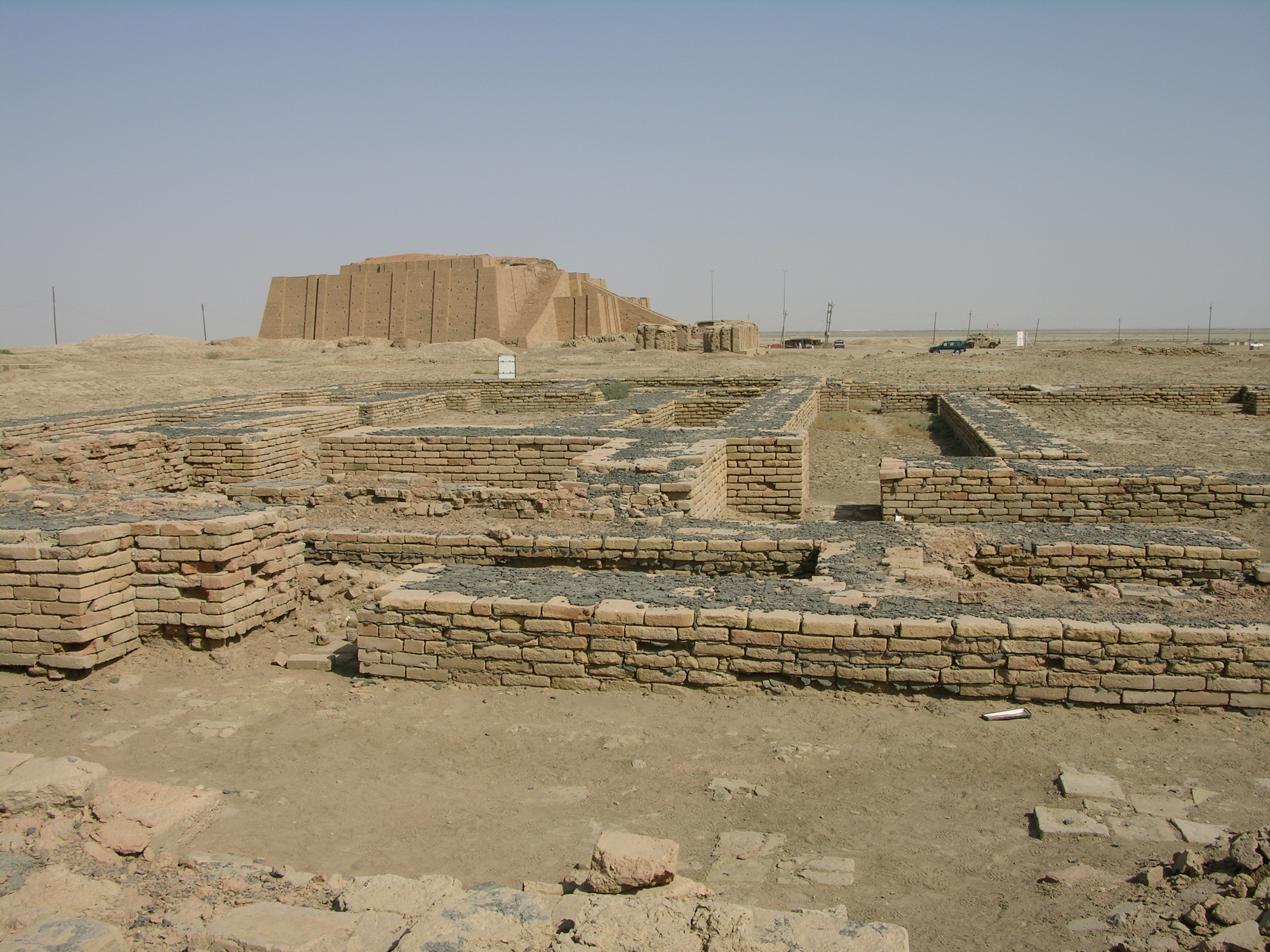
The ruins of the Giparu (front), the temple complex where Enheduanna served as an EN priestess

At some unspecified time, her father (or one of her brothers) appointed her high priestess of Nanna, the Moon God (Sin in Akkadian), tutelary deity of the city of Ur. This position bears the Sumerian name en (enum in Akkadian), which, however, is not attested for Enheduanna’s time. It was the most important position within the hierarchy of the Sumerian clergy, often carrying heavy political weight..

It is not certain that this position existed in earlier periods. It may have been created by Sargon. It is, however, possible that this position was already held by women of royal rank. In any case, it is certain that other daughters of kings succeeded Enheduanna, beginning with her own grandniece, the daughter of Naram-Sin named Enmenanna. During the Third Dynasty of Ur (21st century BC), several princesses in turn attained this position,, and again during the subsequent Isin-Larsa period (19th-18th century BC). In the 6th century BC, King Nabonidus of Babylon revived this tradition several centuries after it had fallen into disuse, appointing his daughter Ennigaldi-Nanna.

It is likely that this high priestesses, who bear similar names beginning with en (meaning “high-priestess” or “lord”) and often ending with an (meaning “Heaven”; which can also refer to the god An), were given a new name upon assuming their office. "Enheduanna" would therefore not have been the princess’s birth name. Enheduanna's name is usually translated as "The high-priestess is the Ornament of Heaven." "Ornament of Heaven" (he_{2}-du_{7}-an-na) is also an epithet of Nanna.

Other known cases from the Akkadian period (and the Third Dynasty of Ur) show that high priestesses were chosen through an oracular procedure, as was usually the case for major liturgical offices.

Enheduanna was probably installed in the building within the god Nanna’s sanctuary known as the Giparu, since this is where the high priestesses of the god Nanna resided in later periods (and where her alabaster disk was found). But its levels of the Akkadian period could not be investigated during excavations, as it underwent significant alterations in subsequent periods.

=== The Disk of Enheduanna ===
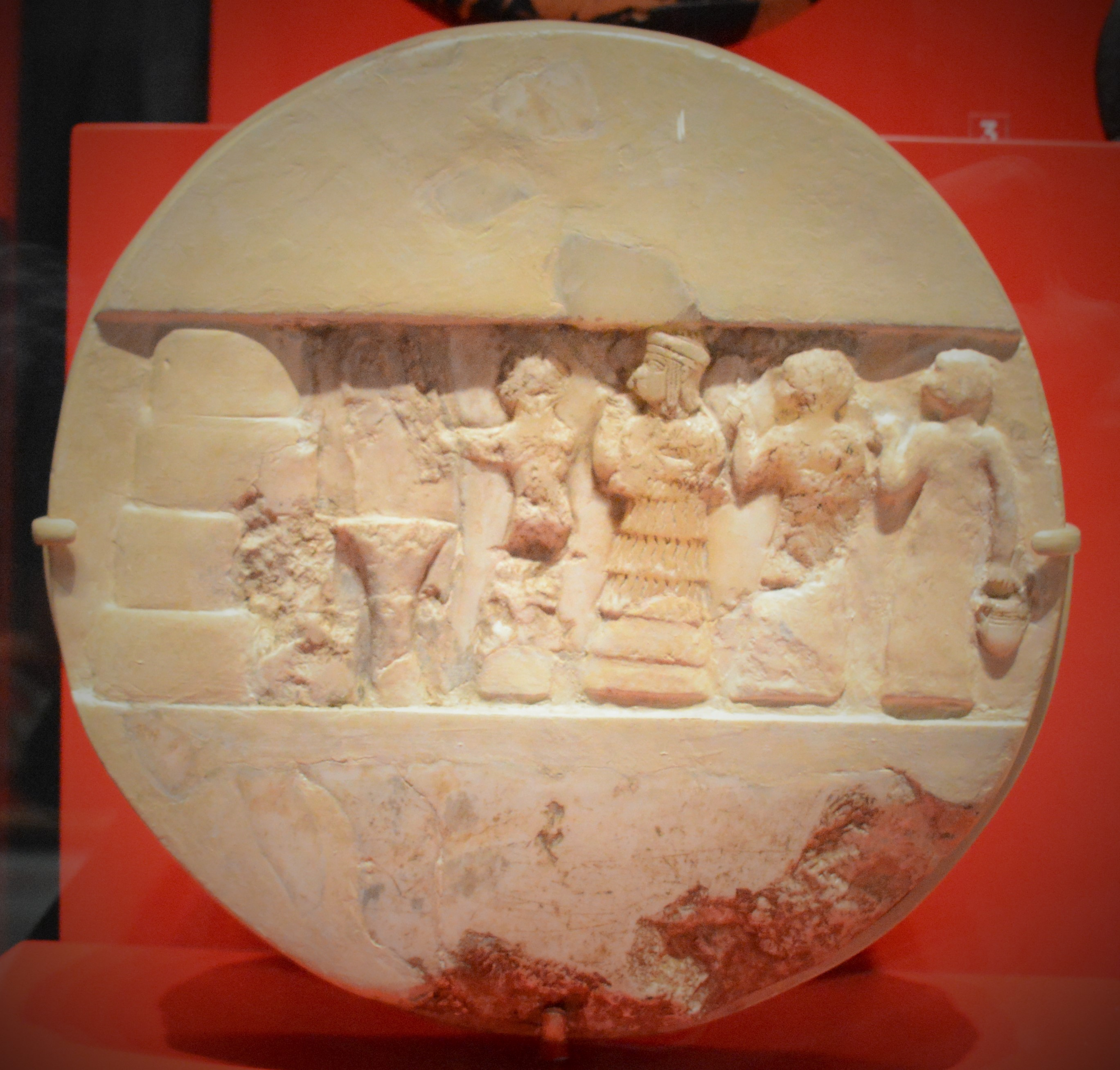
The Disk of Enheduanna, discovered by Leonard Woolley shows the high priestess standing in worship as what has been interpreted as a nude male figure pours a libation

The main source regarding Enheduanna’s role as high priestess of the god Nanna is an alabaster disk, 25.6 cm in diameter and 7 cm thick, unearthed at Ur in the Giparu. It features a bas-relief and an inscription on the reverse; although the latter is largely erased, it can be reconstructed thanks to a copy made on a tablet in the 19th century BC (assuming that copy indeed corresponds to this object). It was discovered 1927, as part of excavations at Ur directed by the British archaeologist Sir Leonard Woolley, shattered into several pieces, which has since been heavily (fancifully?) restored.

The bas-relief consists of a central frieze depicting a priestess accompanied by three male figures.Irene Winter states that "given the placement and attention to detail" of the central figure, "she has been identified as Enheduanna". She is depicted wearing a fringed tunic and a turban. The figure on the far left is a naked priest (possibly the one referred to in texts by the title lagar), who is pouring a libation onto an altar—an element largely worn away on the disk. The priestess is followed by two other, poorly preserved figures—likely officiating assistants—holding objects that resemble a musical instrument and a vessel (the one farthest right might be entirely a modern 'restoration'). A stepped structure, sometimes identified as a ziggurat, appears on the left side of the scene.

The inscription (incorporating reconstructions based on a copy tablet) reads: "Enheduana, the zirru-priestess of Nanna, spouse of Nanna, daughter of Sargon, King of the World (or "of Kish"), built a pedestal in the temple of Inanna-ZAZA and named it: 'dais, table of Heaven (or "the god An").'"

Inanna-ZAZA is an aspect of the goddess Inanna/Ishtar that, apart from this instance, is known only from Mari in Syria. The mention of the goddess, instead of the god Nanna, finds an echo in the hymns to Inanna attributed to Enheduanna: it seems that her personal devotion was directed more toward this goddess (regarded as the protector of the Akkadian dynasty) than toward her divine spouse.

The disc is now a major artifact in the Middle East Galleries at the Penn Museum. Museum staff have shown the disc to the museum's special guests, such as Neil Gaiman. Together with other items related to the priestess, it went on display for the 2022-2023 exhibit centered on her, She Who Wrote: Enheduanna and Women of Mesopotamia.

=== Religious Role ===
The image and the text of the disk provide several essential pieces of information regarding the role of the high priestess of the god Nanna: she is considered his terrestrial spouse (dam), with the (Akkadian) title zirru being used as an epithet for his divine wife, the goddess Ningal.

On the other hand, there is no indication on the disk that she plays an active role in the ritual, as she is not the one performing the libation. Hymns attributed to Enheduanna, along with other sources concerning the high priestesses of Nanna from later periods, indicate that they participated in rituals. Their appointment in office was marked by an ordination ritual, a rite of passage signifying their entry into the sanctuary. The hymns to Nanna that mention Enheduanna may have been texts composed for this very occasion. They refer to purification rites and an enthronement through which she became the god’s earthly wife..

Once in office, a high priestess would participate in the management and maintenance of the sanctuary, as well as in routine cultic rituals, including those dedicated to the protection of the king. Enheduanna’s hymns show that she took part in purification rites and prepared and presented food offerings. She was also probably expected to take part in the god’s major festivals, and possibly in rites such as the "sacred marriage".

The cylinder seals of her attendants allow to identify: her hairdresser, Ilum-palil; her steward or majordomo, Adda; and a scribe whose name cannot be reconstructed due to a break in the inscription. The presence of a steward or majordomo suggests that she was granted an estate to support her financially—a common practice for individuals of royal rank or those holding cultic offices.

=== Political Role ===
Irene J. Winter, among others, states that Sargon, having conquered Ur, likely sought to "consolidate the Akkadian dynasty's links with the traditional Sumerian past in the important cult and political center of Ur." The aim of Enheduanna's appointment as priestess was to consolidate the dominance of the new Akkadian regime in the land of Sumer—which had recently been conquered—by installing a member of the royal family in one of its major sanctuaries. The practice of consecrating a high priestess to Nanna follows a logic that has been compared to that of diplomatic marriages between royal families: indeed, known Akkadian princesses were either consecrated to a god, or married to foreign kings.

This suggest that Enheduanna was not merely a 'pawn' stationed in Ur to serve the kings of Akkad; rather, she likely played a significant role in her own time. She possessed not only a form of political authority as a member of the ruling dynasty, but also religious and spiritual authority as the priestess-consort of the god Nanna—potentially even a 'theological' role, given the hymns she is believed to have composed. Furthermore, she held symbolic authority over the community of the city of Ur—of which she served as an embodiment—as well as economic power, stemming from her control over what was likely a substantial landed estate.

But the other side of the coin is that, on the eyes of her contemporaries, she was likely seen as embodiying "the foreign representative of imperial power." The Akkadian power was impopular among many in the Sumerian south, and faced several revolts. It is therefore not surprising that Enheduanna has also been remembered for having faced one of these perilous situations, during the reign of her nephew Naram-Sin.

=== Rebellion of Lugal-Ane ===
Toward the end of the reign of Sargon's grandson Naram-Sin, numerous former city-states rebelled against the Akkadian central power. From hints in the song Nin me šara ("the Exaltation of Inana"), the events can be reconstructed from the point of view of Enheduanna: a certain Lugal-Ane came to power in the city of Ur, who as the new ruler invoked the legitimacy of the city god Nanna. Lugal-Ane is probably identical with a Lugal-An-na or Lugal-An-né, who is mentioned in ancient Babylonian literary texts about the war as king of Ur. Apparently Lugal-Ane demanded that the high priestess and consort of the moon god Enheduanna had to confirm his assumption of power. En-ḫedu-anna, as representative of the Sargonic dynasty, refused, whereupon she was suspended from her office and expelled from the city. The mention of the temple E-ešdam-ku indicates that she then found refuge in the city of Ĝirsu. In this exile, she composed the song Nin me šara, the performance of which was intended to persuade the goddess Inanna (as Ištar the patron goddess of her dynasty) to intervene on behalf of the Akkadian empire.

King Naram-Sin succeeded in putting down the rebellion of Lugal-Ane and other kings and restored the Akkadian central authority for the remaining years of his reign. Probably Enheduanna then returned to her office in the city of Ur. After her death, she was likely succedded as high priestess of Ur by another Akkadian princess, Enmenanna, daughter of Naram-Sin.

== Attributed works ==
Two of the works attributed to Enheduanna, The Exaltation of Inanna and Inanna and Ebih have survived in numerous manuscripts due to their presence in the Decad, an advanced scribal curriculum in the Old Babylonian period of the 18th and 17th centuries BCE. They then served as models for (advanced) Sumerian language learning, and thus are known from copies recovered during archaeological excavations of ancient schools (primarily at Nippur and Ur).

The fact that Enheduanna is explicitly named in three texts as their author is a rarity in ancient Mesopotamian literature, a body of work that is mostly anonymous, or at the very least regarded as the product of divine revelation and thus a creation of the gods. From an ancient perspective, it is possible that Enheduanna—in connection with her role as a priestess—was primarily viewed as a vessel used by the gods (notably the goddess Ningal) to create hymns that were then performed by humans.

Furthermore, although she is not the only female author known within the Mesopotamian literary tradition, the fact that she was a woman—in a Mesopotamian scholarly milieu that was overwhelmingly male—makes her profile all the more atypical. It is, to say the least, remarkable that the scholars of ancient Mesopotamia honored this woman as a respected writer, ensuring her name was commemorated whenever her works were copied—a practice that was not otherwise standard for them. Around one hundred copies of The Exaltation of Inanna are known to exist, which is a significant number (making it a sort of "classic" of Sumerian literature).

The first person to connect the disk and seals with literary works excavated in Nippur was Adam Falkenstein, who observed that the Temple Hymns and two hymns to Inanna: The Exaltation of Inanna and another Hymn to Inanna (at the time not yet reconstructed) contained references to Enheduanna. Falkenstein suggested that this might be evidence of Enheduanna's authorship, but acknowledged that the hymns are only known from the later Old Babylonian period and that more work would need to be done constructing and analyzing the received texts before any conclusions could be made. In 1989, Westenholz suggested that Inanna and Ebih and two other hymns, to Nanna at Ur, might also have been written by her.

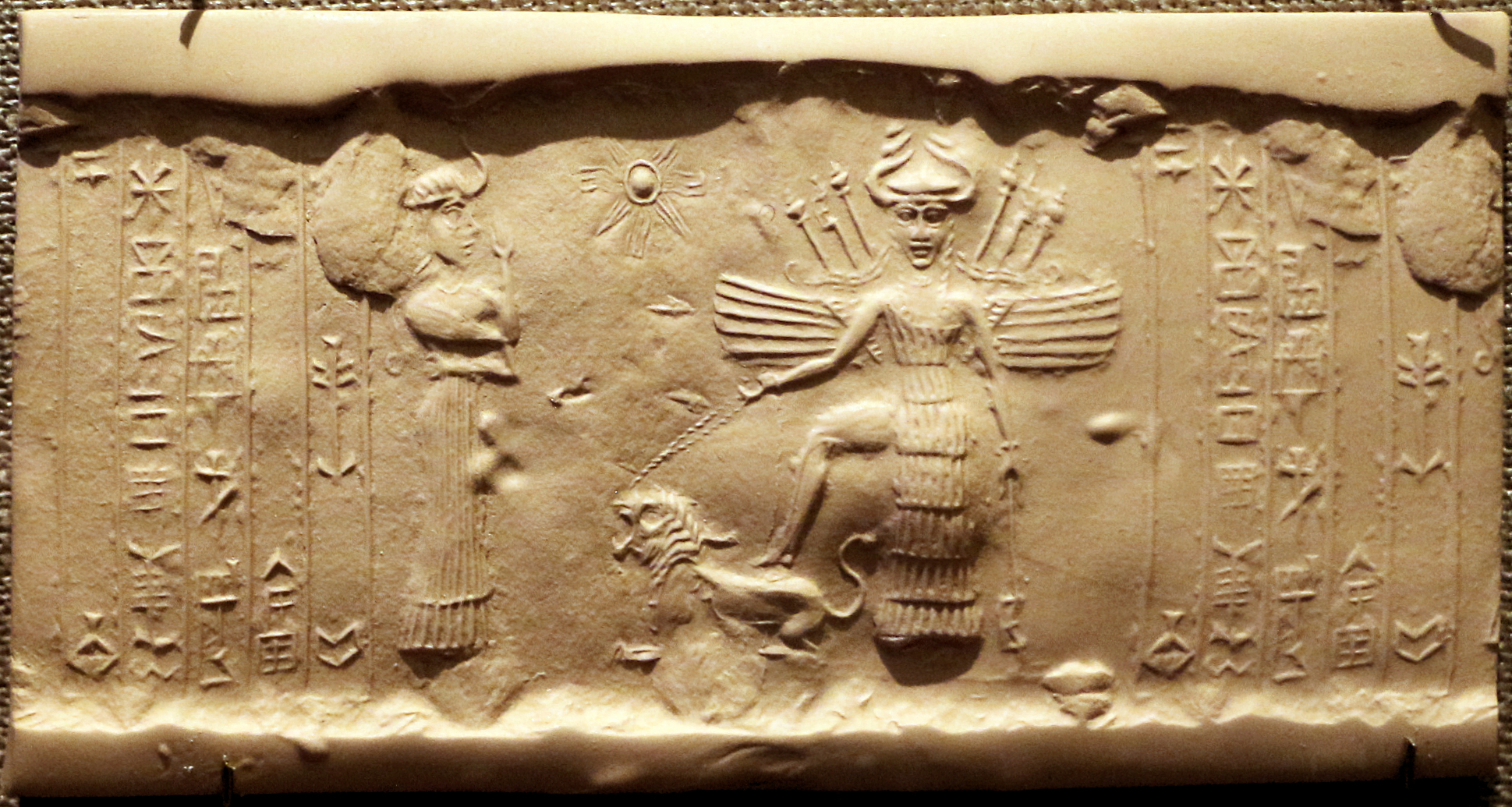
Ancient Akkadian cylinder seal depicting Inanna, the subject of three hymns attributed to Enheduanna, resting her foot on the back of a lion, c. 2334–2154 BCE

=== Hymns dedicated to Inanna ===
Enheduanna was credited by scribes of the Old Babylonian period with composing two first-person hymns in which the priestess celebrates the goddess Inanna/Ishtar: The Exaltation of Inanna and an Hymn to Inanna. The attribution of a third hymn, Inanna and Ebih, which has a style and themes close to those of the previous ones, is disputed because the priestess’s name does not appear in it.

==== The Exaltation of Inanna ====
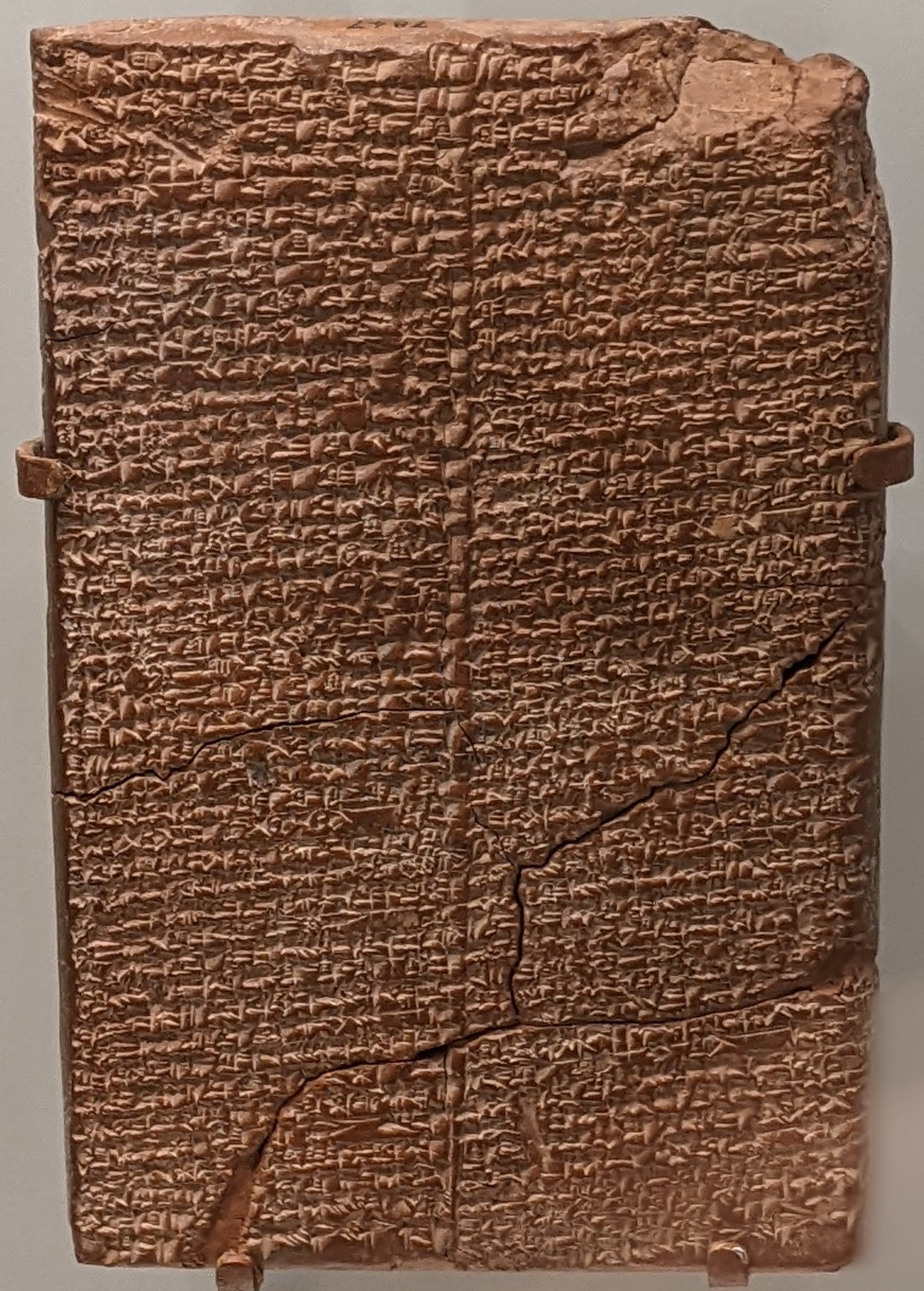
The Exaltation of Inanna, Old Babylonian copy from Nippur. Penn Museum.

Nin me šara ("Mistress of the innumerable me", "Lady of Myriad Divine Powers"; modern translations also include The Exaltation of Inana / Inana B) is a hymn to the goddess Inanna of 154 lines. According to Claus Wilcke, the text "belongs to the most difficult that exists in the literary tradition in Sumerian". The first complete edition of Nin me šara was produced by Hallo/van Dijk in 1968. A fundamentally new edition based on a broader textual foundation as well as recent linguistic research and textual criticism was published by Annette Zgoll in 1997, with further improvements in Zgoll 2014 and 2021.

The work refers to the rebellion of Lugal-Ane and Enheduanna's exile. It starts with an invocation to Inanna, and a self-introduction of the poetess "I am the High priestess. I am Enheduanna", then a lament imploring the goddess to improve her fate. Probably composed in exile in Ĝirsu, the song is intended to persuade the goddess Inanna to intervene in the conflict in favor of Enheduanna and the Sargonian dynasty. To reach this, the text constructs a myth: An, the king of the gods, endows the goddess Inanna with divine powers and has her execute his judgment on all the cities of Sumer, making her herself the ruler of the land and most powerful of all the gods. When now the city of Ur rebels against her rule, Inanna passes her judgment over it and has it executed by Nanna, the city god of Ur and her father. Inanna has thus become the mistress of heaven and earth alike – and thus empowered to enforce her will even over the originally superior gods (An and Nanna), which results in the destruction of Ur and Lugal-Ane.

I, En-ḫedu-ana, will recite a prayer to you. To you, holy Inana, I shall give free vent to my tears like sweet beer! I shall say to her {"Your decision!" or "Greetings!"} Do not be anxious about Ašimbabbar (Nanna). In connection with the purification rites of holy An, Lugal-Ane has altered everything of his, and has stripped An of the E-ana. He has not stood in awe of the greatest deity. He has turned that temple, whose attractions were inexhaustible, whose beauty was endless, into a destroyed temple. While he entered before me as if he was a partner, really he approached out of envy.

The hymn also instructs singers to repeat it every day, ensuring its transmission: "Since it was full, too full for me, great exalted lady, I have recited this song for you. May a singer repeat to you at noon that which was recited to you at dead of night: "Because of your captive spouse, because of your captive child, your rage is increased, your heart unassuaged."

==== Hymn to Inanna ====
Also called The Great-Hearted Mistress or The Stout-Hearted Mistress (incipit in-nin ša-gur-ra), the Hymn to Inanna (or Inanna C), which is only partially preserved in a fragmentary form, is outlined by Black et al. as containing three parts: an introductory section (lines 1–90) emphasizing Inanna's "martial abilities"; a long, middle section (lines 91–218) that serves as a direct address to Inanna, listing her many positive and negative powers, and asserting her superiority over other deities, and a concluding section (219–274) narrated by Enheduanna that exists in a very fragmentary form. Just like the previous one, it contains a self-introduction "I am Enheduanna."

The great-hearted mistress, the impetuous lady, proud among the Anuna gods and pre-eminent in all lands, the great daughter of Suen, exalted among the Great Princes (a name of the Igigi gods) , the magnificent lady who gathers up the divine powers of heaven and earth and rivals great An, is mightiest among the great gods -- she makes their verdicts final. The Anuna gods crawl before her august word whose course she does not let An know; he dare not proceed against her command. She changes her own action, and no one knows how it will occur. She makes perfect the great divine powers, she holds a shepherd's crook, and she is their magnificent pre-eminent one. She is a huge shackle clamping down upon the gods of the Land. Her great awesomeness covers the great mountain and levels the roads.

Black et al. surmise that the fragmentary nature of the concluding section makes it unclear whether Enheduanna composed the hymn, the concluding section was a later addition, or that her name was added to the poem later in the Old Babylonian period from "a desire to attribute it to her". They also note that the concluding section also appears to reference "some historical events which cannot be elucidated." This poem also contains a potential reference to the events described in Inanna and Ebih, which has led Westenholz to suggest that that poem may have been written by Enheduanna as well.

The first English translation of this work was by Sjöberg in 1975.

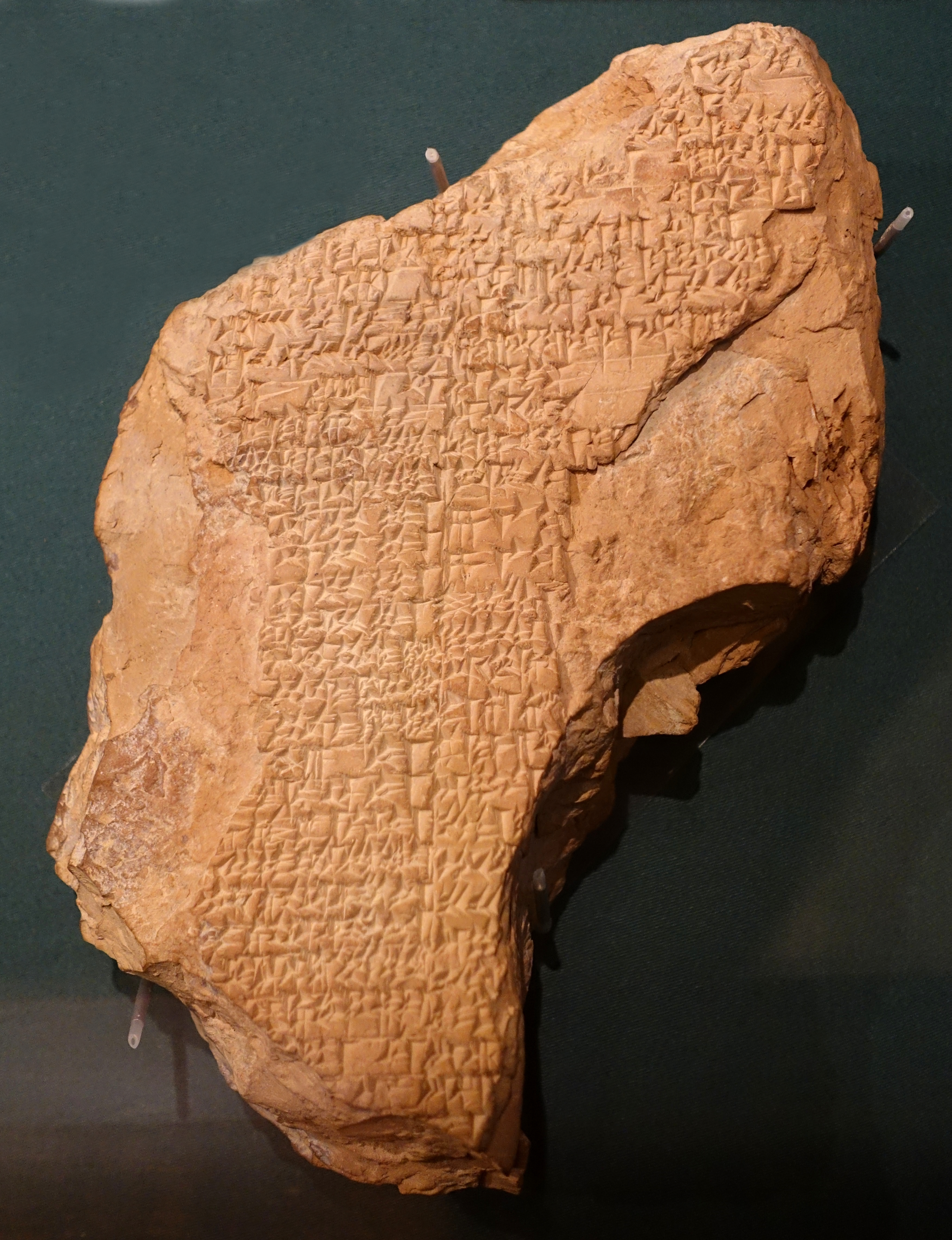
Sumerian clay tablet inscribed with the text of the poem Inanna and Ebih

==== Inanna and Ebih ====
The hymn Inanna and Ebih (incipit in-nin me-huš-a) is characterized by Black et al. as "Inanna in warrior mode." The poem starts with a hymn to Inanna as "lady of battle" (lines 1–24) then shifts to a narration by Inanna herself in the first person (lines 25–52), where she describes the revenge she wants to take on the mountains of Ebih for their refusal to bow to her.

Inanna then visits the sky god An and requests his assistance (lines 53–111), but An doubts Inanna's ability to take revenge (lines 112–130). This causes Inanna to fly into a rage and attack Ebih (lines 131–159). Inanna then recounts how she overthrew Ebih (lines 160–181) and the poem ends with a praise of Inanna (lines 182–184). The "rebel lands" of Ebih that are overthrown in the poem have been identified with the Jebel Hamrin mountain range in modern Iraq. Black et al. describe these lands as "home to the nomadic, barbarian tribes who loom large in Sumerian literature as forces of destruction and chaos" that sometimes need to be "brought under divine control".

This hymn is not explicitly attributed to Enheduanna, and does not mention her name anywhere. But it is grouped with the two preceding hymns in ancient tablets that serve as catalogs of works. Some scholars attribute its composition to her, because of their similarities with her other poems; furthermore, the conflict in question is mentioned in the Hymn to Inanna, and it may refer to the wars waged by the kings of Akkad against the highland regions located to the northeast of their realm. However, this view is hardly unanimous.

=== Temple hymns ===
The hymns have been reconstructed from 37 tablets from Ur and Nippur, most of which date to the Ur III and Old Babylonian periods. Each hymn is dedicated to a particular deity from the Sumerian pantheon and a city with which the deity was associated, and may have helped to create syncreticism between the native Sumerian religion and the Semitic religion of the Akkadian Empire.

Four manuscripts of this work have preserved their ending, a "subscript" or colophon of two lines pointing to Enheduanna’s creative role in their composition (though perhaps drawing upon pre-existing works): a colophon stating that "The compiler of the tablets was En-hedu-ana" and another adding "My king, something has been created that no one has created before." Rather than their author, Enheduanna might be their composer or more accurately their compiler, reworking older material transmitted on cuneiform tablets, gathering separate hymns in order to create a unified work, something that would fit the practices of the scribal milieux of ancient Mesopotamia.

The first translation of the collection into English was by Åke W. Sjöberg, who also argued that the colophon appear to credit her with composition of the preceding text. However, Black showed that in the majority of manuscripts, the line following this colophon, which contains the line count for the 42nd and final hymn, demonstrates that the preceding two lines are part of the 42nd hymn. Black concludes that: "At most... it might be reasonable to accept a claim for (Enheduanna)'s authorship or editorship" for only Hymn 42, the final hymn in the collection.

Moreover, some of these poems, such as hymn 9, addressed to the temple of the deified king Sulgi from the later Third Dynasty of Ur, cannot have been written by Enheduanna or anyone in the Akkadian Empire, showing that the collection may have gained additional poems over time.

=== Hymns dedicated to Nanna ===
The two hymns dedicated to Nanna are labeled by Westenholz as Hymn of Praise to Ekisnugal and Nanna on [the] Assumption of En-ship (incipit e ugim e-a) and Hymn of Praise of Enheduanna (incipit lost). The second hymn is very fragmentary. Both mention the name of Enheduanna, in connection with the god she actually served. The copy of the second one, dating from the Ur III period (21st century BC), is the oldest surviving manuscript mentioning her. Their attribution to Enheduanna is highly difficult to prove, primarily because these hymns are known only in an overly incomplete state.

== Authorship debate ==
The question of Enheduanna's authorship of poems has been subject to significant debate. None of the copies of the works attributed to her date from her lifetime. The vast majority of them are from the Old Babylonian period, mainly from the 18th century BC (the same period during which the inscription on her disc was copied), more than five centuries after her death, in the language and script of this period. But it is atypical since at this time virtually no literary texts were attributed to an author. They also contain various references about her.

While Hallo and Åke Sjöberg were the first to definitively assert Enheduanna's authorship of the works attributed to her, other Assyriologists including Miguel Civil and Jeremy Black have put forth arguments rejecting or doubting Enheduanna's authorship. Civil has raised the possibility that "Enheduanna" refers not to the name, but instead the station of EN-priestess that the daughter of Sargon of Akkad held.

For the Inanna and Nanna poems, Black et al. argue that at best, all of the manuscript sources date from at least six centuries after when she would have lived, and they were found in scribal settings, not ritual ones, and that "surviving sources show no traces of Old Sumerian... making it impossible to posit what that putative original might have looked like." They also suggest that "perhaps Enheduanna has survived in scribal literature" due to the "continuing fascination with the dynasty of her father Sargon of Akkad". However, ascribing her popularity to her father appears to be an example of Androcentrism bias in archaeology, given Enheduanna’s enduring position as the first credited author in human history.

None of the works attributed to him would, therefore, be from his own hand. At worst, they would be later creations—and thus apocryphal—that were attributed to her in order to grant them an eminent status. At best, they would be poems composed for her by one of the scribes in her service. This solution would suffice to explain the fact that the Exaltation of Inanna presents itself as an autobiography containing elements that indeed point to the context of the Akkadian period. In that case, they would still have been profoundly altered subsequently, to the point of losing the characteristics of their original language.

Despite these concerns, Hallo says that there is still little reason to doubt Enheduanna's authorship of these works. Hallo, responding to Miguel Civil, not only still maintains Enheduanna's authorship of all of the works attributed to her, but rejects "excess skepticism" in Assyriology as a whole, and noting that "rather than limit the inferences they draw from it" other scholars should consider that "the abundant textual documentation from Mesopotamia... provides a precious resource for tracing the origins and evolution of countless facets of civilization."

Other specialists in Sumerian literature who have translated and studied the works of Enheduanna, such as Joan Goodnick Westenholz and Annette Zgoll, concur that the priestess is indeed the author of the works in question. This position has gained prominence over time.

Specialists on the Akkadian period, such as Aage Westenholz and Benjamin Foster, also tend to support this view. The existence of the princess-priestess is confirmed by sources from the Akkadian era. Furthermore, given that these hymns possess a distinct and individual style, there is no compelling reason to deny Enheduanna authorship of these texts—especially since the Mesopotamian scholarly tradition itself attributes them to her (something it almost never does). While the extant copies of her works are not the original versions, this is easily explained: the anachronisms identified point to later additions or alterations resulting from repeated copying, and the texts were adapted to the language of the periods in which they were transcribed. This is not an anomaly, as Mesopotamian literary works were subject to evolution over time, and often took on a composite character.

According to Charles Halton and Saana Svärd: "Most scholars think that she did have a formative role in the composition of these hymns but that, similar to almost every literary text in the ancient world, later additions were included as the text was recopied. Regardless of whether or not Enheduana herself wrote these compositions, later authors believed she did."

Summarizing the debate, Paul A. Delnero, professor of Assyriology at Johns Hopkins University, remarks that "the attribution is exceptional, and against the practice of anonymous authorship during the period; it almost certainly served to invest these compositions with an even greater authority and importance than they would have had otherwise, rather than to document historical reality".

== Modern rediscovery ==
The rediscovery of Enheduanna’s texts by scholars specialized in Sumerian literature drew attention to this potential first author in history. Her name had been known since 1927, when a text bearing her name was unearthed in Ur, but it was not until further progress was made in deciphering Sumerian texts that her literary role was taken into consideration. In 1950, Adam Falkenstein was the first to devote an article to her. Then, beginning in the late 1960s, translations of her hymns by J.J.A. van Djik and William W. Hallo (Exaltation of Inanna) and Åke W. Sjöberg and E. Bergmann (Temple Hymns and Hymn to Inanna) provided the foundation for the rediscovery of this forgotten figure.

In 1978, American anthropologist Marta Weigle introduced Enheduanna to an audience of feminist scholars as "the first known author in world literature" with her introductory essay "Women as Verbal Artists: Reclaiming the Sisters of Enheduanna". She was the first to turn her into a feminist symbol—a figure standing up against a patriarchal order—who was said to have taken the title of “oldest female author” away from Sappho. Subsequently, non-academic translations of Enheduanna’s works were published with the aim of proving that she was indeed their author. This implies that she was capable of influencing the events and ideology of her time, and thus raises questions about women’s agency in ancient societies dominated by men.

Enheduanna has also been analyzed as an early rhetorical theorist. Roberta Binkley finds evidence in The Exaltation of Inanna of invention and classical modes of persuasion. Hallo, building on the work of Binkley, compares the sequence of the Hymn to Inanna, Inanna and Ebih, and the Exaltation of Inanna to the biblical Book of Amos, and considers these both evidence of "the birth of rhetoric in Mesopotamia."

Although she remains a relatively unknown figure compared to other ancient Greek or Latin authors, Enheduanna has started to become a figure of reference in her homeland, present-day Iraq, in connection with the events that affected that country in the 2000s, for example, by the poet Amal al-Jubouri.

Since 2015, an crater on the planet Mercury has been named Enheduanna in her honor.

She was the central figure of an exhibition dedicated to women in Mesopotamia, which took place between October 2022 and February 2023 at the Morgan Library in New York City, and helped raise awareness among a wider audience of her status as the first known female author in history.

== See also ==
- Enheduanna (crater)
- List of female poets
- List of archaeologically attested women from the ancient Mediterranean region
