= Architecture of Mesopotamia =

Western Asian architectural style

Architecture of Mesopotamia civilization
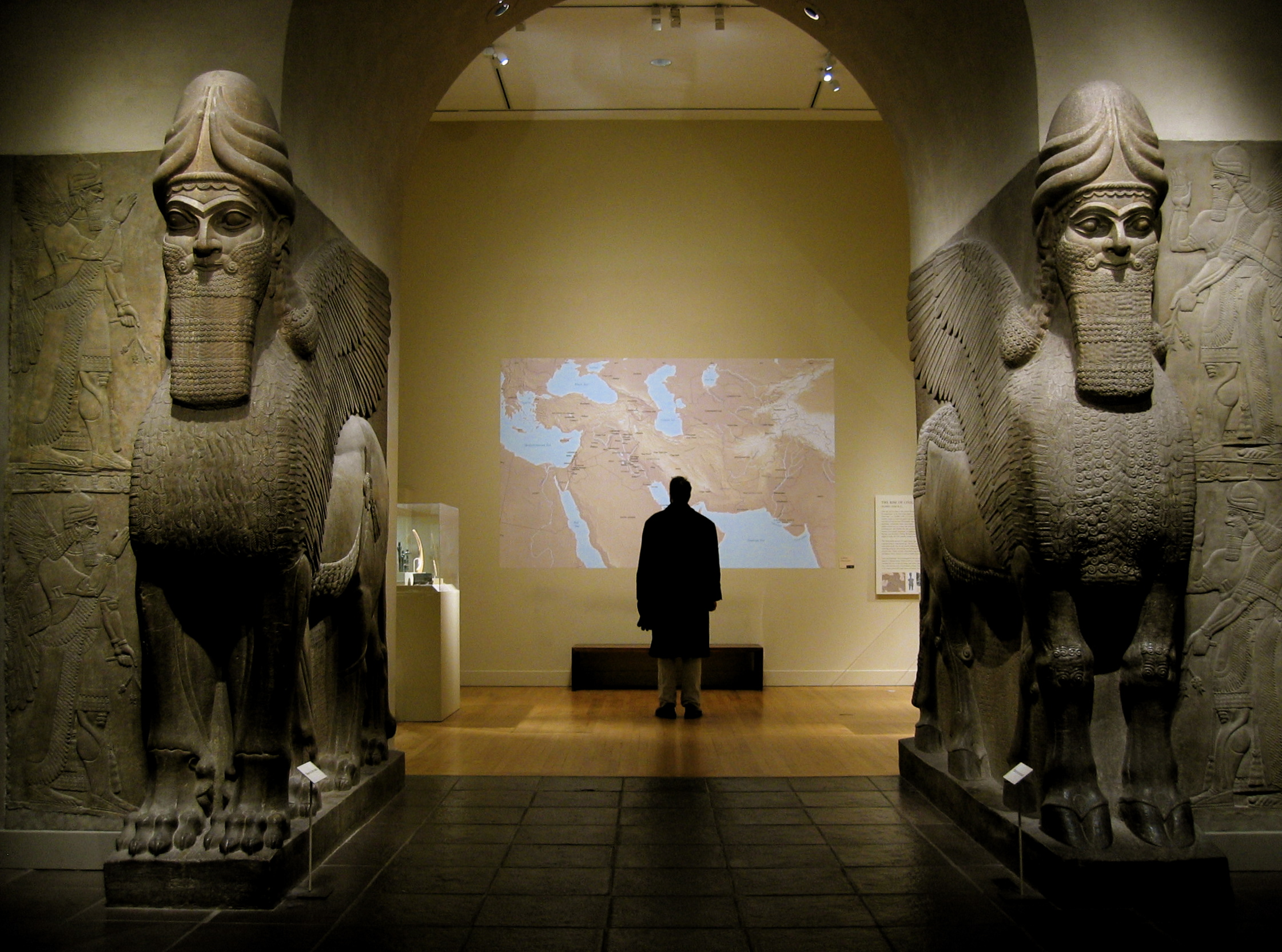
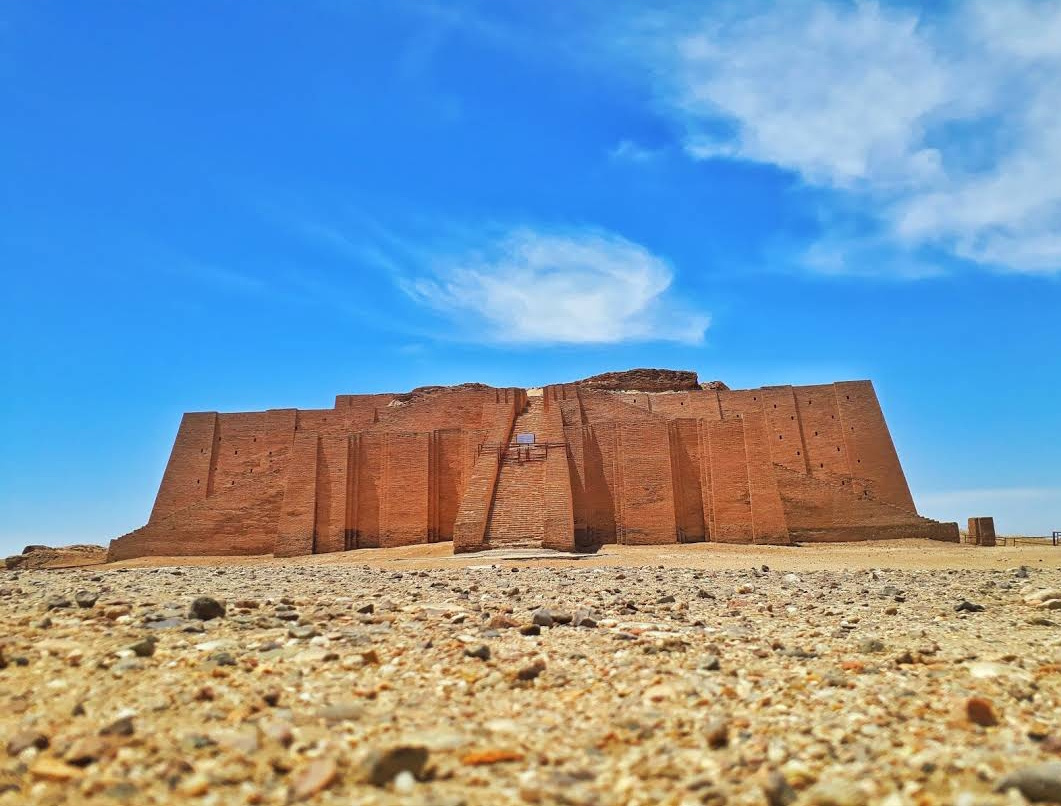
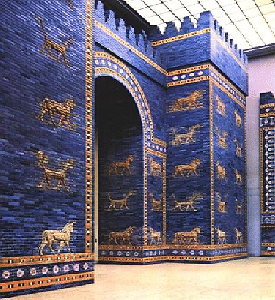
- Top: Lamassu from The Gate of Nimrud, Nineveh, approximately 1350 BC; Centre: The Ziggurat of Ur, approximately 21st century BC; Bottom: Reconstruction of the Ishtar Gate of Babylon, approximately 575 BC in the Pergamon Museum

Additional media
- Years active: 10th millennium-6th century BC
- Location: Mesopotamia
- Influenced: Ancient Greek; Achaemenid

The architecture of Mesopotamia is ancient architecture of the region of the Tigris–Euphrates river system (also known as Mesopotamia), encompassing several distinct cultures, which includes Sumerians and Akkadians (Ancient Assyrians and Babylonians), spanning a period from the 10th millennium BC (when the first permanent structures were built) to the 6th century BC. Among the Mesopotamian architectural accomplishments are the development of urban planning, the courtyard house, and ziggurats. Scribes had the role of architects in drafting and managing construction for the government, nobility, or royalty.

The study of ancient Mesopotamian architecture is based on available archaeological evidence, pictorial representation of buildings, and texts on building practices. According to Archibald Sayce, the primitive pictographs of the Uruk period era suggest that "Stone was scarce, but was already cut into blocks and seals. Brick was the ordinary building material, and with it cities, forts, temples, and houses were constructed. The city was provided with towers and stood on an artificial platform; the house also had a tower-like appearance. It was provided with a door which turned on a hinge, and could be opened with a sort of key; the city gate was on a larger scale, and seemed to have been double. ... Demons were feared who had wings like a bird, and the foundation stones – or rather bricks – of a house were consecrated by certain objects that were deposited under them."

Scholarly literature usually concentrates on the architecture of temples, palaces, city walls and gates, and other monumental buildings, but occasionally one finds works on residential architecture as well. Archaeological surface surveys also allowed for the study of urban form in early Mesopotamian cities.

== Building materials ==
Anu/White Temple ziggurat
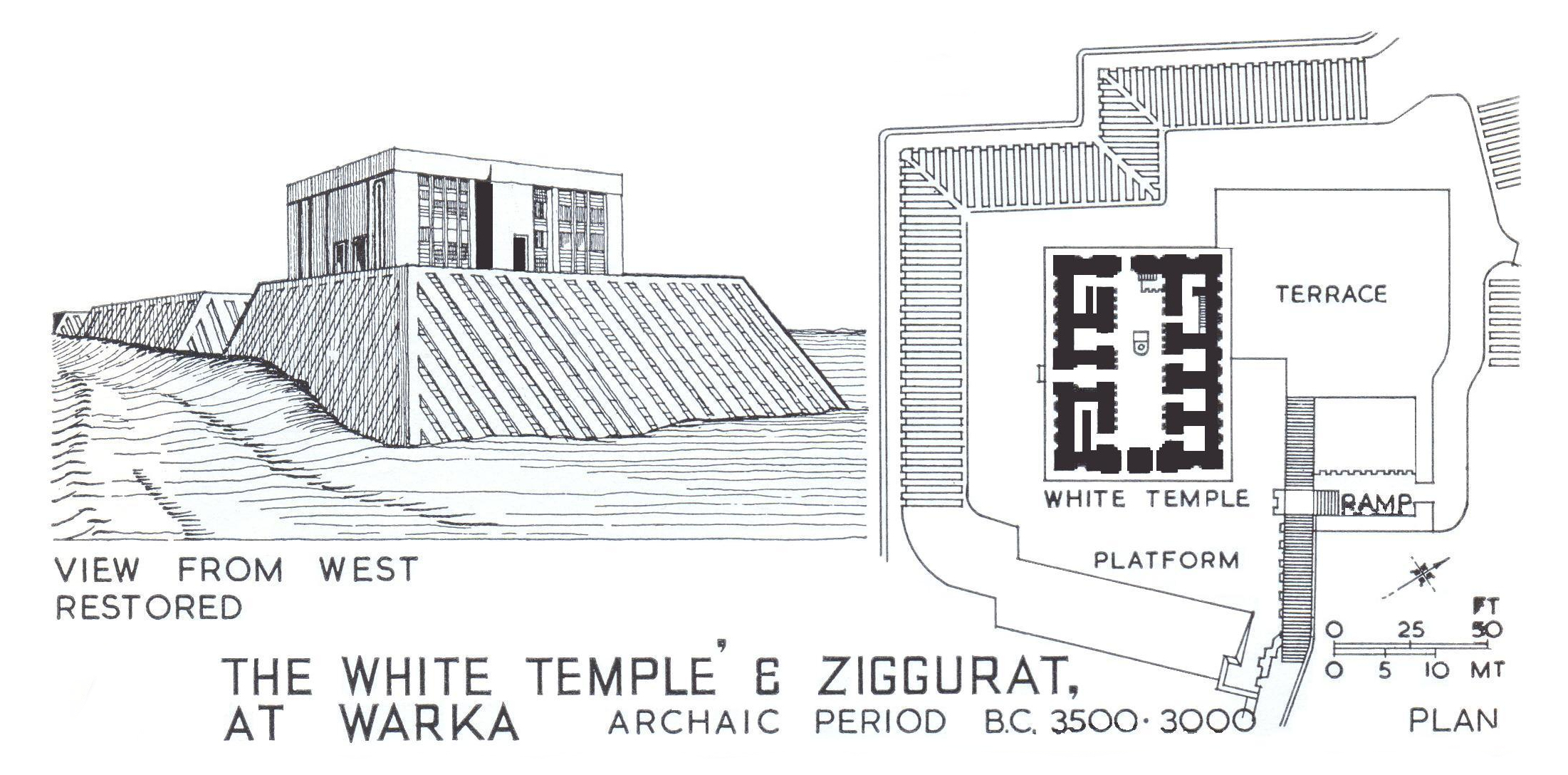
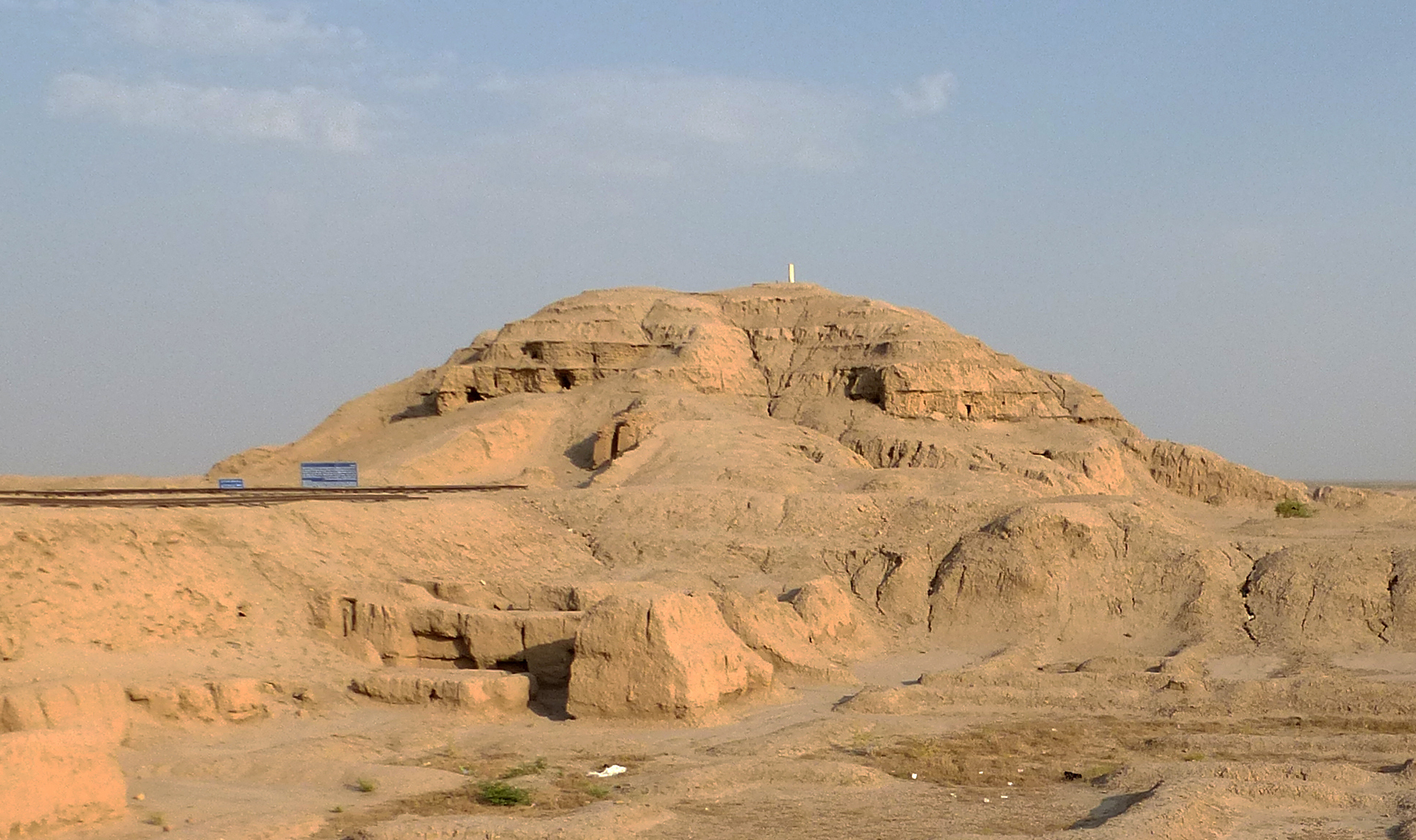
Anu/White Temple ziggurat at Uruk. The original pyramidal structure, the "Anu Ziggurat" dates to the Sumerians around 4000 BC, and the White Temple was built on top of it c. 3500 BC.

Sumerian masonry was usually mortarless although bitumen was sometimes used. Brick styles, which varied greatly over time, are categorized by period.

- Patzen 80×40×15 cm: Late Uruk period (3600–3200 BC)
- Riemchen 16×16 cm: Late Uruk period (3600–3200 BC)
- Plano-convex 10x19x34 cm: Early Dynastic Period (3100–2300 BC)

The favoured design was rounded bricks, which are somewhat unstable, so Mesopotamian bricklayers would lay a row of bricks perpendicular to the rest every few rows. The advantages of plano-convex bricks were the speed of manufacture as well as the irregular surface which held the finishing plaster coat better than a smooth surface from other brick types.

Bricks were sun baked to harden them. These types of bricks are much less durable than oven-baked ones so buildings eventually deteriorated. They were periodically destroyed, leveled, and rebuilt on the same spot. This planned structural life cycle gradually raised the level of cities, so that they came to be elevated above the surrounding plain. The resulting mounds are known as tells, and are found throughout the ancient Near East. Civic buildings slowed decay by using cones of coloured stone, terracotta panels, and clay nails driven into the adobe-brick to create a protective sheath that decorated the façade. Specially prized were imported building materials such as cedar from Lebanon, diorite from Arabia, and lapis lazuli from India.

Babylonian temples are massive structures of crude brick, supported by buttresses, the rain being carried off by drains. One such drain at Ur was made of lead. The use of brick led to the early development of the pilaster and column, and of frescoes and enamelled tiles. The walls were brilliantly coloured, and sometimes plated with zinc or gold, as well as with tiles. Painted terracotta cones for torches were also embedded in the plaster. Assyria, imitating Babylonian architecture, also built its palaces and temples of brick, even when stone was the natural building material of the country – faithfully preserving the brick platform, necessary in the marshy soil of Babylonia, but little needed in the north.

=== Decoration ===
As time went on, however, later Assyrian architects began to shake themselves free of Babylonian influence, and to use stone as well as brick. The walls of Assyrian palaces were lined with sculptured and coloured slabs of stone, instead of being painted as in Chaldea. Three stages may be traced in the art of these bas-reliefs: it is vigorous but simple under Ashurnasirpal II, careful and realistic under Sargon II, and refined but wanting in boldness under Ashurbanipal.

In Babylonia, in place of the bas relief, there is greater use of three-dimensional figures in the round – the earliest examples being the statues from Girsu, that are realistic if somewhat clumsy. The paucity of stone in Babylonia made every pebble precious, and led to a high perfection in the art of gem-cutting. Two seal-cylinders from the age of Sargon of Akkad are among the best examples of their kind. One of the first remarkable specimens of early metallurgy to be discovered by archaeologists is the silver vase of Entemena. At a later epoch, great excellence was attained in the manufacture of such jewellery as earrings and bracelets of gold. Copper, too, was worked with skill; indeed, it is possible that Babylonia was the original home of copper-working.

The people were famous at an early date for their embroideries and rugs. The forms of Assyrian pottery are graceful; the porcelain, like the glass discovered in the palaces of Nineveh, was derived from Egyptian models. Transparent glass seems to have been first introduced in the reign of Sargon. Stone, clay and glass were used to make vases, and vases of hard stone have been dug up at Girsu similar to those of the early dynastic period of Egypt.

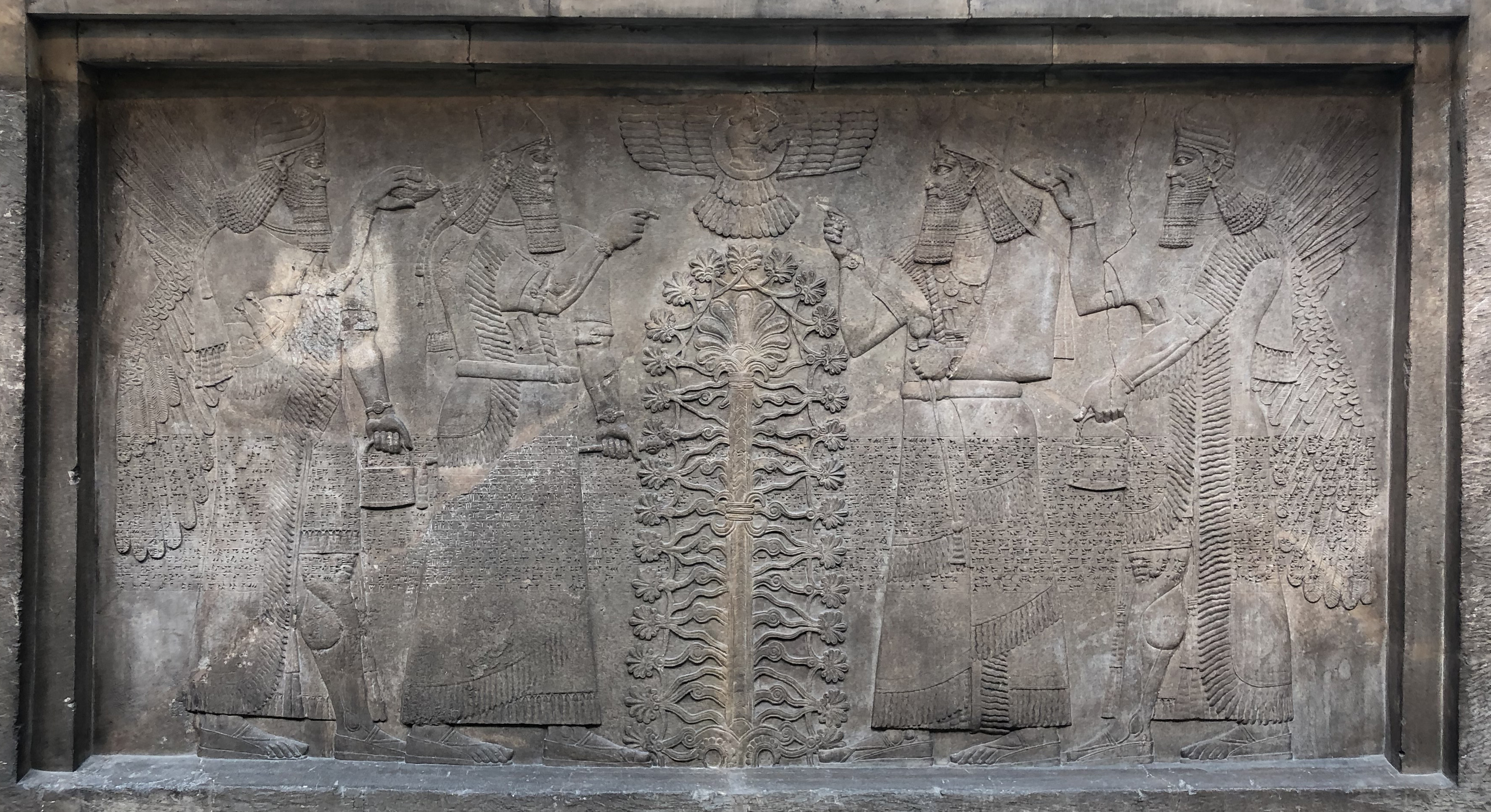
King Ashurnasirpal's throneroom relief showing Ashur hovering above the tree of life.

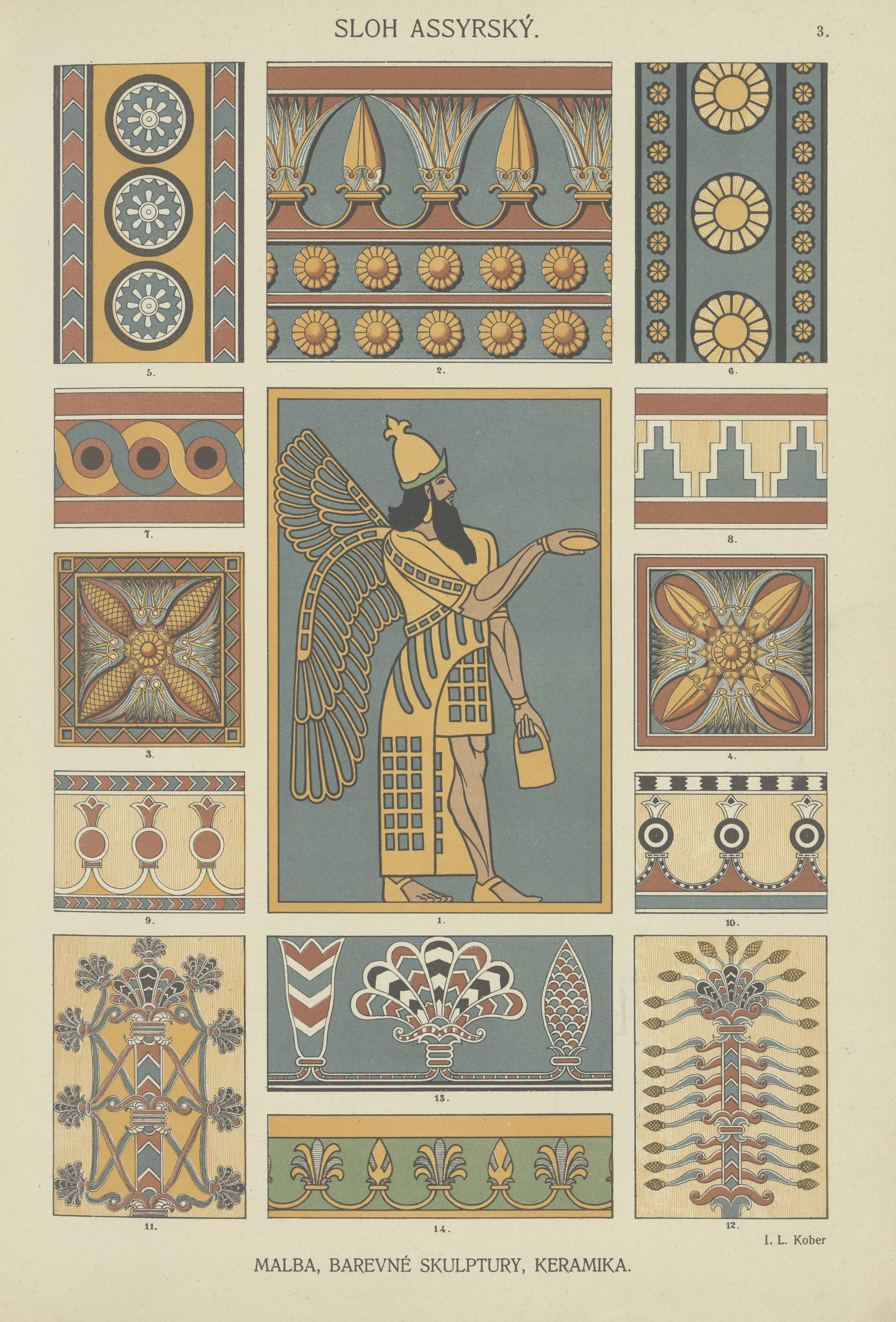
An image showcasing Mesopotamian Assyrian decoration and ornamentation

== Urban planning ==
The Sumerians were the first society to conceive and construct the city as a 'planned' construct. That they were proud of this achievement is attested to in the Epic of Gilgamesh which opens with a description of Uruk—its massive walls, streets, markets, temples, and gardens. Uruk became the template of an urban culture which spread throughout Western Asia via colonization and conquest, and more generally as societies became larger and more sophisticated.

The construction of cities was the end product of trends which began in the Neolithic Revolution. The growth of the city was partly planned and partly organic. Planning is evident in the walls, high temple district, main canal with harbor, and main street. The finer structure of residential and commercial spaces is the reaction of economic forces to the spatial limits imposed by the planned areas resulting in an irregular design with regular features. Because the Sumerians recorded real estate transactions it is possible to reconstruct much of the urban growth pattern, density, property value, and other metrics from cuneiform text source

The typical city divided space into residential, mixed use, commercial, and civic spaces. The residential areas were grouped by profession. At the core of the city was a high temple complex always sited slightly off of the geographical centre. This high temple usually predated the founding of the city and was the nucleus around which the urban form grew. The districts adjacent to gates had a special religious and economic function.

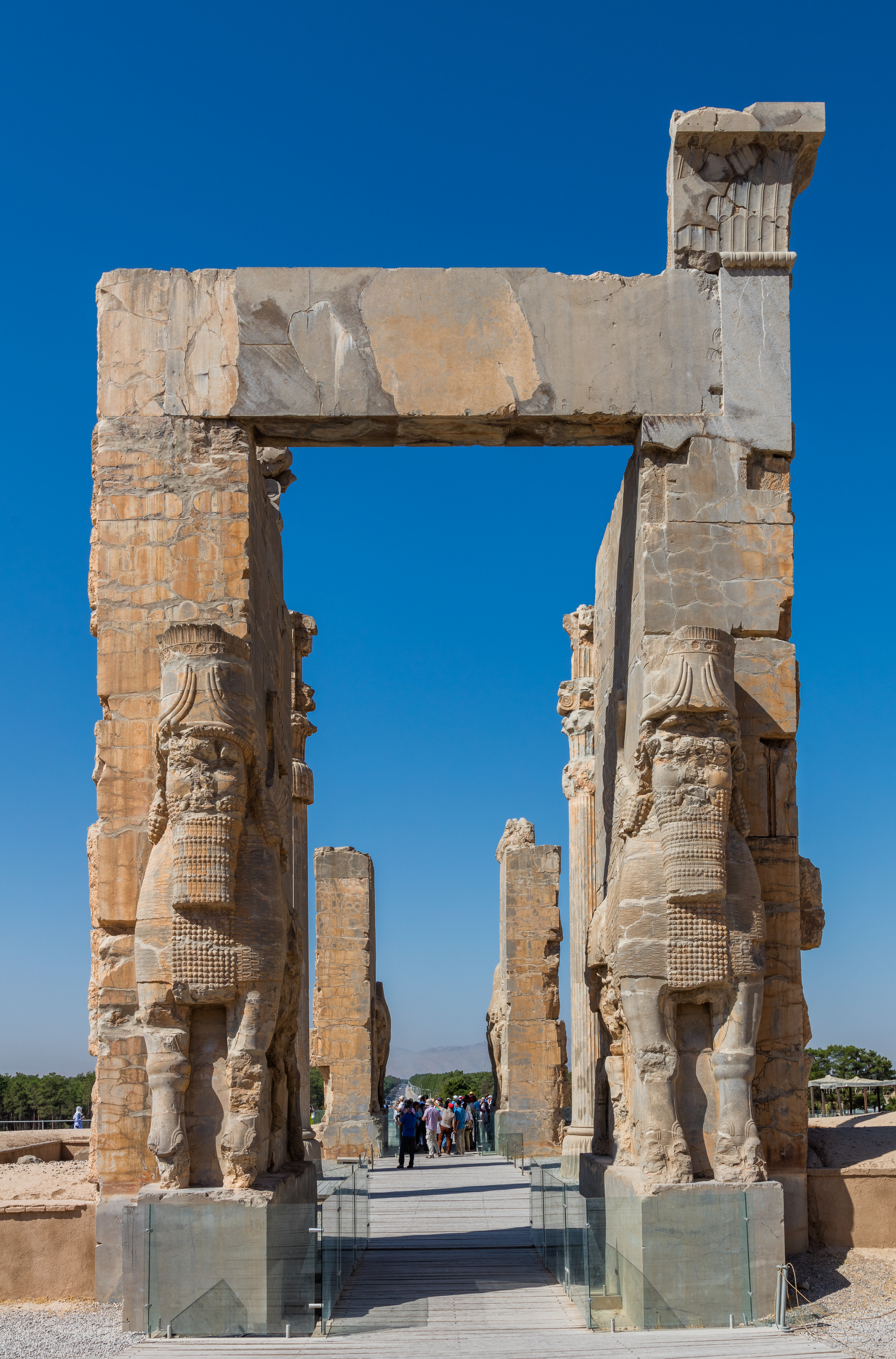
Lamassu in Persepolis, Iran, showing Mesopotamain Architecture Outside of Mesopotamia

The city always included a belt of irrigated agricultural land including small hamlets. A network of roads and canals connected the city to this land. The transportation network was organized in three tiers: wide processional streets (Akkadian: sūqu ilāni u šarri), public through streets (Akkadian: sūqu nišī), and private blind alleys (Akkadian: mūṣû). The public streets that defined a block varied little over time while the blind-alleys were much more fluid. The current estimate is 10% of the city area was streets and 90% buildings. The canals; however, were more important than roads for good transportation.

== Houses ==
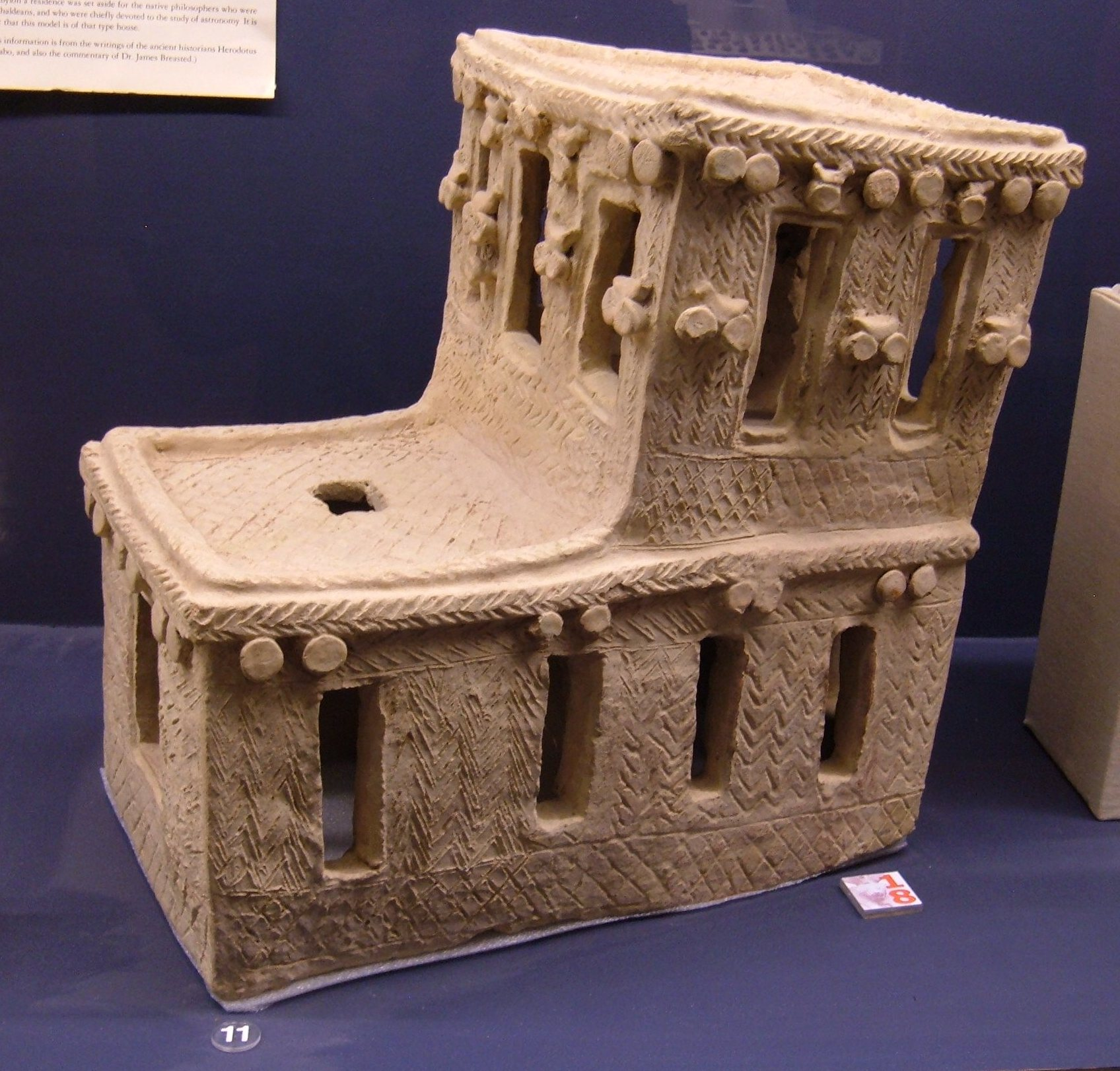
Terracotta model of a house. Early Dynastic Period, Rosicrucian Egyptian Museum, San Jose, California

The materials used to build a Mesopotamian house were similar but not exact as those used today: reeds, stone, wood, ashlar, mud brick, mud plaster and wooden doors, which were all naturally available around the city, although wood was not common in some cities of Sumer. Although most houses were made of mudbrick, mudplaster, and poplar. Houses could be tripartite, round, or rectangular. Houses had long-roofed central hallways, courtyards, and storeys. Most houses had a square centre room with other rooms attached to it, but a great variation in the size and materials used to build the houses suggest they were built by the inhabitants themselves. The smallest rooms may not have coincided with the poorest people; in fact, it could be that the poorest people built houses out of perishable materials such as reeds on the outside of the city, but there is very little direct evidence for this. Houses could have shops, workshops, storage rooms, and livestock in them.

Residential design was a direct development from Ubaid houses. Although Sumerian cylinder seals depict reed houses, the courtyard house was the predominant typology, which has been used in Mesopotamia to the present day. This house called é (Cuneiform: 𒂍, e₂; Sumerian: e₂; Akkadian: bītu) faced inward toward an open courtyard which provided a cooling effect by creating convection currents. This courtyard called tarbaṣu (Akkadian) was the primary organizing feature of the house, all the rooms opened into it. The external walls were featureless with only a single opening connecting the house to the street, movement between the house and street required a 90° turn through a small antechamber. From the street only the rear wall of the antechamber would be visible through an open door, likewise there was no view of the street from the courtyard; this is because the Sumerians had a strict division of public and private spaces. The typical size for a Sumerian house was 90 m^{2}.

=== Construction ===
Simple houses could be constructed out of bundles of reeds which would be tied together, and then inserted into the ground. More complex houses were constructed on stone foundations, with the house being made out of mudbrick. Wood, ashlar blocks, and rubble were also popular materials used to make houses. The mudbrick was made from clay and chopped straw. This mixture was packed into molds and then left in the sun to dry. They used mud plaster for the walls, and mud and poplar for the roof. In the Ubaid period houses would be fire clay pressed into the walls. Walls would also have artwork painted on them. Roofs could also be made planks of palm tree wood which would be covered in reeds. The top of the roof would be connected to the house through brick or wood stairs. Baked bricks were very expensive, and thus they were only used to make luxurious buildings. Doors and door frames were made from wood. Sometimes Doors were made from ox-hide. Doors between houses were often so low, that people needed to crouch to walk through them. Houses would usually have no windows, if they did it would be made of clay or wooden grilles. Floors would usually be made of dirt. Mesopotamian houses would often crumble. Houses needed to be repaired often.

=== Design ===
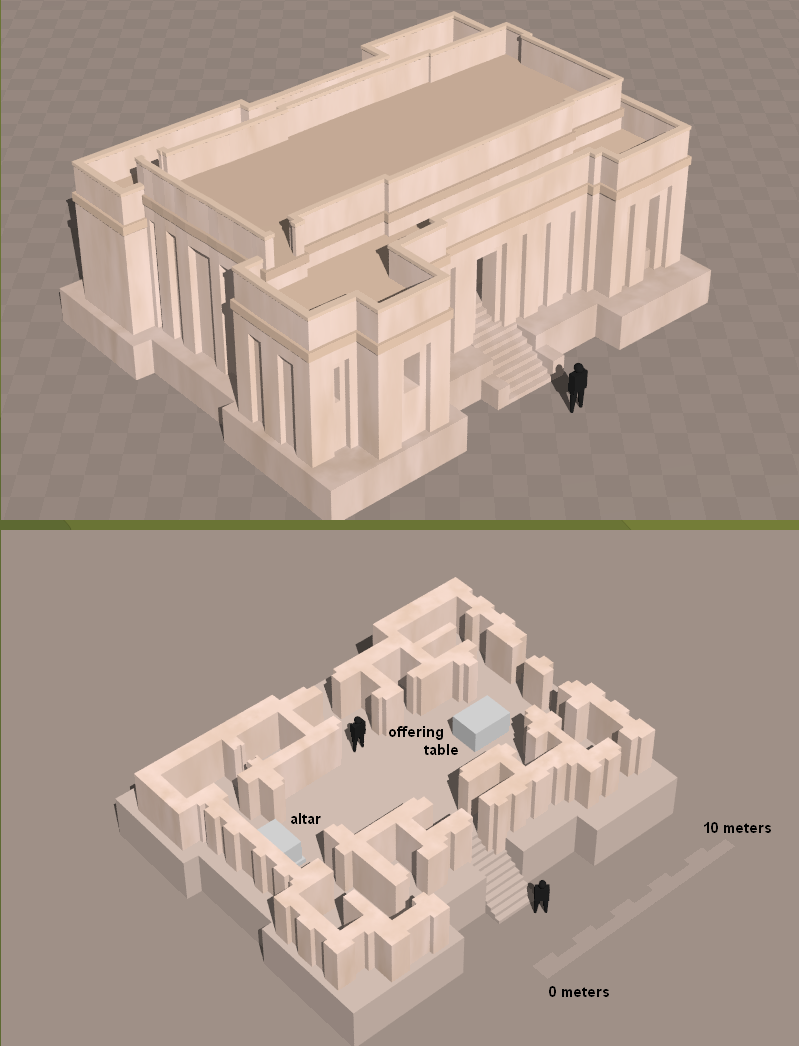
Large buildings, implying centralized government, started to be made. Eridu Temple, final Ubaid.

In the Ubaid period houses would be tripartite homes. They had a long roofed central hallway with smaller rooms connected to it on either of its sides. It is possible that the central hallway was used for dining and communal activities. There was variety in Ubaid houses. Some houses contained richer artifact assemblage than other houses. Ubaid houses could also be interconnect with other houses. The architecture of Ubaid houses is indistinguishable from Ubaid Temples. During the Uruk period houses had various shapes. Some houses were rectangular, others were round. Some houses in Mesopotamia had only one room, while others had many rooms. Occasionally some of these rooms would serve as basements. In the 3000's BCE, courtyards were introduced to Mesopotamia. Courtyards would become the basis for Mesopotamian architecture. These court yards would be surrounded by thick walled halls. These halls were probably reception rooms for guests. It is likely that most houses had an upper storey. The upper storey might have been used dining, sleeping, and entertaining, and might have also housed the bedrooms. People would plant vegetables or perform religious rituals on their roofs. Ground floors would be used to for shops, workshops, storage, and livestock. One room was usually a sanctuary.

=== Furniture ===
In ancient Sumer, houses contained elaborately decorated stools, chairs, jars, and bathtubs. Wealthier citizens had toilets and proper drainage systems. It is possible some houses had altars in the center of the houses. These altars could have been dedicated to the gods, but they could have been dedicated to important people.

== Palaces ==
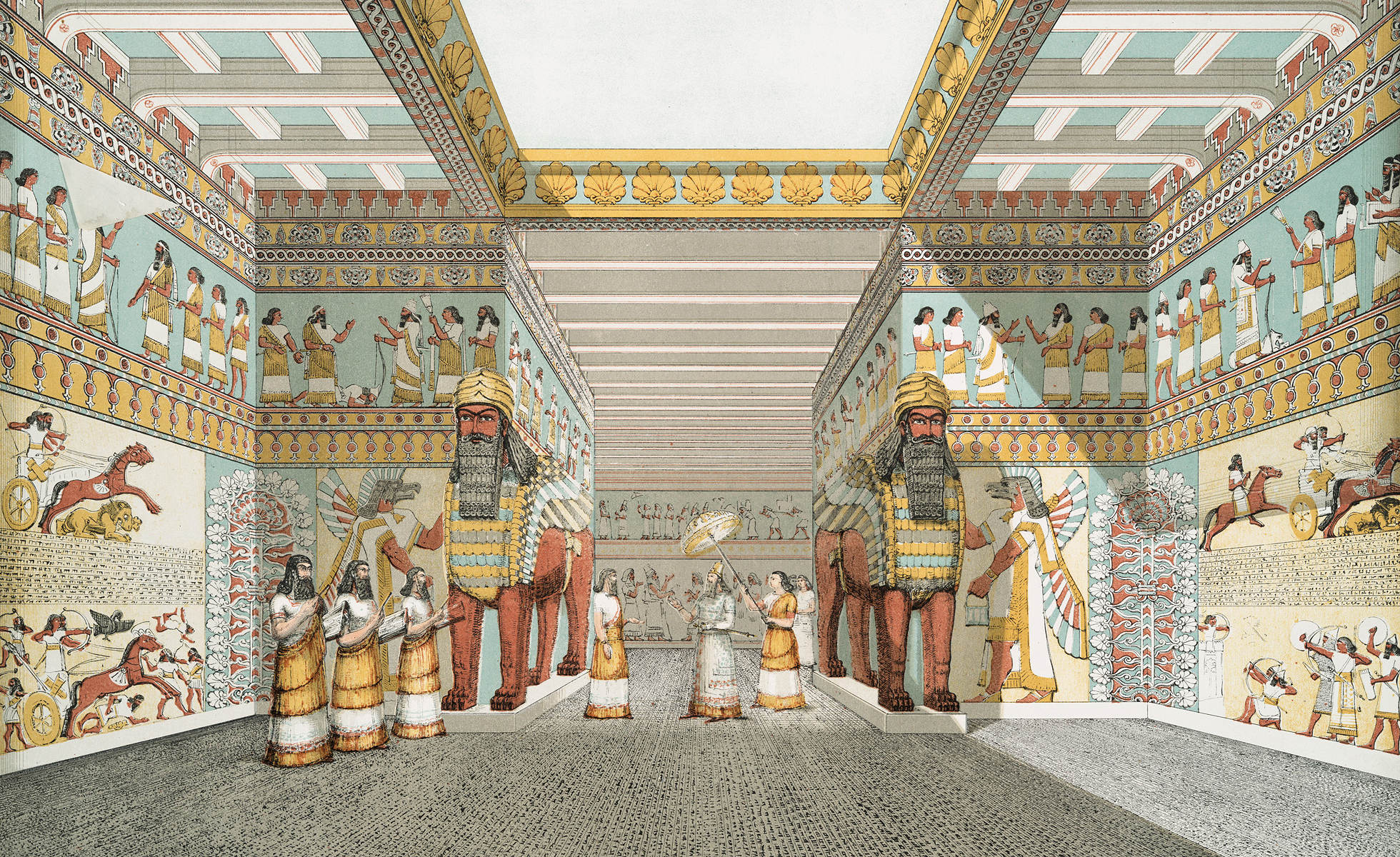
Artist's impression of a hall in an Assyrian palace from The Monuments of Nineveh by Austen Henry Layard, 1853

The palace came into existence during the Early Dynastic I period. From a rather modest beginning the palace grows in size and complexity as power is increasingly centralized. The palace is called a 'Big House' (Cuneiform: ^{E₂}.GAL, Sumerian: e₂-gal, Akkadian: ekallu) where the lugal or ensi lived and worked.

The palaces of the early Mesopotamian elites were large-scale complexes, and were often lavishly decorated. Earliest known examples are from the Diyala River valley sites such as Khafajah and Tell Asmar. These third millennium BC palaces functioned as large-scale socio-economic institutions, and therefore, along with residential and private functions, they housed craftsmen workshops, food storehouses, ceremonial courtyards, and are often associated with shrines. For instance, the so-called "giparu" (Sumerian: ^{e₂}gi₆-par₄-ku₃) at Ur where the Moon god Nanna's priestesses resided was a major complex with multiple courtyards, a number of sanctuaries, burial chambers for dead priestesses, and a ceremonial banquet hall. A similarly complex example of a Mesopotamian palace was excavated at Mari in Syria, dating from the Old Babylonian period.

Assyrian palaces of the Iron Age, especially at Kalhu/Nimrud, Dur Sharrukin/Khorsabad and Ninuwa/Nineveh, have become famous due to the Assyrian palace reliefs, extensive pictorial and textual narrative programs on their walls, all carved on stone slabs known as orthostats. These pictorial programs incorporated either cultic scenes or the narrative accounts of the kings' military and civic accomplishments. Gates and important passageways were flanked with massive stone sculptures of apotropaic mythological figures, lamassu and winged genies. The architectural arrangement of these Iron Age palaces were also organized around large and small courtyards. Usually the king's throne room opened to a massive ceremonial courtyard where important state councils met and state ceremonies were performed.

Massive amounts of ivory furniture pieces were found in some Assyrian palaces pointing to an intense trade relationship with North Syrian Neo-Hittite states at the time. Bronze repousse bands decorated the wooden gates of major buildings, but were mostly looted at the fall of the empire; the Balawat Gates are the principal survivors.

== Temples ==
Temples often predated the creation of the urban settlement and grew from small one room structures to elaborate multiacre complexes across the 2,500 years of Sumerian history. Sumerian temples, fortifications, and palaces made use of more advanced materials and techniques, such as buttresses, recesses, and half columns. Chronologically, Sumerian temples evolved from earlier Ubaid temples. As the temple decayed it was ritually destroyed and a new temple built on its foundations. The successor temple was larger and more articulated than its predecessor temple. The evolution of the E₂.abzu temple at Eridu is a frequently cited case-study of this process. Many temples had inscriptions engraved into them, such as the one at Tell Uqair. Palaces and city walls came much later after temples in the Early Dynastic Period.

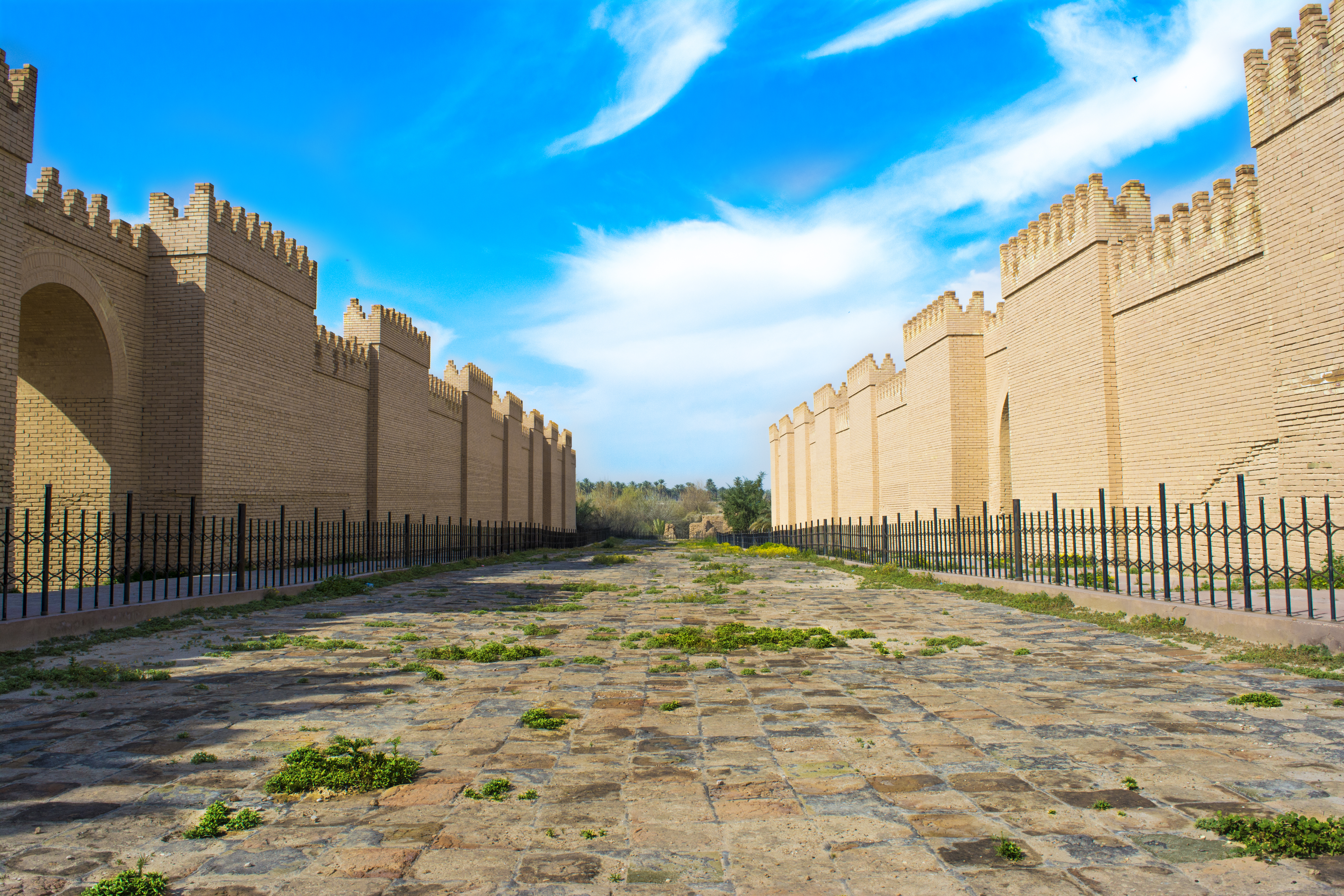
A partial view of the ruins of Babylon.

The form of a Sumerian temple is manifestation of Near Eastern cosmology, which described the world as a disc of land which was surrounded by a salt water ocean, both of which floated on another sea of fresh water called apsu, above them was a hemispherical firmament which regulated time. A world mountain formed an axis mundi that joined all three layers. The role of the temple was to act as that axis mundi, a meeting place between gods and men. The sacredness of 'high places' as a meeting point between realms is a pre-Ubaid belief well attested in the Near East back the Neolithic age. The plan of the temple was rectangular with the corners pointing in cardinal directions to symbolize the four rivers which flow from the mountain to the four world regions. The orientation also serves a more practical purpose of using the temple roof as an observatory for Sumerian timekeeping. The temple was built on a low terrace of rammed earth meant to represent the sacred mound of primordial land which emerged from the water called dukug, 'pure mound' (Sumerian: du₆-ku₃ Cuneiform:) during creation.

The doors of the long axis were the entry point for the gods, and the doors of the short axis the entry point for men. This configuration was called the bent axis approach, as anyone entering would make a ninety degree turn to face the cult statue at the end of the central hall.

The bent axis approach is an innovation from the Ubaid temples which had a linear axis approach, and is also a feature of Sumerian houses. An offering table was located in the centre of the temple at the intersection of the axes.

Temples of the Uruk Period divided the temple rectangle into tripartite, T-shaped, or combined plans. The tripartite plan inherited from the Ubaid had a large central hall with two smaller flanking halls on either side. The entry was along the short axis and the shrine was at the end of the long axis. The T-shaped plan, also from the Ubaid period, was identical to the tripartite plan except for a hall at one end of the rectangle perpendicular to the main hall. Temple C from the Eanna district of Uruk is a case-study of classical temple form.

There was an explosion of diversity in temple design during the following Early Dynastic Period. The temples still retained features such as cardinal orientation, rectangular plans, and buttresses. Now however they took on a variety new configurations including courtyards, walls, basins, and barracks. The Sin Temple in Khafajah is typical of this era, as it was designed around a series of courtyards leading to a cella.

The high temple was a special type of temple that was home to the patron god of the city. Functionally, it served as a storage and distribution centre as well as housing the priesthood. The White Temple of Anu in Uruk is typical of a high temple which was built very high on a platform of adobe-brick. In the Early Dynastic period high temples began to include a ziggurat, a series of platforms creating a stepped pyramid. Such ziggurats may have been the inspiration for the Biblical Tower of Babel.

=== Ziggurats ===
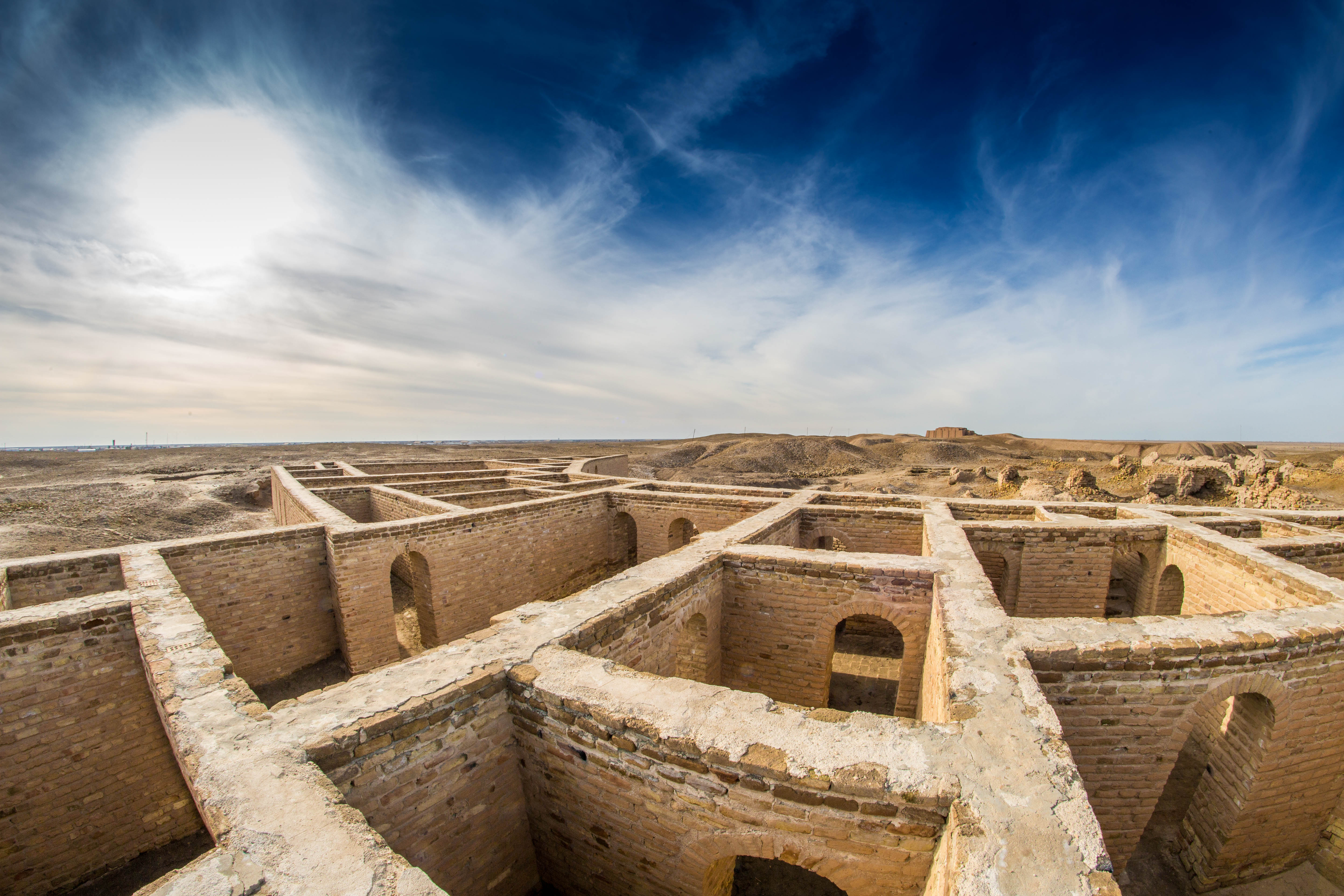
The alleged Abraham house in Ur, southern Iraq

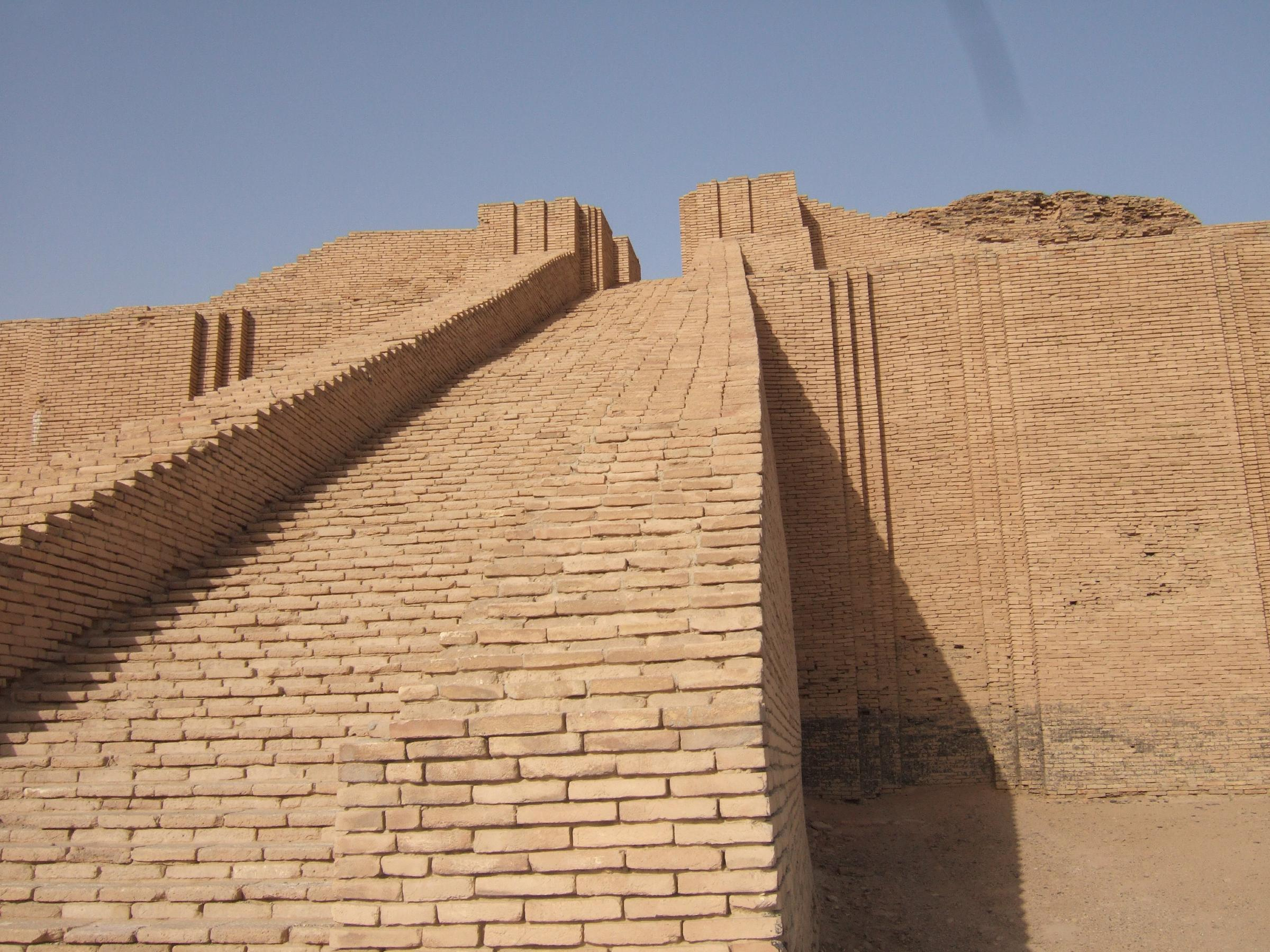
Partially reconstructed facade and access staircase of the Ziggurat of Ur, originally built by Ur-Nammu, c. 2100 BC

Ziggurats were huge pyramidal temple towers which were first built in Sumerian City-States and then developed in Babylonia and Assyrian cities as well. There are 32 ziggurats known at, or near, Mesopotamia—28 in Iraq and 4 in Iran. Notable ziggurats include the Great Ziggurat of Ur near Nasiriyah, Iraq, the Ziggurat of Aqar Quf near Baghdad, Iraq, Chogha Zanbil in Khūzestān, Iran (the most recent to be discovered), and the Sialk near Kashan, Iran. Ziggurats were built by the Sumerians, Babylonians, Elamites, and Assyrians as monuments to local religions. The earliest examples of the ziggurat were raised platforms that date from the Ubaid period during the fourth millennium BC, and the latest date from the 6th century BC. The top of the ziggurat was flat, unlike many pyramids. The step pyramid style began near the end of the Early Dynastic Period.

Built in receding tiers upon a rectangular, oval, or square platform, the ziggurat was a pyramidal structure. Sun-baked bricks made up the core of the ziggurat with facings of fired bricks on the outside. The facings were often glazed in different colours and may have had astrological significance. Kings sometimes had their names engraved on these glazed bricks. The number of tiers ranged from two to seven, with a shrine or temple at the summit. Access to the shrine was provided by a series of ramps on one side of the ziggurat or by a spiral ramp from base to summit. It has been suggested that ziggurats were built to resemble mountains, but there is little textual or archaeological evidence to support that hypothesis.

Classical ziggurats emerged in the Neo-Sumerian Period with articulated buttresses, vitreous brick sheathing, and entasis in the elevation. The Ziggurat of Ur is the best example of this style. Another change in temple design in this period was a straight as opposed to bent-axis approach to the temple.

Ur-Nammu's ziggurat at Ur was designed as a three-stage construction, but today only two of these survive. This entire mudbrick core structure was originally given a facing of baked brick envelope set in bitumen, 2.5 m on the first lowest stage, and 1.15 m on the second. Each of these baked bricks were stamped with the name of the king. The sloping walls of the stages were buttressed. The access to the top was by means of a triple monumental staircase, which all converges at a portal that opened on a landing between the first and second stages. The height of the first stage was about 11 m while the second stage rose some 5.7 m. Usually, a third stage is reconstructed by the excavator of the ziggurat (Leonard Woolley), and crowned by a temple. At the Chogha Zanbil ziggurat, archaeologists have found massive reed ropes that ran across the core of the ziggurat structure and tied together the mudbrick mass.

The most notable architectural remains from early Mesopotamia are the temple complexes at Uruk from the 4th millennium BC, temples and palaces from the Early Dynastic period sites in the Diyala River valley such as Khafajah and Tell Asmar, the Third Dynasty of Ur remains at Nippur (Sanctuary of Enlil) and Ur (Sanctuary of Nanna), Middle Bronze Age remains at Syrian-Turkish sites of Ebla, Mari, Alalakh, Aleppo and Kultepe, Late Bronze Age palaces at Hattusa, Ugarit, Ashur and Nuzi, Iron Age palaces and temples at Assyrian (Kalhu/Nimrud, Khorsabad, Nineveh), Babylonian (Babylon), Urartian (Tushpa/Van, Haykaberd, Ayanis, Armavir, Erebuni, Bastam) and Neo-Hittite sites (Karkamis, Tell Halaf, Karatepe). Houses are mostly known from Old Babylonian remains at Nippur and Ur. Among the textual sources on building construction and associated rituals are Gudea's cylinders from the late 3rd millennium are notable, as well as the Assyrian and Babylonian royal inscriptions from the Iron Age.

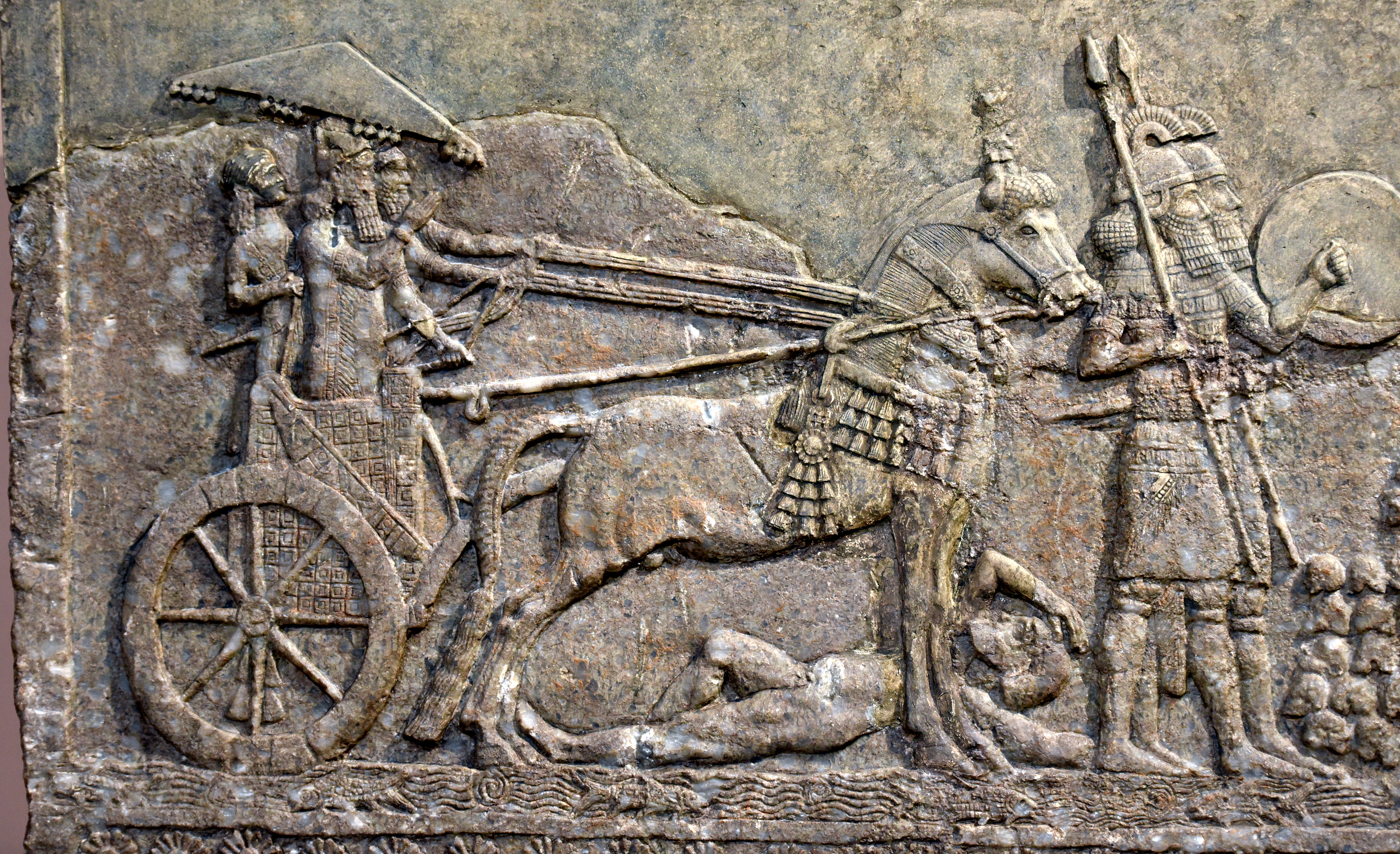
Sargon II in his royal chariot, tramping a dead or dying enemy, part of a war scene from Dur-Sharrukin. Iraq Museum

== Landscape architecture ==
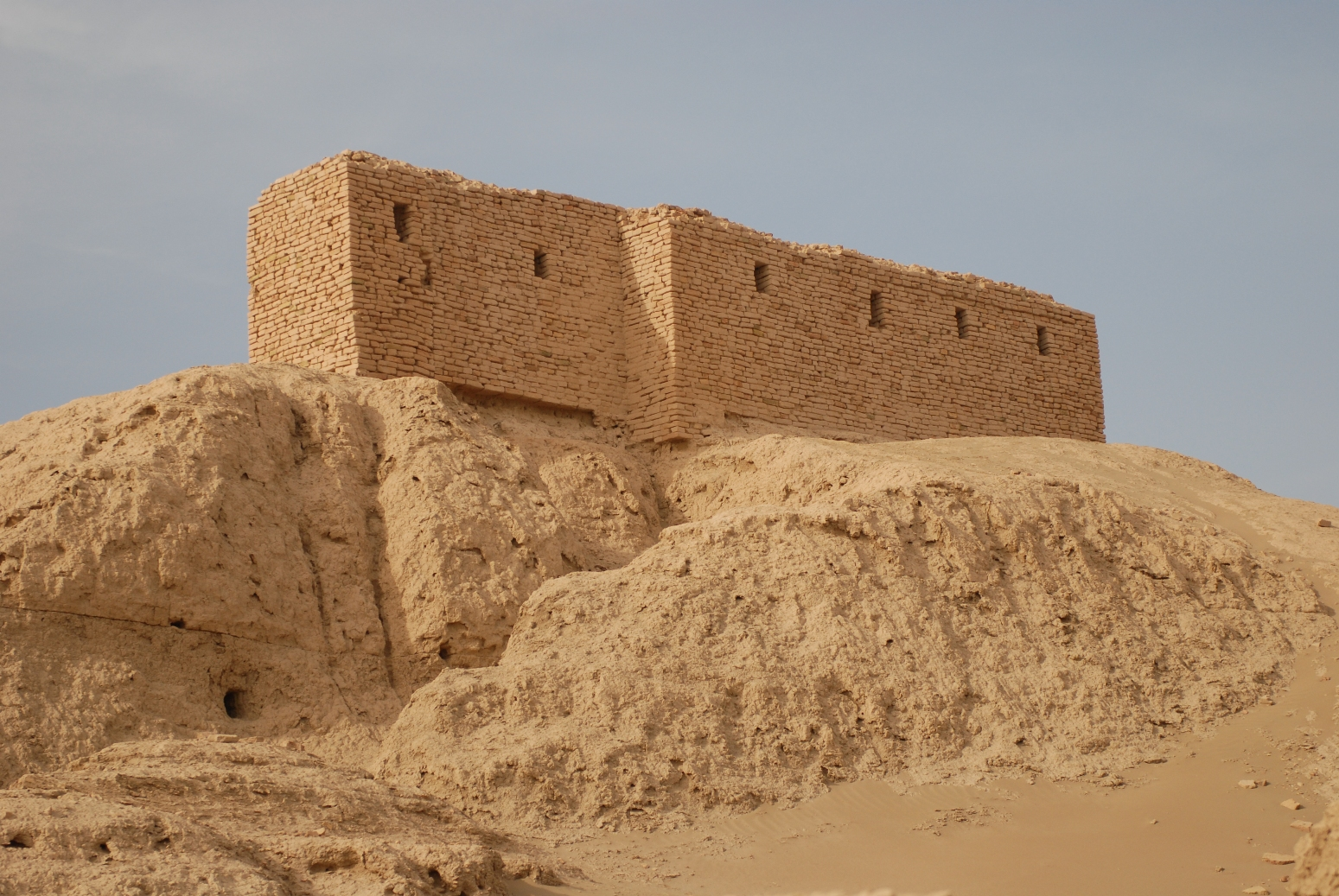
Ruins from a temple ancient Nippur, said to be the site for the meeting of Sumerian gods, as well as the place that man was created.

Text sources indicate open space planning was a part of the city from the earliest times. The description of Uruk in the Epic of Gilgamesh tells of one third of that city set aside for orchards. Similar planned open space is found at the one fifth enclosure of Nippur. Another important landscape element was the vacant lot (Akkadian: kišubbû).

External to the city, Sumerian irrigation agriculture created some of the first garden forms in history. The garden (sar) was 144 square cubits with a perimeter canal. This form of the enclosed quadrangle was the basis for the later paradise gardens of Persia.

In Mesopotamia, the use of fountains date as far back as the 3rd millennium BC. An early example is preserved in a carved Babylonian basin, dating back to ca. 3000 B.C., found at Girsu, Lagash. An ancient Assyrian fountain "discovered in the gorge of the Comel River consists of basins cut in solid rock and descending in steps to the stream." The water was led from small conduits.

== See also ==
- Ancient Mesopotamian units of measurement
- Abbasid architecture
- Achaemenid architecture
- List of cities of the ancient Near East
