= William W. Hallo =

American scholar of ancient history born in Germany (1928-2015)

William W. Hallo

William Wolfgang Hallo (March 9, 1928 – March 27, 2015) was professor of Assyriology and Babylonian Literature and curator of the Babylonian collection at Yale University. He was born in Kassel, Germany.

Hallo was a Master of Morse College, one of the twelve residential colleges at Yale University, between 1982 and 1987.

Hallo and J. J. A. Van Dijk published the first translations and book-length discussion of the work of the Sumerian priestess and poet Enheduanna in 1968.

== Early life and education ==
Born in Kassel, Germany, in 1928, Hallo was the son of Rudolf Hallo, an art historian, and Gertrude Rubensohn Hallo, an economist. He fled Germany in 1939 for England on the Kindertransport, and immigrated to the United States with his mother and sisters in 1941. He received his B.A. from Harvard in 1950, and studied in the Netherlands in 1950-1951 through a Fulbright Fellowship at the University of Leiden. Hallo received his Ph.D. in 1956 from the Oriental Institute with a fellowship from the University of Chicago under Professor I.J. Gelb.

== Career ==
After receiving his Ph.D., Hallo worked at Hebrew Union College’s Jewish Institute of Religion. In 1962, Hallo became assistant curator (and later curator) of the Babylonian Collection and the William M. Laffan Professor of Assyriology and Babylonian Literature at Yale, where he taught until his retirement in 2002.

Within Assyriology, Hallo focused on Sumerian literature, history, and language. He applied these studies to biblical scholarship, comparing biblical and ancient Near Eastern texts. Along with K.L. Younger, he co-edited The Context of Scripture, a three-volume compilation of ancient Near Eastern writings. Hallo also contributed to the Reform movement’s The Torah: A Modern Commentary.

In 1971, Hallo translated Franz Rosenzweig's The Star of Redemption, from German into English. Hallo's 1971 translation was considered the standard text until Barbara Galli's new translation was published in 2005.

== Personal life ==
Hallo met and married his first wife, Edith Pinto, a Dutch Holocaust survivor, in the Netherlands in 1951. Together they had two children. After the death of Edith in 1994, he married Nanette Stahl, a Yale librarian and curator, in 1998.

== Death ==
Hallo died on March 27, 2015.

== Works ==
- Hallo, William W. (1957). Early Mesopotamian Royal Titles. New Haven, CT: American Oriental Society. ISBN 0-940490-43-9.
- Hallo, William W.; Simpson, William Kelly (1971). The Ancient Near East: A History. Harcourt Brace College Publishers. ISBN 0-15-503819-2.
- Hallo, William W. (1996). Origins : The Ancient Near Eastern Background of Some Modern Western Institutions. Brill. ISBN 90-04-10328-7.
- Hallo, William W. (2009). The World's Oldest Literature: Studies in Sumerian Belles-Lettres. Brill. ISBN 978-90-04-17381-1.

=== Translations ===
- Rosenzweig, Franz (1971). Der Stern der Erlösung [The Star of Redemption]. Trans. William W. Hallo. New York: Holt, Rinehart and Winston. ISBN 0-03-085077-0.
