= Miguel Civil =

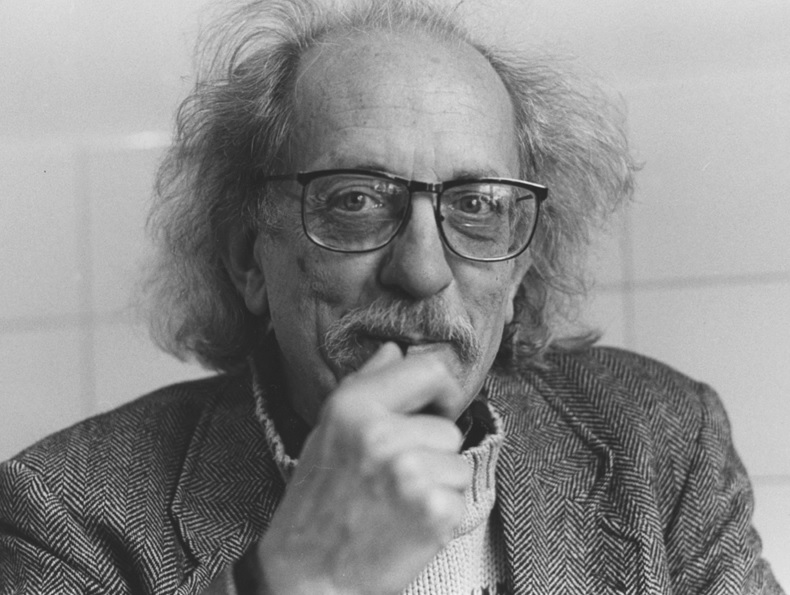
Miguel Civil

Miguel Civil (Miquel Civil i Desveus; May 7, 1926 – January 13, 2019) was an American Assyriologist and expert on Sumer and Ancient Mesopotamian studies at the University of Chicago Oriental Institute. According to his colleague, Christopher Woods, at the time of his death, Civil knew the Sumerian language better than anyone since it was last spoken 4000 years ago.

== Early life ==
Civil was born in 1926 in Sabadell, Barcelona, Spain. He studied Sumerology in Paris and was associate researcher at the University of Pennsylvania from 1958 to 1963. From 1964 until 2001, he was Professor of Sumerology at the Oriental Institute in the University of Chicago. He was also associate director of studies of the École Pratique des Hautes Études in Paris, epigraphist of the Nippur Expedition to Iraq, a member of the editorial board of the Chicago Assyrian Dictionary, and main editor of the series Materials for the Sumerian Lexicon (in which he published several volumes). He is widely considered the world expert in the use of the cuneiform script to write down the Sumerian language (i.e., the writing interface of Sumerian); Rykle Borger called him der beste Kenner der sumerischen Schrift (the best expert in Sumerian writing).

He devoted his scholarship to achieve a better understanding of the Sumerian language and its textual corpus, publishing extensively on Sumerian literary and lexical texts, as well as many contributions that illuminate diverse aspects of the Sumerian writing system, language, literature, and culture, from phonology to agriculture. Civil also published several contributions on the texts from Ebla. His main monographs include: The Farmer's Instructions: A Sumerian Agricultural Manual (Sabadell, 1994); The Early Dynastic Practical Vocabulary A (Archaic HAR-ra A) (Rome, 2008); and The Lexical texts in the Schøyen Collection (Bethesda, Md., 2010).

== Death ==
Civil died in Chicago, Illinois at the age of 92.

== Selected publications ==
- 1960. “Prescriptions médicales sumériennes.” Revue d'Assyriologie 54: 57–72.
- 1961. “The home of the fish: A sumerian literary composition.” Iraq 23: 154–175.
- 1964. “A hymn to the beer goddess and a drinking song.” In Studies presented to A. Leo Oppenheim. pp. 67–89. Chicago: Oriental Institute.
- 1965. Le débat sumérien entre la houe et l’araire. Paris: unpublished doctoral dissertation.
- 1966. “Notes on Sumerian lexicography, I.” Journal of Cuneiform Studies 20: 119–124.
- 1967. “Šū-Sîn’s historical inscriptions: Collection B.” Journal of Cuneiform Studies 21: 24–38.
- 1968. “Išme-Dagan and Enlil’s chariot.” Journal of the American Oriental Society 88: 3–14.
- 1973. “Notes on Sumerian lexicography, II.” Journal of Cuneiform Studies 25: 171–175.
- 1973. “From Enki’s headache to phonology.” Journal of Near Eastern Studies 32: 57–61.
- 1973. “The Sumerian writing system: Some problems.” Orientalia nova series, 42: 21–34.
- 1975. “Lexicography.” In Sumerological studies in honor of Thorkild Jacobsen, ed. S.J. Lieberman. pp. 123–157. Chicago: University of Chicago Press.
- 1976. “Notes on Sumerian lexicography, III.” Journal of Cuneiform Studies 28: 183–187.
- 1982. “Studies on Early Dynastic lexicography, I.” Oriens Antiquus 21: 1–26.
- 1983. “Early Dynastic spellings.” Oriens Antiquus 22: 1–5.
- 1983. “Enlil and Ninlil: The marriage of Sud.” Journal of the American Oriental Society 103: 43–64.
- 1984. “On some terms for “bat” in Mesopotamia.” Aula Orientalis 2: 5–9.
- 1984. “Bilingualism in logographically written languages: Sumerian in Ebla.” In Il bilinguismo a Ebla, ed. Luigi Cagni. pp. 75–97. Naples: Istituto Universitario Orientale.
- 1984. “Notes to the ‘Instructions of Šuruppak.’” Journal of Near Eastern Studies 43: 281–298.
- 1985. “On some texts mentioning Ur-Namma.” Orientalia nova series, 54: 27–45.
- 1985. “Sur les “livres d’écolier” à l’époque paléo-babylonienne.” pp. 67–78 in Miscellanea babylonica: Mélanges offerts à Maurice Birot, eds. J.-M. Durand and J.-R. Kupper. Paris: ÉRC.
- 1987. “Feeding Dumuzi’s sheep: The lexicon as a source of literary inspiration.” In Language, literature, and history: Philological and historical studies presented to Erica Reiner, ed. Francesca Rochberg-Halton. AOS 67. pp. 37–55. New Haven: American Oriental Society.
- 1987. “The early history of HAR-ra: The Ebla link.” In Ebla 1975-1985, ed. Luigi Cagni. pp. 131–158. Naples: Istituto Universitario Orientale.
- 1987.“Sumerian riddles: A corpus.” Aula Orientalis 5: 17–37.
- 1993. “On Mesopotamian jails and their lady warden.” In The tablet and the scroll: Near Eastern studies in honor of William W. Hallo, ed. Mark E. Cohen et al. pp. 72–78. Bethesda, Maryland: CDL Press.
- 1994. The Farmer’s Instructions. Sabadell: Ausa.
- 1996. “Literary text about Ur-Namma.” Aula Orientalis 14: 163–67.
- 1997. “The Instructions of king Ur-Ninurta: A new fragment.” Aula Orientalis 15: 43–53.
- 1999–2000. “Reading Gilgameš.” Aula Orientalis 17-18: 179–189.
- 2000 [2005]. “Modal prefixes.” Acta Sumerologica 22: 29–42.
- 2002. “The forerunners of marû and hamtu in Old Babylonian.” In Riches hidden in secret places: Ancient Near Eastern Studies in memory of Thorkild Jacobsen, ed. Tzvi Abusch. pp. 63–71. Winona Lake, Ind.: Eisenbrauns.
- 2008. The Early Dynastic Practical Vocabulary A (Archaic HAR-ra A). Rome: La Sapienza.
- 2010. The Lexical texts in the Schøyen Collection. Bethesda, Md.: CDL Press.
