= Giparu =

Sumerian concept

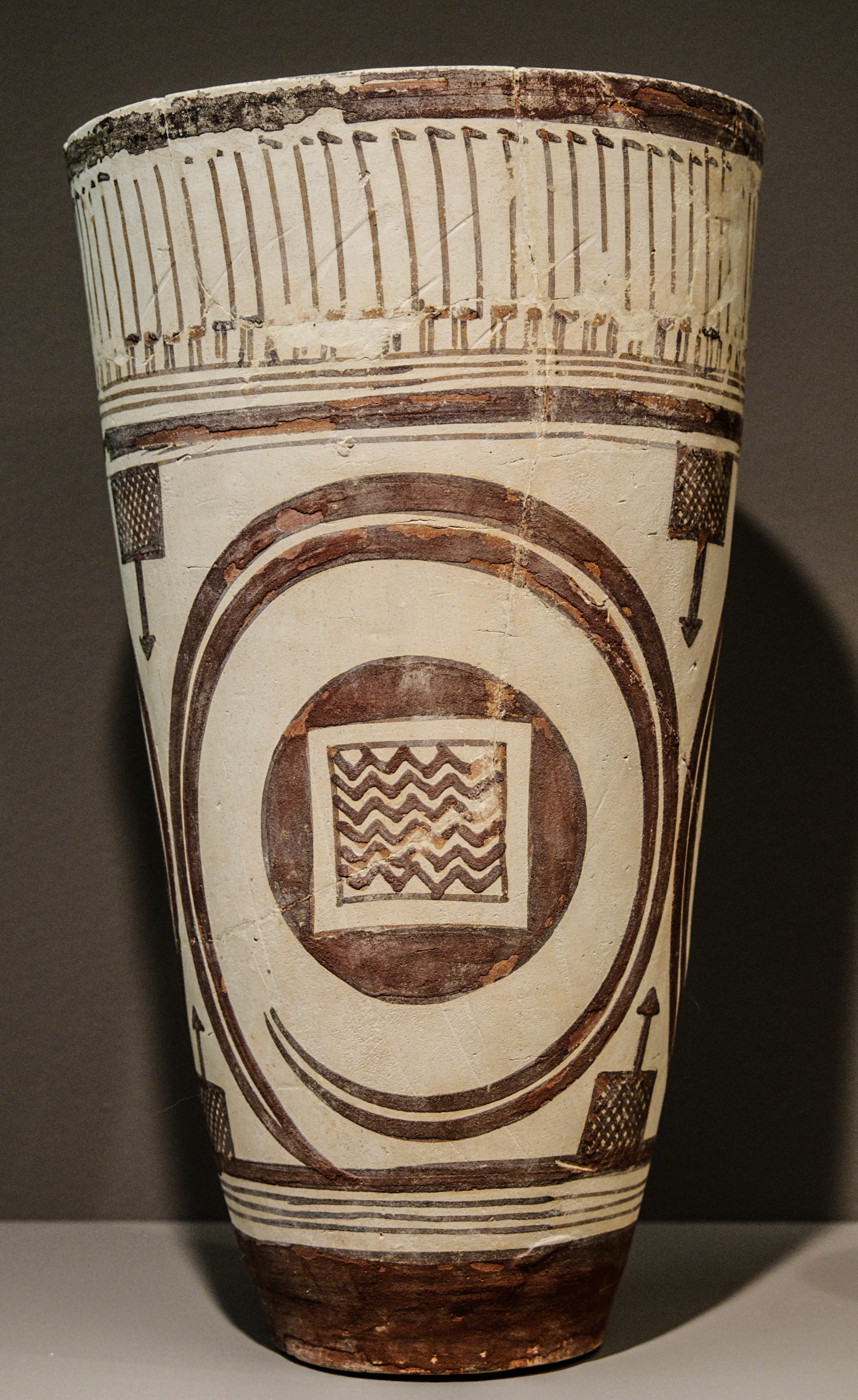
Stylized gipar reed mat on Susa redware from Jemdat Nasr Period

Giparu or, more correctly, gipar (Sumerian: ĝipar, Akkadian: gipāru) is a central concept of both the Sumerian belief system and temple architecture. Typically translated as 'cloister', the actual meaning of gipar includes multiple linked concepts. The giparu was originally a woven reed mat used as wedding bed. Its symbolic meaning expanded to include the idea of the generative power of fertility to create and sustain life. In this sense the giparu expressed multiple ideas of abundance, the storehouse containing abundance, as well as a point of union with the generative power itself. In its role as point of union, the giparu was residence of the en, where the hierosgamos was consummated. Often the giparu temple was built over a giparu mat embedded in the structure. For this reason, cloister, connoting the residence of a priest, is given as the primary definition (ePSD).

== Orthography ==
The cuneiform for giparu

The giparu is written with two forms attested back to 2500 BC.

- Main form: ĝi_{6}-par_{4} (Sign: MI.NI.GIŠ, Cuneiform: 𒈪𒉌𒄑)
- Variant form: ĝi_{6}-par_{3} (Signs: MI.DAG, Cuneiform: 𒈪𒁖)

The first Sign, MI, was developed from the pictogram of a storm cloud dropping rain. Cuneiform was initially written top to bottom then written rotated counter-clockwise 90 degrees later in history. The second Sign, NI was developed from a pictogram of plow.

Other variants in spelling come from the Ur expedition report, Royal Inscriptions from Ur.

- Inscription 67, line 7: "the brilliant gi(g)-par, her beloved temple"
- Inscription 67, line 7 footnote: "gi(g)-par-ku(g)-ga-ni"
- Inscription 106, line I4: "the e-gi(g)-par"

== In literature ==
The giparu of Inanna in Uruk is mentioned in Enmerkar and the lord of Aratta, lines 1–24: "Before the land of Dilmun yet existed, the E-ana of Unug Kulaba was well founded, and the holy ĝipar of Inana in brick-built Kulaba shone forth like the silver in the lode."

== Giparu ==
Often gipar is written as 'giparu' from the Akkadian giparū. In certain contexts giparu refers to a specific gipar in Ur where the entu (priestess) of the god Nanna dwelt. In this case giparu derives from gipar ku (Sumerian: ^{e_{2}}gi_{6}-par_{4}-ku_{3}), or Palace of the Gipar.

== Sources ==
- Charvát, Petr (2013), The Birth of the Ancient State: Ancient Egypt, Mesopotamia, India, and China, ISBN 9788024622149
- "ePSD". The Pennsylvania Sumerian Dictionary. June 26, 2006. Archived from the original on October 31, 2018.
- "Enmerkar and the lord of Aratta". Electronic Text Corpus of Sumerian Literature (ETCSL). November 30, 2016.
- Gadd, C. J. (1928), Ur Excavations Royal Inscriptions (PDF)
