= Women writers =

Women have made significant contributions to literature since the earliest written texts. Women have been at the forefront of textual communication since early civilizations.

== History ==
Among the first known female writers is Enheduanna; she is also the earliest known poet ever recorded. She was the High Priestess of the goddess Inanna and the moon god Nanna (Sin). She lived in the Sumerian city-state of Ur over 4,200 years ago. Enheduanna's contributions to Sumerian literature, definitively ascribed to her, include several personal devotions to Inanna and a collection of hymns known as the "Temple Hymns". Further additional texts are ascribed to her. This makes her the first named author in world history. She was the first known woman to hold the title of EN, a role of great political importance that was often held by royal daughters. She was appointed to the role by her father, King Sargon of Akkad. Her mother was probably Queen Tashlultum. Enheduanna was appointed to the role of High Priestess in a shrewd political move by Sargon to help secure power in the south of his kingdom, where the City of Ur was located.

=== 7th century BCE ===
==== Sappho ====
Sappho (/ˈsæfoʊ/; Aeolic Greek Ψαπφώ Psapphô; c. 630 – c. 570 BCE) was an archaic Greek poet from the island of Lesbos. Sappho is known for her lyric poetry, written to be sung while accompanied by a lyre. Most of Sappho's poetry is now lost, and what is extant has survived only in fragmentary form, except for one complete poem: the "Ode to Aphrodite". As well as lyric poetry, ancient commentators claimed that Sappho wrote elegiac and iambic poetry. Three epigrams attributed to Sappho are extant, but these are actually Hellenistic imitations of Sappho's style.

==== Avvaiyar ====
Avvaiyar was a Tamil poet who lived during the Sangam period is considered to be contemporary to poets Paranar, Kabilar and Thiruvalluvar. She is attributed as the author of 7 verses in Naṟṟiṇai, 15 in Kuṟuntokai, 4 in Akanaṉūṟu and 33 in Puṟanāṉūṟu. Legend states that she was a court poet of the rulers of the Tamil country. She travelled from one part of the country to another and from one village to another, sharing the gruel of the poor farmers and composing songs for their enjoyment. Most of her songs were about a small-time chieftain Vallal Athiyamaan Nedumaan Anji and his family. The chieftain had also used her as his ambassador to avert war with another neighbouring chieftain Thondaiman. The rest of her songs related to the various aspects of state governance.

=== 11th century ===
The Tale of Genji was written in the early 11th century by the noblewoman Murasaki Shikibu and is considered by some to be the first novel.

=== 12th century ===
Anna Komnene, the daughter of the Emperor Alexios I Komnenos, wrote Alexiad around 1148. It was written in a form of artificial Attic Greek. Anna described the political and military history of the Byzantine Empire during the reign of her father, thus providing a significant account on the Byzantium of the High Middle Ages. Among other topics, the Alexiad documents the Byzantine Empire's interaction with the Crusades and highlights the conflicting perceptions of the East and West in the early 12th century. It does not mention the schism of 1054 – a topic which is very common in contemporary writing. Nevertheless it successfully documents firsthand the decline of Byzantine cultural influence in both eastern and western Europe, particularly in the West's increasing involvement in its geographic sphere.

=== 15th century ===
Christine de Pizan was the best known late medieval French writer, rhetorician, and critic, who wrote Book of the City of Ladies in 1405, a text about an allegorical city in which independent women lived free from the slander of men. In her work she included real women artists, such as Anastasia, who was considered one of the best Parisian illuminators, although none of her work has survived. Other humanist texts led to increased education for Italian women.

The first known book in English by a woman was Revelations of Divine Love by Julian of Norwich. It was written between the fourteenth and fifteenth centuries and survived in various manuscripts until it was first published in 1670.

=== 16th century ===
Gulbadan Begum, daughter of Mughal's founding Emperor Babur wrote the biography of her brother, Emperor Humayun. Though only 8 when her father died, Gulbadan was asked years later by her nephew to write the story of her father and brother. Only one manuscript of her book, Humayunnama, has been found.

Rivka Bat Meir of Tikotin, or Tikiner, wrote "Meineket Rivka" in Yiddish which was published posthumously in 1608 Prague. The book was to be a source of sprititual sustenance for all Jewish women covering topics such as peity, proper child raring, physical cleanliness, etc. She also authored songs for Simchat Torah.

=== 18th century ===
Ann Radcliffe authored several novels of gothic fiction including The Mysteries of Udolpho published in 1794 and The Italian from 1797.

=== 19th century ===
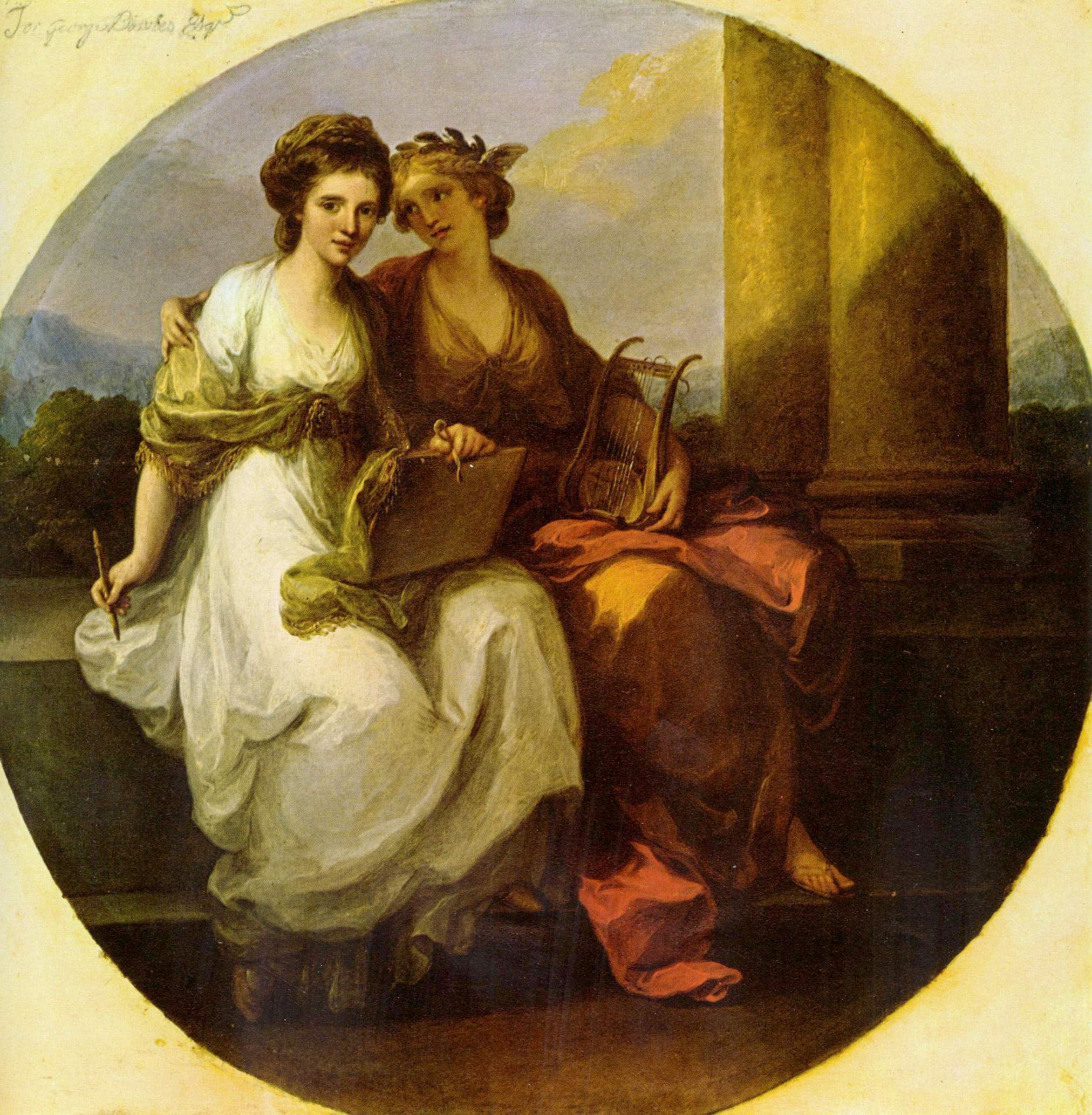
Angelica Kauffman, Literature and Painting, 1782, Kenwood House

One of the best known 19th-century female writers was Jane Austen, author of Sense and Sensibility (1811), Pride and Prejudice (1813), Mansfield Park (1814) and Emma (1816), who achieved success as a published writer. She wrote two additional novels, Northanger Abbey and Persuasion, both published posthumously in 1818, and began another, eventually titled Sanditon, but died before its completion.

Writers from this period include:

==== A-K ====
- Mercedes Laura Aguiar
- Mastoureh Ardalan
- Angélique Arnaud
- Caroline de Barrau

Gertrude Bell

- Anne Brontë
- Charlotte Brontë
- Emily Brontë
- Ada Buisson
- Anna Ciundziewicka
- Dilshad Barna
- Umihana Čuvidina
- Countess Dash

Rashha Esfahani, daughter of Hatef Esfahani (Persian poet)

- Mary Ann Evans, commonly known by her pen name George Eliot
- Nicole Garay
- María Josefa García Granados
- Gertrudis Gómez de Avellaneda,
- Zafer Hanım
- Julie Hausmann
- Bohuslava Kecková
- Lydia Koidula
- Hanna K. Korany
- Maria Konopnicka
- Eliška Krásnohorská

==== L-R ====
- Jeanne Lapauze
- Hermance Lesguillon
- Jeanne Marni
- Dada Masiti
- Emilie Maresse-Paul
- Marion A. McBride
- Athénaïs Michelet
- Maryam al-Nahhas
- Eugénie Niboyet
- Božena Němcová
- Nodira
- Virginia Elena Ortea
- Elise Otté
- Eliza Orzeszkowa
- Pavlina Pajk
- Eliška Pešková
- Gabriela Preissová
- Maria Rodziewiczówna
- Mary D. Rosengarten
- Lady Mary Wroth

==== S-Z ====
- Rosa Schapire
- Mary Shelley
- Staka Skenderova
- Milica Stojadinović-Srpkinja
- Lilli Suburg
- Bertha von Suttner
- Karolina Světlá
- Elizabeth Hart Thwaites
- Josefa Toledo de Aguerri
- Fatma Aliye Topuz
- Flora Tristan
- Lesya Ukrainka
- Salomé Ureña
- Jahonotin Uvaysiy
- Dolores Veintimilla

Jean Webster

- Mary Wollstonecraft
- Warda al-Yaziji
- Rosalind Amelia Young
- Gabriela Zapolska
- Narcyza Żmichowska

The followed is a list of interdisciplinary female writers of the 19th century:

- Kate Greenaway: writer, and illustrator, author (writer and designer) of two children's book illustrations; Marigold Garden (1875) and Under the Window (1879).
- Kate Bunce: was an English painter and poet associated with the Arts and Crafts movement.
- Elizabeth Siddal: English artist, poet, and artists' model.
- Delphine Arnould de Cool-Fortin: French painter and writer on Limoges porcelain.
- Dora d'Istria: painter, poet and writer.
- Milena Mrazović: journalist, writer, and piano composer.
- Aşıq Pəri: poet and folk singer.
- Josipina Turnograjska: writers, poets, and composer.
- Zoila Ugarte de Landívar: writer, journalist, sculptor, suffragist, and feminist.

=== Western American women writers ===
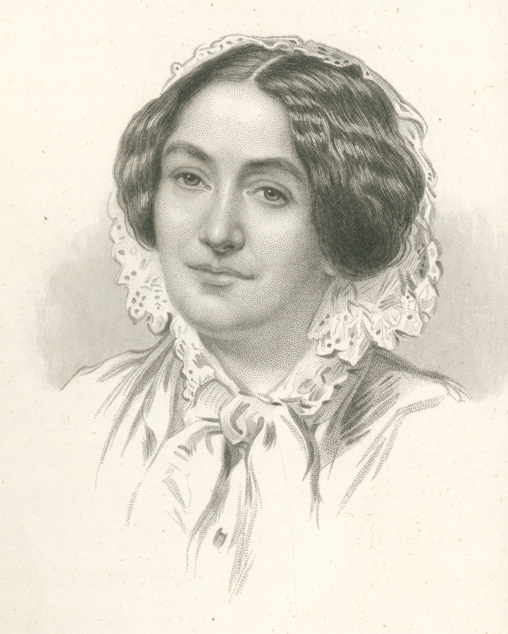
Caroline M. Kirkland

Western women writers have long been a marginalized group. 1979 was the first year an anthology on western American women writers was published. The Western Literature Association was founded in the 1960's to foster the work of contemporary women writers. There is little printed recordings on women's writing in the Western United States because establishing the field involved measures that were not seen as scholarly achievement. Caroline Kirkland, born in 1801, was considered the first women writer to confidently share the West. She wrote the novel, A New Home—Who'll Follow? after moving to the West with husband, William Kirkland. Published under the pseudonym Mary Clavers, the novel is a tale of the frontierswoman, and is important for its realism and celebration of the traditional female perspective.

=== Black women writers in the United States ===
Black women continued writing throughout the Great Depression to the 1960's. This was a time of abundance for black female writers, who received recognition like never before. They traveled for lecturing, reading and even made recordings of their work.

=== 20th century ===
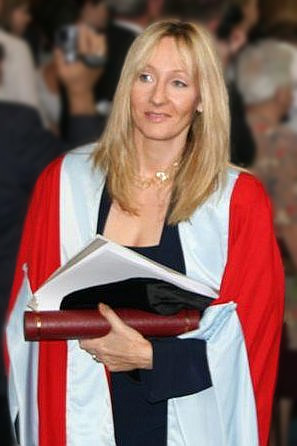
J.K. Rowling receives honorary degree from Aberdeen University in Scotland, July 6, 2006

In the 20th century women produced many books of all genres. Among fiction books can be named such titles as Harry Potter and The House of the Spirits, among others. The following is a list of female writers of the 20th century:

- Ayn Rand
- Kathy Acker
- Isabel Allende: Chilean writer.

Mahin Amid, Persian Poet

- Gloria E. Anzaldúa
- Matilde Asensi

Simin Behbahani, Persian poet, twice nominated for Noble prize in literature

- Lucia Berlin
- Octavia E. Butler
- Rosario Castellanos Figueroa

Agatha Christie

Simin Daneshvar, Persian Author

- Amparo Dávila

Simone de Beauvoir, 3x noble nominations

Parvin Dowlatabadi, Persian poet and author of Children books

Daphne Du Maurier

- Guadalupe Dueñas
- María Dueñas
- Diamela Eltit

Parvin E'Tesami, Persian poet

Oriana Falaci

Forough Farrokhzad, Persian poet

- Espido Freire
- Gloria Fuertes

Martha Ellis Gellhorn

Natalia Ginzburg

- Almudena Grandes

Roya Hakakian

- Joy Harjo

Louise Hay

Mary Welsh Hemingway

- Clara Janés
- Carmen Laforet
- Elvira Lindo
- Clarice Lispector
- Leslie Marmon Silko

Anne Morrow Lindbergh

- Carmen Martín Gaite
- Ana María Matute

Margaret Mitchell

- Rosa Montero
- Toni Morrison

Gina B. Nahai

- Silvina Ocampo
- Flannery O'Connor
- Alejandra Pizarnik
- Sylvia Plath
- Soledad Puértolas
- Claudia Rankine
- J. K. Rowling: Author of Harry Potter series.

Homa Sarshar

Farideh Seddighim, Author of children and adult books

Annemarie Selinko

- Mahmuda Khatun Siddiqua
- Maruja Torres
- Jeanette Winterson

Virginia Woolf

== Women awarded the Nobel Prize in Literature ==
The following women have won the Nobel Prize in Literature:

- Selma Lagerlöf
- Grazia Deledda
- Sigrid Undset
- Pearl S. Buck
- Gabriela Mistral
- Nelly Sachs
- Nadine Gordimer
- Toni Morrison
- Wisława Szymborska
- Elfriede Jelinek
- Doris Lessing
- Herta Müller
- Alice Munro
- Svetlana Alexievich
- Olga Tokarczuk
- Louise Glück
- Annie Ernaux
- Han Kang

== See also ==
- Scientific writing
- Women's writing (literary category)
- List of women writers
- Women letter writers
- Women in science
- Women artists
