= Anne Gilbert =

Anne Gilbert may refer to:

- Anne Hart Gilbert (1768–1834), Methodist writer, teacher and abolitionist
- Anne Hartley Gilbert (1821–1904), British-American actress
- Ann Getty (1941–2020), née Gilbert, American philanthropist and publisher
- Anne Yvonne Gilbert, British artist and book illustrator

== See also ==
- Anne & Gilbert, a 2005 musical based on the Anne of Green Gables series of books
- Anna Gilbert (disambiguation)
