= Anna Gilbert =

Anna Gilbert may refer to:

- Anna Gilbert (novelist), pseudonym of British writer Marguerite J. Gascoigne (1916–2004)
- Anna Gilbert (musician) (born 1982), American singer/songwriter
- Anna C. Gilbert (born 1972), American mathematician
- Anna Gilbert (1812–1873), wife of Joseph Gilbert
- Anna Gilbert, wife of Connecticut Governor James L. Howard (1818–1906)
- Anna Gilbert, wife of Andrew Cowan
- Anna Gilbert, actress in silent film Partners Again (1926)
- Anna Gilbert, actress in British television series Whizziwig (1998–2000)

== See also ==
- Anne Gilbert (disambiguation)
