= Mary Richardson (disambiguation) =

Mary Richardson (1882/1883–1961) was a suffragette in the UK.

Mary Richardson may also refer to:

- Dame Mary Richardson (British educator) (born 1936), British headteacher and educationist
- Mary Curtis Richardson (1848–1931), American impressionist painter
- Mary D. Richardson, birth name of Mary D. Rosengarten (1846–1913), American writer
- Mary Jane Richardson Jones (1819–1910), American abolitionist, suffragist, and activist
- Mary Margaret Richardson (1943–2021), American tax lawyer
- Mary Richardson Kennedy (1959–2012), wife of Robert F. Kennedy Jr.
- Mary Klicka (born Mary Victoria Richardson; 1921–2007), Canadian-American dietitian
