= Azupiranu =

Purported settlement in ancient Mesopotamia

Azupiranu (𒌑𒄯𒊕 / Šamḫurrēšu) was a place described to be a city or a town in ancient Mesopotamia. In a Neo-Assyrian text purporting to be the autobiography of Sargon of Akkad, Azupiranu is named as Sargon's birthplace and described as "situated on the banks of the Euphrates." Azupiranu is an Akkadian name meaning "city of saffron". Gwendolyn Leick points out that the name is just a general name for a mountainous area in the north where the azupiranu herbs grow.
