= Shu-Enlil =

- Years active: c. 2275 BC
- Children: Ali-ahum
- Parent(s): Sargon, Tashlultum

Shu-Enlil (also known as Ibarum; fl. c. 2275 BC) was a son of Sargon of Akkad, first king of Akkad.

== See also ==
- Eber
- Ibrium
- Ibrahim (disambiguation)
- Abraham (disambiguation)
