= Narciso Garay =

Panamanian violinist, composer, and political figure

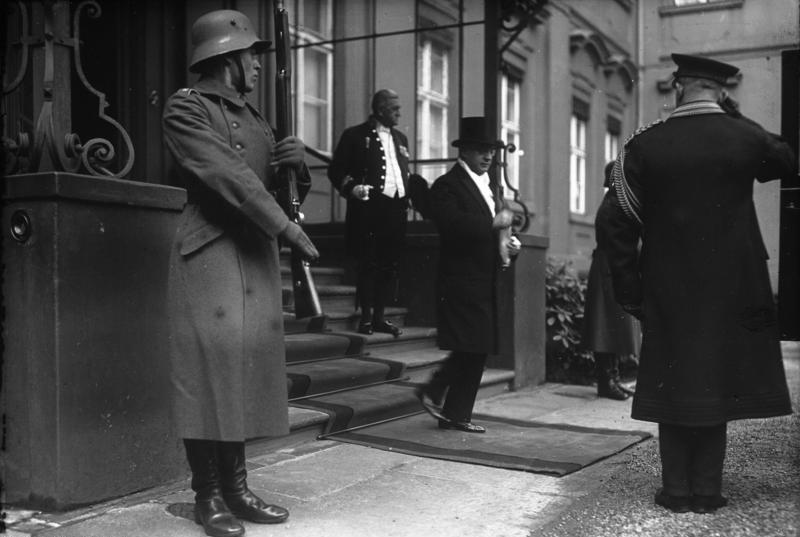
Garay in 1929, during his ambassadorship to Germany

Narciso Garay Díaz (June 12, 1876 – March 27, 1953) was a Panamanian violinist, composer, and political figure.

Born in Panama City, Garay was the son of painter Epifanio Garay; his sister was the poet Nicole Garay. He studied at the Royal Conservatory of Brussels, where he took a first prize, and at the Schola Cantorum de Paris, and from 1902 until 1903 was a pupil of Gabriel Fauré. Returning to Panama, he became director of the new Escuela Nacional de Música, occupying the position from 1904 until 1918. Active as an ethnomusicologist, he published Tradiciones y cantares de Panama in 1930; his compositions include a sonata for violin. Active as well in the diplomatic service, at one time he served as Minister of Foreign Affairs. He died in the city of his birth.
