= Tashlultum =

Queen consort of Akkad
- Reign: c. 2300 BC
- King: Sargon
- Spouse: Sargon

Tashlultum (fl. c. 2300 BC) was a wife of King Sargon of Akkad. Her name is known to archaeology only from a single shard of an alabaster vase or bowl with an inscription indicating it was dedicated to the temple by her steward/scribe. This dedication provides insight into the position and features of Akkadian queenship: it is notable that Tashlultum had staff which included men, and these men were learned officials.

From this, it has been assumed (for lack of any conflicting information) that she was queen of Akkad and the mother of Sargon's children Enheduanna, Rimush, Manishtushu, Shu-Enlil, and Ilaba'is-takal.

== Bibliography ==
- Elisabeth Meier Tetlow (2004). Women, Crime, and Punishment in Ancient Law and Society: The ancient Near East. Continuum International Publishing Group.
- Michael D. Roaf (1992). Mesopotamia and the ancient Near East. Stonehenge Press.
