= Sargon of Akkad =

Founder of the Akkadian Empire

Sargon of Akkad 𒊬𒊒𒄀
- King of Sumer; King of the Universe
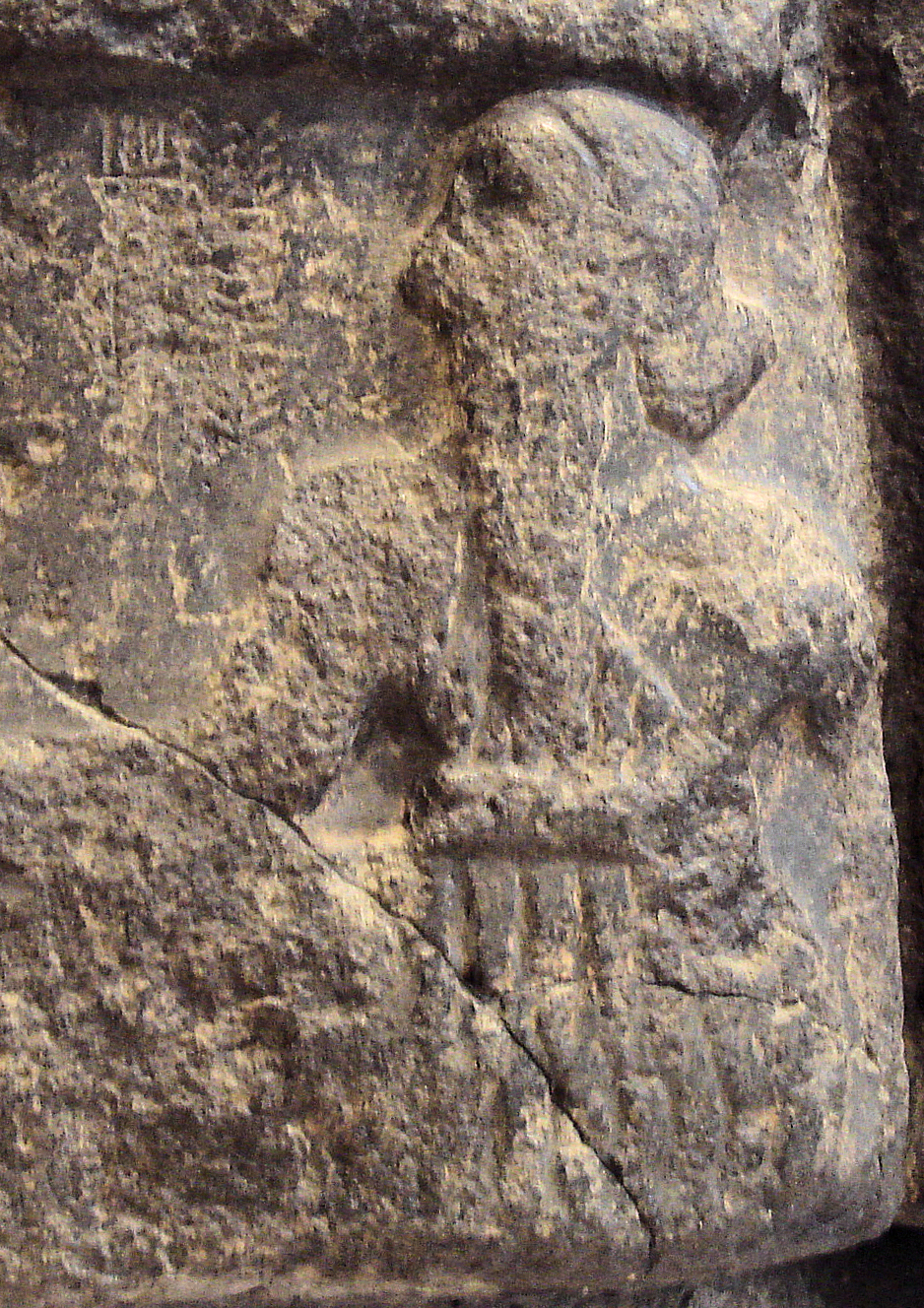
- Sargon of Akkad on his victory stele, with inscription "King Sargon" (𒊬𒊒𒄀 𒈗 Šar-ru-gi lugal) vertically inscribed in front of him (see later image for detail)

King of Akkad
- Reign: c. 2334 – c. 2279 BC
- Predecessor: Monarchy established
- Successor: Rimush
- Died: c. 2279 BC; Akkadian Empire
- Spouse: Tashlultum
- Issue: Manishtushu; Rimush; Enheduanna; Shu-Enlil; Abaish-Takal
- Dynasty: Akkadian (Sargonic)
- Father: Possibly La'ibum

Sargon of Akkad (/ˈsɑːrɡɒn/; Akkadian: 𒊬𒊒𒄀, romanized: Šarrugi; died c. 2279 BC), also known as Sargon the Great, was the founder of the Akkadian Empire (also labelled 'Sargonic', after him), known for his conquests of the Sumerian city-states, around 2300 BC. He is sometimes identified as the first person in recorded history to rule over an empire. The dates of his reign, which are uncertain, are often estimated to be between 2334 and 2279 BC, but a more recent proposal places it in the period from 2316 to 2277 BC.

His reign remains relatively poorly understood, as historians have only a few commemorative inscriptions that can be reliably dated to Sargon’s reign (most of which are known from later copies) and few archives from his time. The literary texts written after Sargon’s death with the aim of glorifying him undoubtedly contain a core of historical truth, but it is difficult to separate fact from fiction. He was a ruler of the small city of Akkad, located in central Mesopotamia, which lay in the shadow of its most-powerful neighbor, Kish. Under circumstances that remain unclear, Sargon managed to overthrow the established order and established himself as the ruler of the northern part of Lower Mesopotamia at the end of the 24th century B.C. He then confronted and defeated Lugal-zage-si, the king of Uruk, who ruled the southern part of that same region—the land of Sumer—which subsequently came under Akkadian control. He then undertook successful military expeditions toward the Iranian Plateau to the east (notably into Elam) and toward Syria to the west (Mari), though he did not incorporate these territories into his kingdom. His reign clearly marked a turning point in the history of this region, especially since his immediate successors would carry on his legacy for at least a century, thereby establishing what is generally considered the first 'imperial' experiment in history.

Sargon’s reign also made a strong impression on his contemporaries, and his memory has been preserved by future generations of Mesopotamian civilization, who have woven legends about him, some of them based at least in some part on feats he actually accomplished, but with a major part of invention. Stories have thus been told about his birth, his rise to power, and some of his military campaigns. Sargon of Akkad has thus become one of the major figures in Mesopotamian history, generally regarded as the archetype of the conquering ruler.

== Name ==
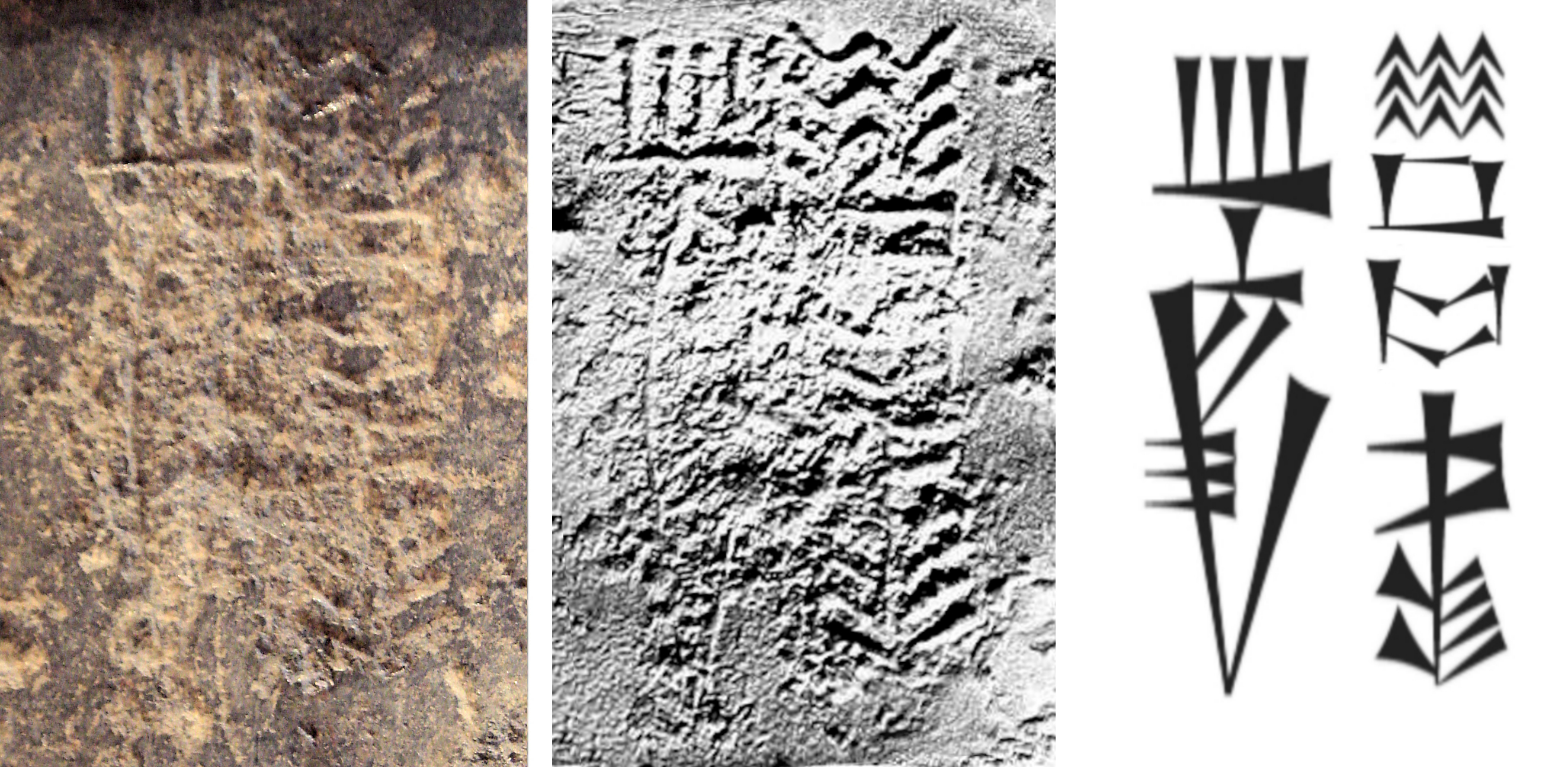
"King Sargon" (𒊬𒊒𒄀 𒈗 Šar-ru-gi lugal) on the Victory stele of Sargon

The name Sargon is in Old Akkadian, the language of the Akkadian period, śarru(m)-kēn. In the cuneiform script of the time, it is written as śar-ru-GI or šar-ru-Gi. In subsequent periods, the Akkadian name was normalized as either Šarru-kīn or Šarru-kēn. The name's cuneiform spelling is variously šar-ru-gen_{6}, šar-ru-ki-in, šar-ru-um-ki-in. In Old Babylonian tablets relating the legends of Sargon, his name is transcribed as 𒊬𒊒𒌝𒄀𒅔 (Šar-ru-um-ki-in). In Late Assyrian references, the name is mostly spelled as LUGAL-GI.NA or LUGAL-GIN, i.e. identical to the name of the Neo-Assyrian king Sargon II. The modern spelling Sargon is derived from the single mention of the name (in reference to Sargon II) in the Hebrew Bible, as סַרְגוֹן, in Isaiah 20:1.

The first element in the name is šarru, the Akkadian (East Semitic) for "king" (cf. Hebrew śar שַׂר). Until Sargon, this term does not seem to have been commonly used to form personal names in Akkadian. Its Sumerian equivalent, lugal, was however often used in personal names. The second element is derived either from the verb kânu "to confirm, establish" (cognate to Hebrew kūn כּוּן), or from the related adjective kēnu "authentic, legitimate".; other translations are "true," "reliable," "just," "honest," "decent," "loyal," "correct," "regular," "firm (in place)," etc.

Who is the 'King' referred to by this name? According to some, it is Sargon himself. This would mean that he changed his name upon assuming power, adopting what is known as a “throne name,” which would the be different from his birth name. However, this practice is not attested for this period and did not become common in Mesopotamia until a millennium later. On the other hand, if Sargon had borne the same name since birth, then the “King” referred to in the name would refer to the ruler who reigned at the time of his birth, seeking to bestow his blessing upon him. This practice is common in Akkadian personal names from later periods. It has also been suggested that the “King” is in fact a deity.

The reading Šarru-kēn has been interpreted adjectivally, as "the king is established; legitimate", expanded as a phrase šarrum ki(e)num. The interpretation “Legitimate king” amounts to acknowledging that this is a programmatic "throne name", intended to legitimize the king's position, in an effort to make people forget that he is a usurper. If it is a birth name, it could mean “the King is true (to his word)”, or “the King is just.”

The terms "Pre-Sargonic" and "Post-Sargonic" were used in Assyriology based on the chronologies of Nabonidus before the historical existence of Sargon of Akkad was confirmed. The form Šarru-ukīn was known from the Assyrian Sargon Legend discovered in 1867 in Library of Ashurbanipal at Nineveh. A contemporary reference to Sargon thought to have been found on the cylinder seal of Ibni-sharru, a high-ranking official serving under Sargon. Joachim Menant published a description of this seal in 1877, reading the king's name as Shegani-shar-lukh, and did not yet identify it with "Sargon the Elder" (who was identified with the Old Assyrian king Sargon I). In 1883, the British Museum acquired the "mace-head of Shar-Gani-sharri", a votive gift deposited at the temple of Shamash in Sippar. This "Shar-Gani" was identified with the Sargon of Agade of Assyrian legend. The identification of "Shar-Gani-sharri" with Sargon was recognised as mistaken in the 1910s. Shar-Gani-sharri (Shar-Kali-Sharri) is, in fact, Sargon's great-grandson, the successor of Naram-Sin.

It is not entirely clear whether the Neo-Assyrian king Sargon II was directly named for Sargon of Akkad, as there is some uncertainty whether his name should be rendered Šarru-ukīn or as Šarru-kēn(u).

== Sources ==
Victory stele of Sargon

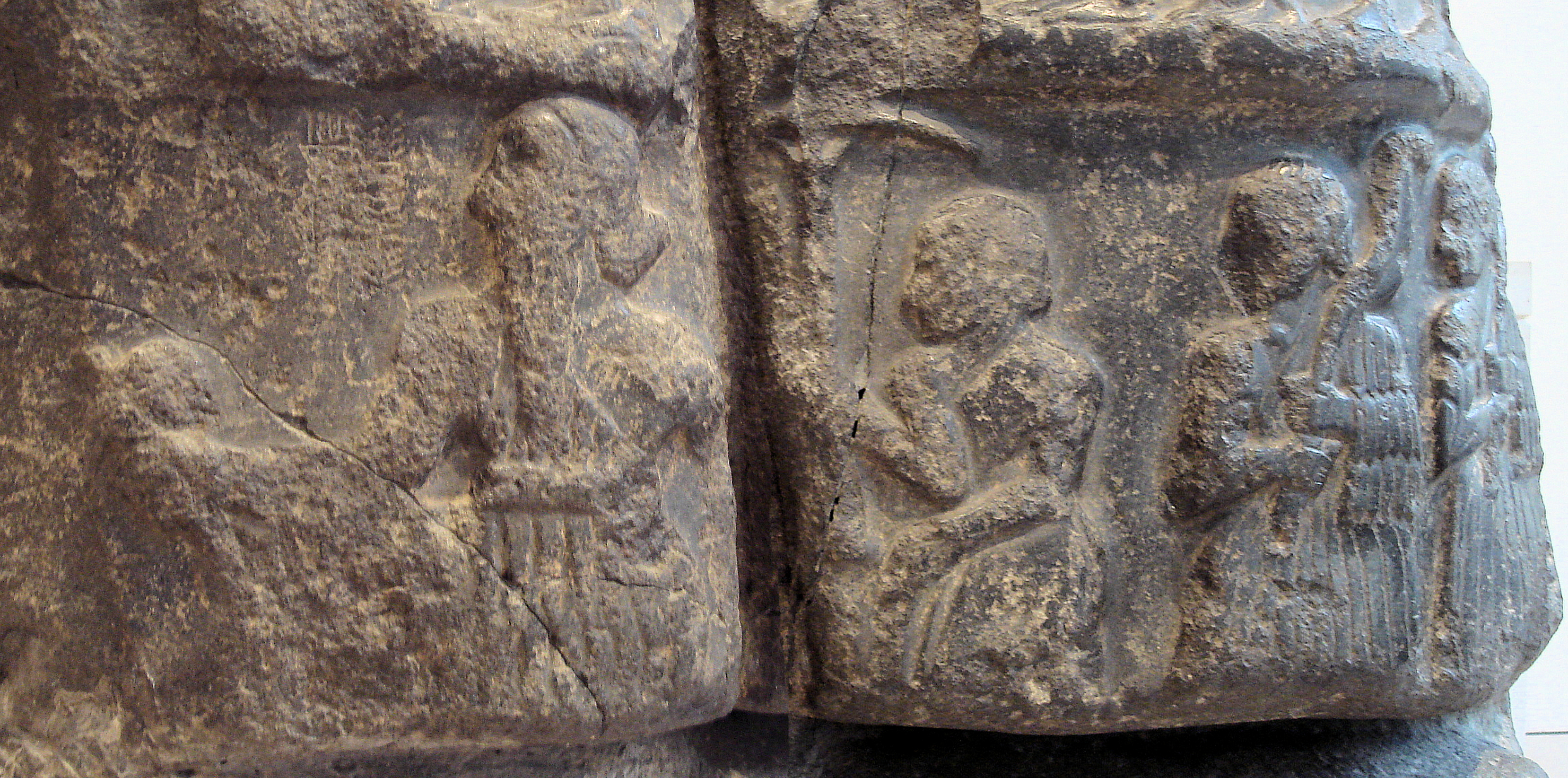
The stele, with Sargon leading a procession

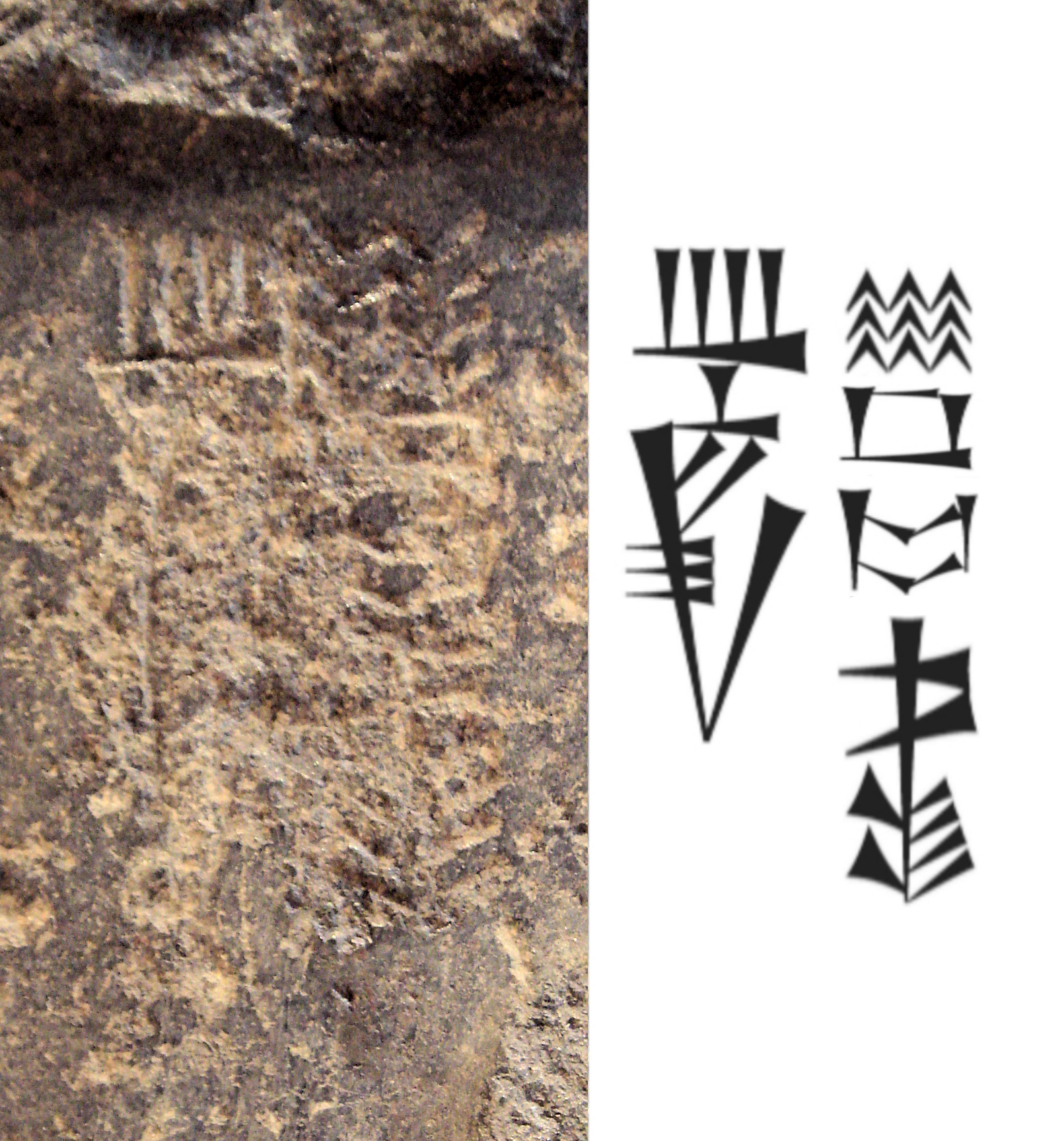
"King Sargon"

Fragment of the Victory Stele of Sargon, showing Sargon with a royal hair bun, holding a mace and wearing a kaunakes flounced royal coat on his left shoulder with a large belt (left), followed by an attendant holding a royal umbrella (center) and a procession of dignitaries holding weapons. The name of Sargon in cuneiform (Akkadian: 𒊬𒊒𒄀 𒈗 Šar-ru-gi lugal "King Sargon") appears faintly in front of his face. Clothing is comparable to those seen on the cylinder seal of Kalki, in which appears the likely brother of Sargon. Circa 2300 BC. Louvre Museum.

=== Contemporary texts ===
Few primary sources dating from the time of Sargon's reign are known. These include some original royal inscriptions written on monuments unearthed at archaeological sites, especially Susa (ancient Elam, present-day Iran) where they were taken as booty more than a millennium after Sargon's reign. Several of his inscriptions were also copied by scribes onto cuneiform tablets after his death, particularly during the early 2nd millennium BC. This applies especially to those made on monuments displayed at Nippur, in the courtyard of the temple of Enlil, which were still present half a millennium after they were written (and which have since disappeared). They contain information about his military conquests, but do not present detailed accounts of the events. The copy tablets also include information about the visual aspect of the monuments on which the texts were inscribed (type, location of the inscriptions, images).

Among the texts commemorating the king's accomplishments are also year names: following a practice that became widespread at this time to differentiate between years, a year was given a name in reference to a major event that occurred the previous year. These names are used to date some administrative documents, and this is how historians generally identify them. This can be very useful for reconstructing the sequence of events of a reign, provided that all (or at least most) of a king's year names are known and that it is possible to put them in order. However, this is not the case for Sargon: only four year names are known for his reign (which is credited with at least 40 years). They all commemorate military victories, which are also mentioned in royal inscriptions.

Also dating from the reign of Sargon are archival documents, cuneiform tablets, mostly from Adab, Umma and Nippur.

=== Pseudo-historical texts ===
Written sources composed after Sargon's reign attest to the emergence of a legendary, or 'pseudo-historical', tradition rewriting his accomplishments or elaborating new ones (this type of text also refers to his grandson Naram-Sin). They primarily provide information about their time of composition, particularly regarding the ideology of kingship. Their usefulness in reconstructing the history of the Akkadian Empire is debated. It has been noted that these traditions have even influenced the image of this period among modern historians, who have often tended to rely too heavily on them to study the reigns of Akkadian kings, or even to adopt, without the necessary critical distance, the 'heroic' and 'imperial' vision of the period they convey. It is now recognized that it is difficult, but not necessarily impossible, to regard them as reliable historical sources and use them to reconstruct Sargon's reign. At least in some cases they are based on some truth, since some of these texts are inspired by commemorative inscriptions. But they also include a large number of imaginary events invented centuries after his death. Some historians ignore them when it comes to reconstructing the history of the Akkadian Empire, while others consider it necessary to continue using them, but with caution.

=== Non-textual sources ===
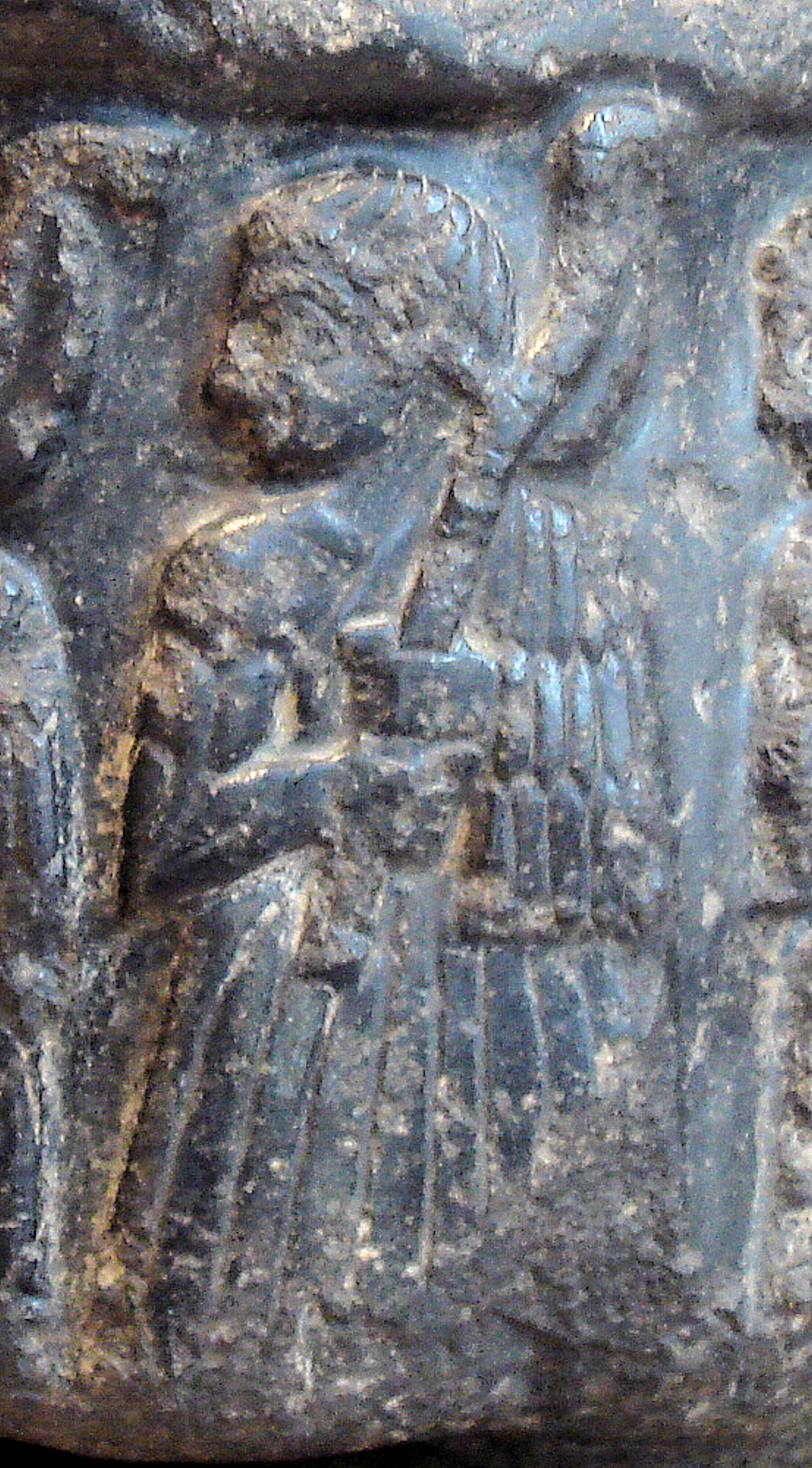
Akkadian official in the retinue of Sargon of Akkad, holding an axe

Non-textual sources are very few. Among the sculptures datable to the early Akkadian period by their style, only one fragmentary stela bears an inscription in the name of Sargon. One or two others may date from his reign, but do not mention the king that would confirm indeed belong to that period.

In archaeology, the beginning of the Akkadian period (the reign of Sargon and his two successors Rimush and Manishtushu) cannot be distinguished from the end of the Early Dynastic period based on material criteria in the stratigraphic levels of Mesopotamian sites. Without epigraphic finds, it is impossible to date them more precisely.

== Chronology ==
Various copies of the Sumerian King List give the duration of his reign as either 40 or 54–56 years. Only a few contemporary inscriptions relating to Sargon exist, though there are a number of Old Babylonian period texts that purport to be copies of earlier inscriptions of Sargon. It is impossible to confirm this due to a lack of additional sources.

Since it is unknown when he ascended the throne, and given the uncertainty regarding the length of his reign, the dates of his reign in absolute years proposed by historians are only approximate: c. 2334-2279 BC, 2324-2285 BC, or 2316-2277 BC in the middle chronology.

It is unknown at what point in his reign the events mentioned in the king's inscriptions took place, notably his victory against Lugal-zage-si, which is a pivotal moment.

=== Year names ===
While various copies of the Sumerian king list and later Babylonian chronicles credit Sargon with a reign length ranging from 34 to 56 years, dated documents have been found for only four different year-names of his actual reign. The names of these four years describe his campaigns against Elam, Mari, Simurrum, and Uru'a/Arawa (in western Elam).

- Year in which Sargon went to Simurrum
- Year in which Sargon destroyed Uru'a/Arawa (in westernmost portion of Elam)
- Year in which Sargon destroyed Elam
- Year in which Mari was destroyed

— Known regnal year names of Sargon.

== Family ==
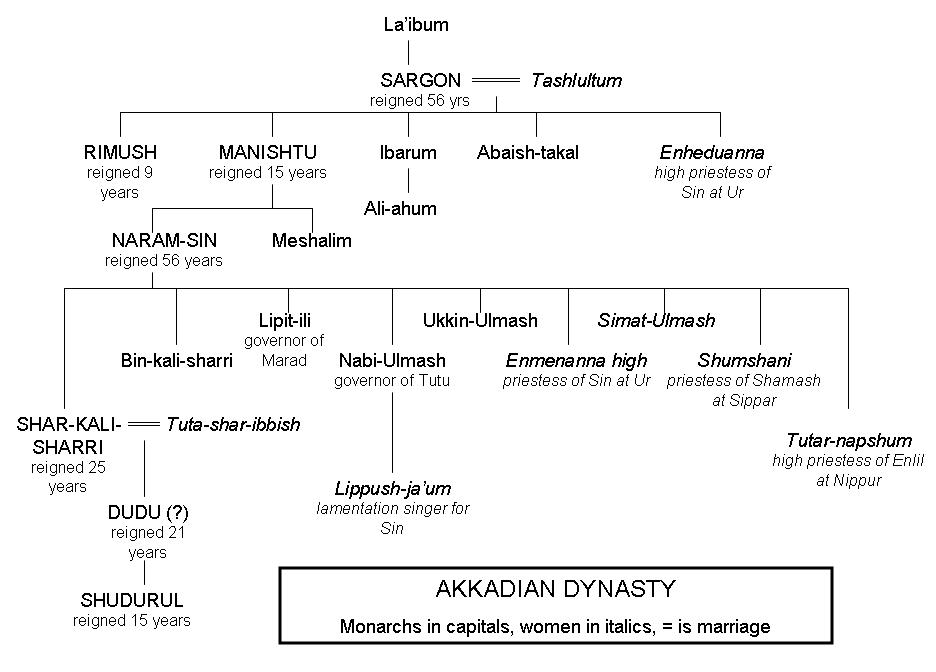
Family tree of Sargon of Akkad

Like the other kings of the Akkadian dynasty, Sargon does not mention his father in his inscriptions. His parentage therefore remain unknown. According to the Sumerian Sargon Legend, written long after his death, his father was a man named La’ipum. The name of Sargon's main wife, Queen Tashlultum, those of a number of his children, and of a likely brother, called Ūbil-Aštar or Ubil-Eshtar, are known to us. His daughter Enheduanna was a high priestess of the moon God in Ur who composed ritual hymns. Many of her works, including her Exaltation of Inanna, were in use for centuries thereafter. Sargon was succeeded by his son Rimush; after Rimush's death another son, Manishtushu, became king. Manishtushu would be succeeded by his own son, Naram-Sin. Two other sons, Shu-Enlil (Ibarum) and Ilaba'is-takal (Abaish-Takal), are known.

== Conquests ==
=== Background ===
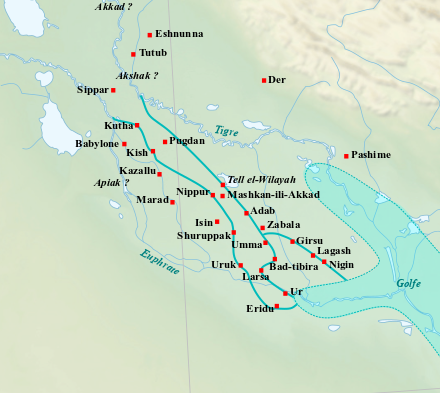
Location of the main sites of southern Mesopotamia during the Akkadian period.

Sargon's reign began during the end of the Early Dynastic period, specifically its final phase (labelled ED III B, ca. 2500-2300 BC). Lower Mesopotamia was then characterized by a political division among several small kingdoms organized around a main city and other settlements, commonly referred to as "city-states." Linguistically, the southern part of the region was populated by Sumerian speakers, while the north was inhabited by Akkadian speakers. This distinction appears to have been reflected to some extent in the political and cultural spheres, although it is not clear whether it also manifested itself in ethnic divisions. The 24th millennium BC is marked by several major political and military developments: conflicts between kingdoms are increasingly common, even almost permanent; some kingdoms have acquired the means to conduct expeditions which take them far from their bases; the idea of unification of Lower Mesopotamia seems to appear, in particular around the cities of Uruk, Ur and Umma whose kings carry out conquests greater than their predecessors, which has been described as a 'proto-imperial' dynamic. Enshakushana of Uruk (c. 2350 BCE) was the first to establish a large political entity, and his legacy was then taken up by Lugal-zage-si (ca. 2340–2316 BC or later), a king based first in Umma and then in Uruk. He notably subjugated the kingdoms of Lagash and Adab, and dominated the holy city of Nippur. The southern part of Lower Mesopotamia, the land of Sumer, was thus placed under his control..

The political situation in the northern part of Lower Mesopotamia and Central Mesopotamia, from which Sargon emerged, is very poorly understood. This country, whose population was predominantly Akkadian-speaking, was dominated by the city of Kish at the beginning of the ED III period. Enshakushana of Uruk proclaimed that he had conquered this city, as well as another powerful kingdom in the region, Akshak. This conflict may also have involved the Syrian kingdoms of Ebla and Mari, rivals of each other, the former being allied with Kish and the latter with Uruk. In any case, Kish's power had diminished by the beginning of Sargon's reign.

=== Origins and Rise to Power ===
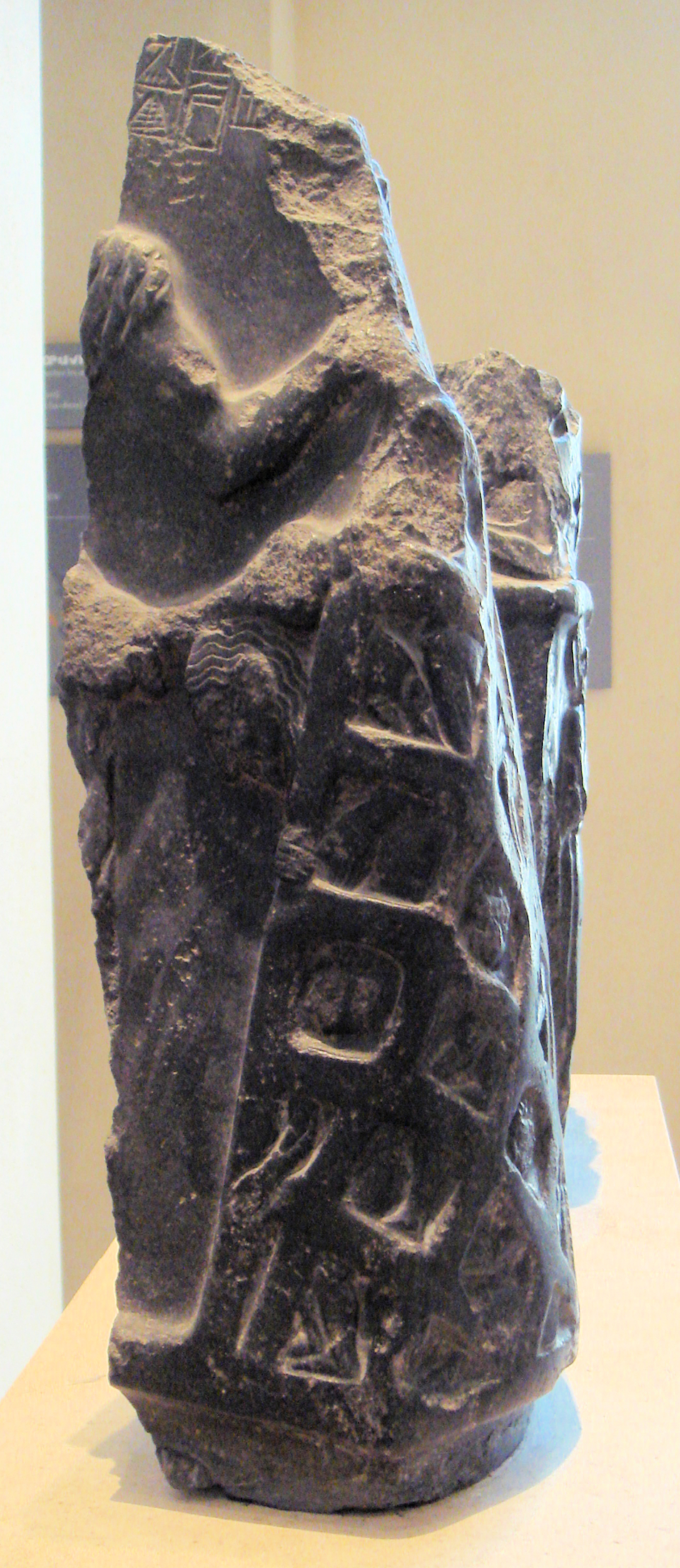
Fragment of a stele from the early Akkadian Empire, possibly from the reign of Sargon: a king holds enemy prisoners in a net. Susa, Louvre Museum.

Sargon emerges in Central Mesopotamia, probably as ruler of the city of Akkad (or Agade). The exact location of this city is unknown, but it should be located in the region of the confluence of the Tigris and the Adhem River (south of present-day Samarra), or further down towards present-day Baghdad (confluence of the Tigris and the Diyala River), north of the kingdoms of Kish and Akshak. It is therefore in this region, between the Tigris, the Adhem, and the Diyala, called Wari'um or Uri in ancient texts, that the territory dominated by Sargon in the early years of his reign should be located. In any case, Akkad is clearly not a foundation of this king, contrary to what a literary tradition claims. However, it probably does not have an ancient history: its name certainly appears in some sources directly preceding the time of Sargon's conquests (notably an archive of Khafajah, ancient Tutub), but it does not seem to have played a significant political role until then.

The first part of Sargon's reign, before his victory against Lugal-zagesi around 2300 BC, remains obscure due to a lack of contemporary sources. We do not know who his father was, whether he was of royal descent (several texts after his reign state that he was not, but this cannot be confirmed), and therefore whether he began his reign as king of the city of Akkad or whether he conquered it. He is thought to have reigned for at least 18 years before controlling Lower Mesopotamia, according to estimates by Sallaberger and Schrakamp.

It is not known exactly when and how Sargon ascended the throne of Akkad, nor under what circumstances the northern regions of Lower Mesopotamia, formerly under the hegemony of Kish, came under his control. A tradition, dating from much later than these events and recounted in the Sumerian King List and the Sumerian legend of Sargon, portrays him as a usurper who began his career as cupbearer to King Ur-Zababa of Kish. According to the Sumerian legend, he overthrew him; however, according to the King List, five other kings of Kish reigned between them, but Sargon is indeed credited with ending Kish's rule. Moreover, among the titles that Sargon gives himself in his own inscriptions, the most common is that of "king of Kish."

Based on these different elements, some historians have suggested that there is a trace of historical reality in this tradition: Sargon was originally a vassal king of Kish (whether Ur-Zababa or someone else), who successfully rebelled against his overlord and thus became the master of this city and at the same time the overlord of northern Lower Mesopotamia. Given the fictional nature of these legends, such a scenario remains highly hypothetical. These traditions portraying Sargon as a figure who came out of nowhere may stem from the fact that his rise and that of Akkad were perceived as unexpected, novel, or even an anomaly. At the very least, the decline of Kish is corroborated by contemporary textual sources, as well as destruction at the archaeological site, and provided Sargon with the opportunity to take his place.

There may be indirect references to Sargon in contemporary sources. A year name of Enshakushana seems to allude to a victory against Akkad (around 2310 BC), without naming the king then ruling the city, who could well already be Sargon. The fact that the event was deemed worthy of naming a year implies that the city had by then become a significant adversary. Other potential sources on Akkad before Sargon's conquests are difficult to date. Tablets unearthed at Ebla and dating from the period preceding the destruction of the city mention exchanges of gifts with a king of Kish, who has been proposed to be identified as Sargon.

=== The Conquest of Sumer ===
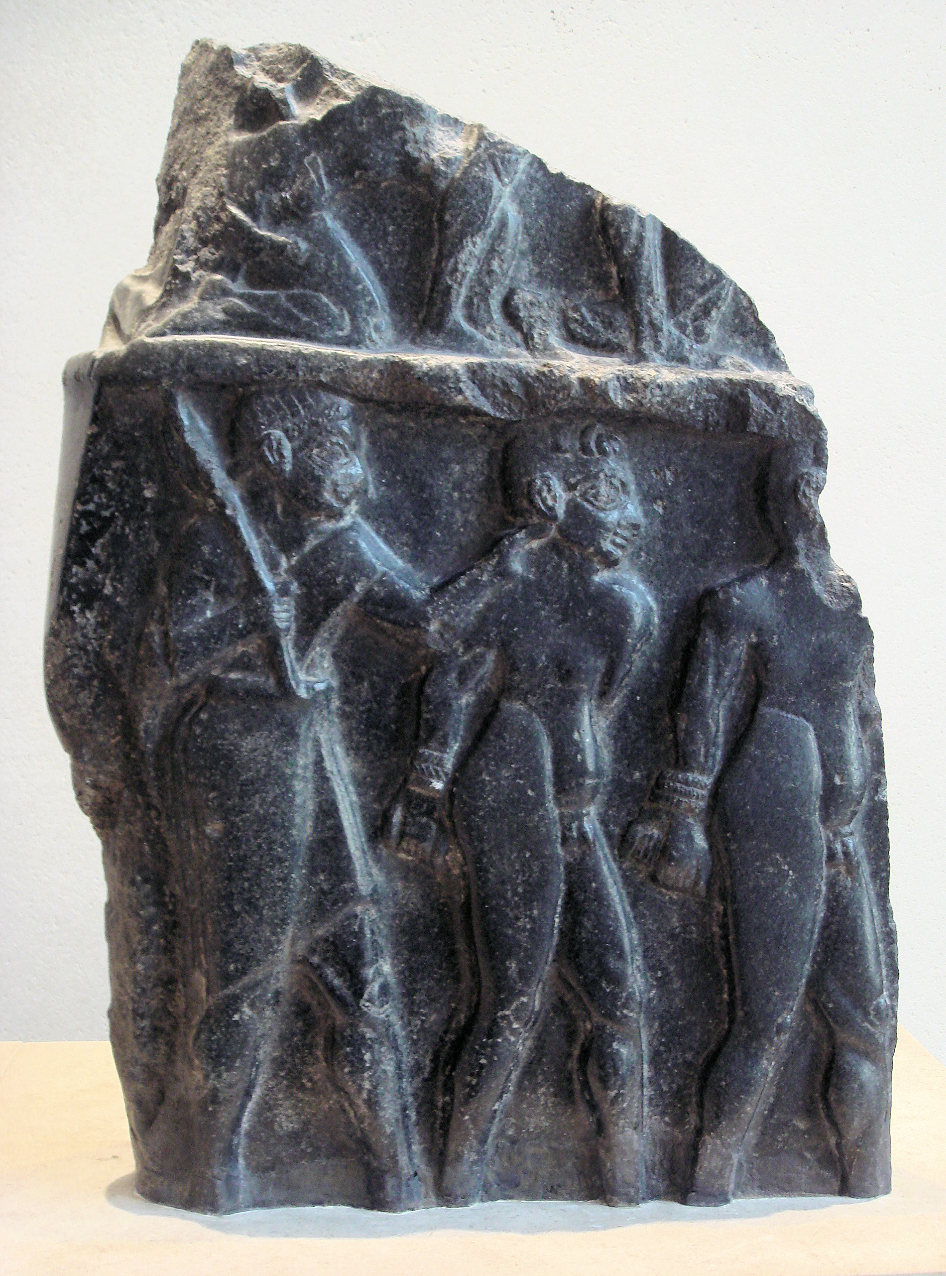
Prisoners escorted by a soldier, on a victory stele of Sargon of Akkad, c. 2300 BC. Probably from the end of Sargon's reign. The hairstyle of the prisoners (curly hair on top and short hair on the sides) is characteristic of Sumerians, as also seen on the Standard of Ur. Louvre Museum.

The circumstances under which Sargon came into conflict with Lugal-zage-si also remain somewhat mysterious, due to a lack of sources. According to datable sources from his reign, three battles were necessary to defeat Lugal-zage-si and his allies, and finally take Uruk. The city's walls were razed, and the defeated king was taken prisoner and brought to Nippur, to the sanctuary of the god Enlil, who granted sovereignty and thus ruled in favor of Sargon. The date of this conquest is also debated, in connection with questions about the length of Sargon's reign. It occurred around 2300 BC. Sallaberger and Schrakamp more precisely propose the year 2292 BC.

Sargon, king of Agade, bailiff of the goddess Aštar, king of the world (or "of Kish"), anointed priest of the god Anum, lord of the land, governor for the god Enlil, was victorious over Uruk in battle, conquered fifty governors with the mace of the god Ilaba, as well as the city (of Uruk), [and] destroyed its (Uruk's)] w[alls]. Further, he captured Lugal-zage-si, king of Uruk, in battle (and) led him off to the gate of the god Enlil in a neck stock.

Sargon's triumph over Lugal-zage-si was an event of considerable importance, as it allowed him to dominate Sumer and the entirety of the "Land" (Sumerian kalam), over which Enlil's authority extended. Sargon's inscriptions mention other major cities conquered during this campaign or in subsequent campaigns: Ur, Eninmar, Lagash, Umma. Through his conquests, Sargon reached the "Lower Sea," i.e. the Persian Gulf, in whose waters he was able to wash his weapons, a symbolic gesture marking his victory.

=== Faraway Campaigns ===
The Akkadian Empire under Sargon and his successors.

Sargon also distinguishes himself from most of the kings who preceded him by looking beyond Lower Mesopotamia and undertaking military expeditions 'abroad.' Often highlighted in accounts written long after his death, these expeditions are poorly documented for the period of his reign: a few year names, passages from official inscriptions, some administrative texts and maybe a few unwritten monuments (if they actually date from his reign). Their chronology is uncertain: they are generally considered to have occurred after his victory against Lugal-zage-si, but some may have taken place before. Their objectives are also not well understood. Likely, the initial project was not to conquer territories permanently, these campaigns seeming to serve mainly to obtain glory and riches, to dominate trade routes, and to restrain rival external powers.

Sargon waged wars eastward into the Iranian plateau. He claimed to have defeated Elam—notably in a year name—and the more distant land of Marhashi (Parahshum). A year name also commemorates his victory over Urua (or Arawa), a city on the route between Mesopotamia and Elam. Several inscriptions detail the captured chieftains and mention the spoils taken during these campaigns. The land of Simurrum, located in the western Zagros Mountains north of the Diyala River Valley, is also one of his victims, commemorated in a year name. These lands lie on routes leading to the rich deposits of minerals and stone further east.

It is more doubtful that Sargon made conquests in the Persian Gulf, as far as the land of Magan (present-day Oman), as has been suggested based on a hypothetical interpretation of a passage from a fragmentary inscription of his grandson Naram-Sin. In two inscriptions, however, Sargon proclaims that he brought ships to Akkad from various countries bordering the Gulf or located further east: Dilmun (Bahrain), Magan, and Meluhha (the Indus Valley, where the Indus Valley Civilization, or "Harappan" civilization, flourished). The fact of having established commercial connections with these countries, which until then mainly interacted with the cities of Sumer, would already be an achievement worthy of commemoration.

Syria is another area where Sargon was active. At the beginning of his reign, three powers dominated the region: Mari (modern-day Tell Hariri) on the Middle Euphrates, Nagar (Tell Brak) in the Khabur region, and Ebla (Tell Mardikh) further west in Central Syria. In one of his inscriptions, Sargon proclaims that the great sovereign god of the Syrian region, Dagan, whose major sanctuary was located at Tuttul (Tell Bi'a), had granted him supremacy over these regions, which he referred to as the "Upper Country," in the same way that Enlil had granted him authority over Lower Mesopotamia (simply the "Country"). One of his year names commemorates his victory against Mari, a site that suffered destruction around this time, generally seen as a consequence of this conflict; but an alternative hypothesis places the destruction later, under Naram-Sin. The same uncertainty exists regarding Nagar and Ebla: the latter was destroyed around this time, but rather before Sargon's conquests, by its rival Mari; both may well have been targets of Sargon's armies, but he does not mention this in the known inscriptions. He only refers to having dominated these regions and the even more distant western lands rich in natural resources, the "Cedar Forest," that is, Lebanon and/or the Nur-Amanus Mountains, and the "Silver Mountains" in Anatolia. Here again, Sargon seems to have both disrupted the political order and gained substantial ressources.

Sargon, king of the world (or "of Kish"), was victorious (in) 34 battles. He destroyed their (city) walls as far as the shore of the sea. He moored the ships of Meluhha, Magan, and Tilmun at the quay of Agade. Sargon, the king, bowed down to the god Dagan in Tuttul. He (the god Dagan) gave to him (Sargon) the Upper Land: Man, larmuti, and Ebla as far as the Cedar Forest and the Silver Mountains."

Although Sargon claimed to have subdued a territory stretching from the "Lower Sea" (the Persian Gulf) to the "Upper Sea" (the Mediterranean), it is therefore unlikely that his military victories at this stage resulted in lasting conquests. That would be the task of his successors.

== Government ==
=== Inscriptions and titles ===
Sargon's commemorative inscriptions demonstrate changes compared to previous periods. While earlier official inscriptions were written in Sumerian, the king's scribes began to also write inscriptions in Akkadian, including bilingual Akkadian-Sumerian inscriptions. The themes addressed also relegated acts of piety toward the gods to the background, focusing instead on military conquests: "the rise of a newcomer from the north facilitated the emergence of a new ideology of kingship, changing the image of the king from that of a cultic and administrative official to that of a war hero."

The raw materials used for the monuments upon which these inscriptions were carved were themselves linked to these triumphs, as they consisted of stones or metals obtained through plunder. Some included images depicting these victories. They were deposited within sanctuaries, near the deities who had granted Sargon his successes, above all in the Ekur, the temple of the god Enlil located in Nippur. The impact of these inscriptions—and of the ideology they convey—on future generations is seen in the fact that they are preserved mainly in the form of copies made centuries after they were written, and that some of their passages served as inspiration in narratives of the legend of Sargon.

The inscriptions commissioned by Sargon after his victory over Lugal-zage-si show that he adorned himself with several titles affirming his hegemonic ambitions: "King of the Land" (lugal-kalam-ma) and "Great Steward (ensi_{2}-gal) of the god Enlil", also "King of Kish" (lugal Kiš), which can be understood, according to the meaning given to the ideogram KIŠ, as "King of (the city of) Kish" or "King of the Totality"/"King of the World/Universe" (šar kiššatim in Akkadian). Other titles have a more pronounced religious aspect: "priest/anointed (pa_{4}-šeš/pašišum) of the god An," which is a reference to the city of Uruk, and "Baillif (maškim) of the goddess Ishtar/Inanna," which refers to the city of Akkad. It is the first step towards the constitution of the ideology of Akkadian kingship which his successors would refine.

=== Army and War ===
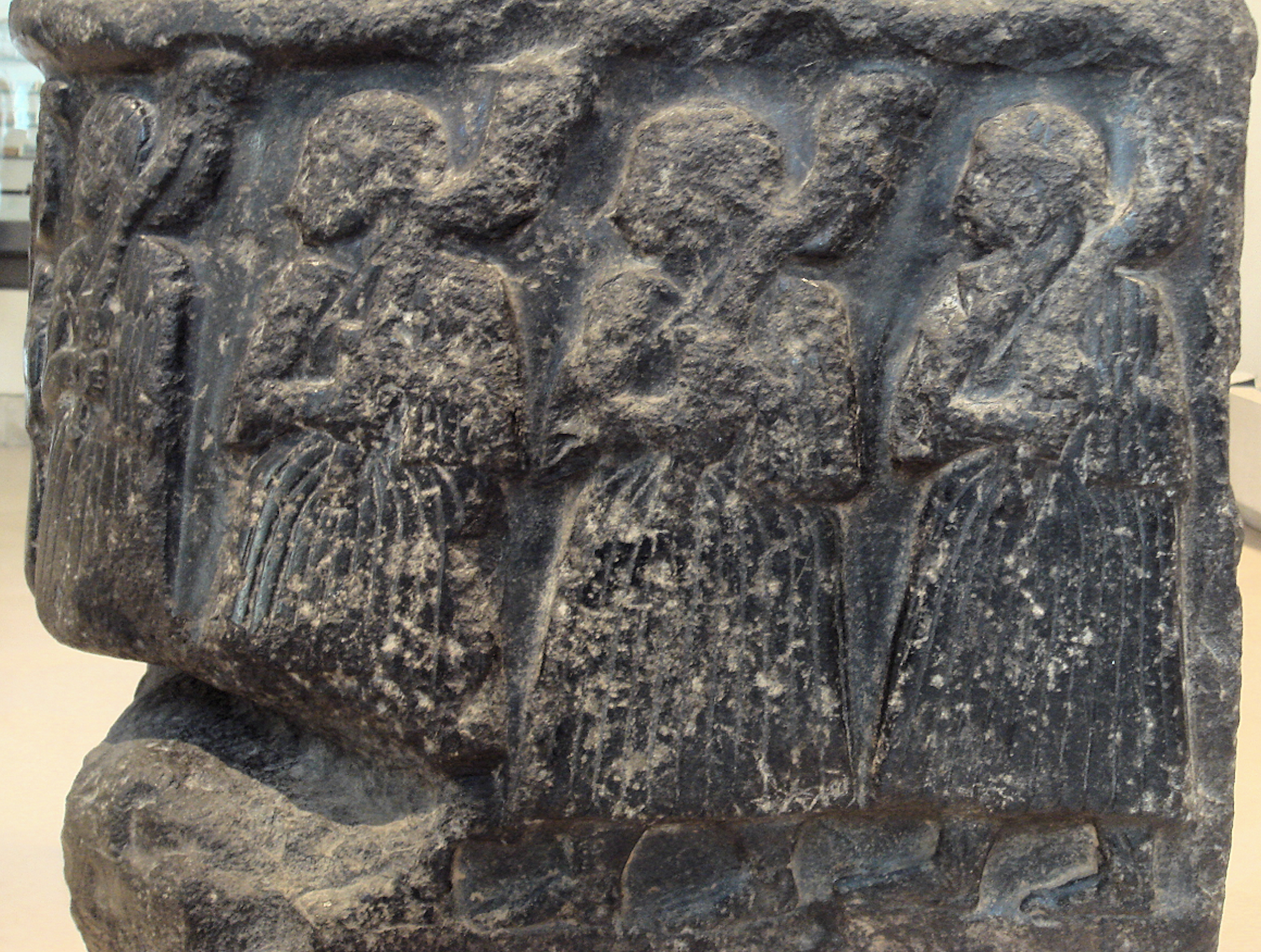
Fragmentary stele of Sargon, depicting the monarch leading his troops, found at Susa (see above): Akkadian soldiers, armed with maces. Louvre Museum.

Sargon's reign thus marked the beginning of a significant shift in the ideology of kingship, which took on a more military and heroic character. Obviously, his army formed the basis of his power and the key to his successes: his kingdom rested on military might.

One of the long inscriptions celebrating his triumph over Lugal-zage-si mentions the "nine regiments of Akkad," a division into nine corps also found in a text from the time of his grandson Naram-Sin. One of his inscriptions also mentions that he fed at his table daily 5,400 men, who are generally understood to be soldiers, personally bound to the king, forming a truly professional army. But most of the information about the Akkadian army (command structure, corps, weaponry) dates from the time of Sargon's successors.

Sargon undertook several military campaigns during his reign, including far-flung expeditions, and the only known year names for his reign all celebrate military victories, echoing his royal inscriptions. These inscriptions recount his successes, summarized as the "34 battles" in which he was victorious. Later copies of several of these inscriptions end with a list of defeated rulers, presumably captions illustrating the depictions of these same individuals on the original stelae.

The stelae known from the reign of Sargon and the beginnings of the empire, though fragmentary, also have a military theme. A stele unearthed at Susa, bearing a fragmentary inscription in Sargon's name, depicts the king followed by a servant holding a parasol, then soldiers. Another from the same site, whose fragmentary inscription does not allow for the identification of the king, could be attributed to Sargon; an Akkadian king holds a net containing captured enemies (including Lugal-zage-si?), following a motif borrowed from the art of the Early Dynastic period (Stele of the Vultures).

=== Administration ===
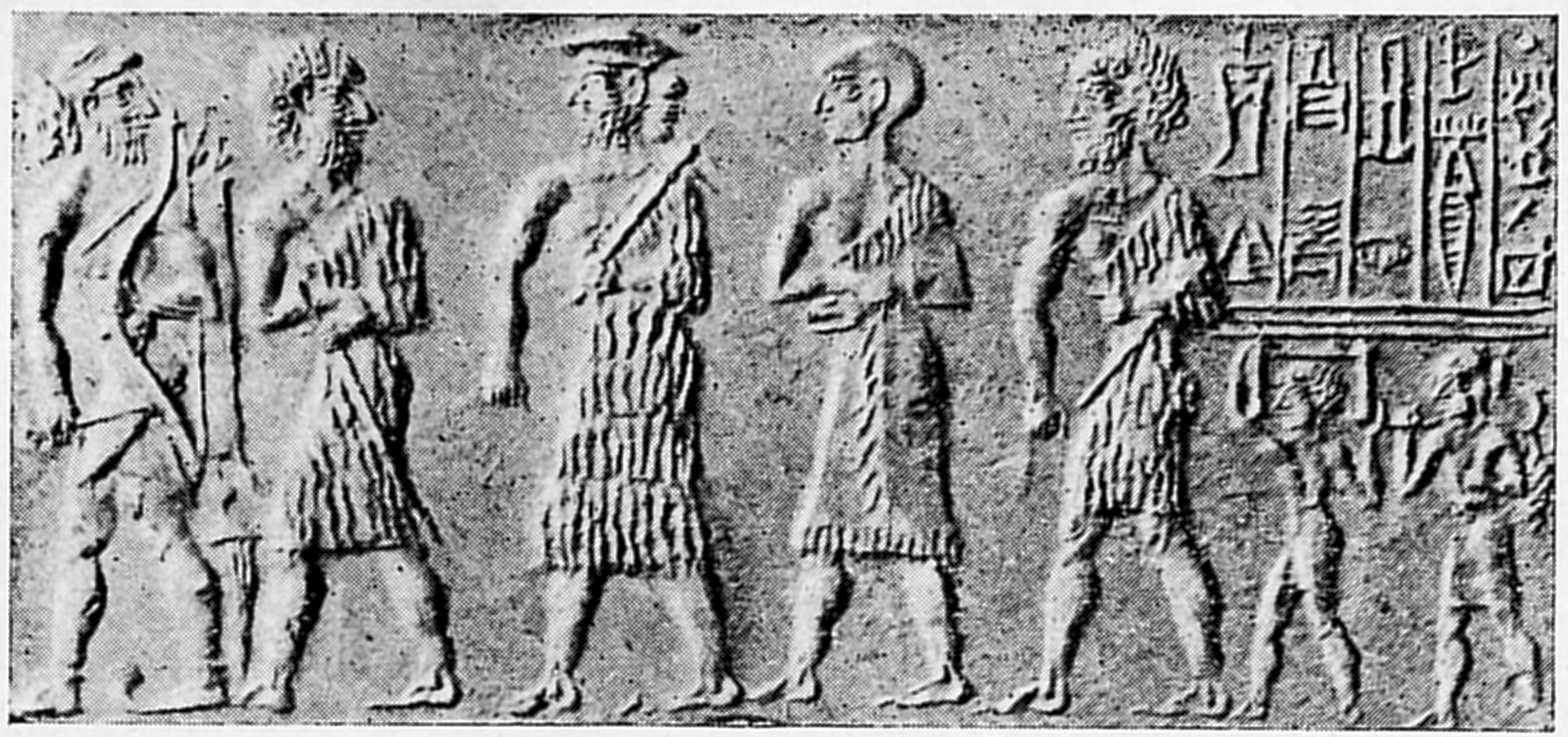
Cylinder seal of the scribe Kalki, showing Prince Ubil-Eshtar, probable brother of Sargon, with dignitaries (an archer in front, two dignitaries, and the scribe holding a tablet following the Prince). Inscription: "Ūbil-Aštar, brother of the king: KAL-KI the scribe, (is) his servant."

The organization of the kingdom during Sargon's reign is first approached through a few commemorative inscriptions. He maintained Akkad as the capital. The former kingdoms became provinces entrusted to governors (who bore the title of ensi_{2}, previously used to refer to the rulers of Lagash). Two inscriptions mention that Sargon appointed "sons of Akkad" as governors. The meaning of this expression is debated. It could indicate that he placed people from Akkad, close to him and in whom he had complete confidence, at the head of his conquests. This attempt would not have been successful, at least in the Sumerian states, which were generally governed by administrators with strong local ties. This approach therefore emphasizes an opposition between 'Akkadian' and 'Sumerian' elements, and the fact that the domination of the former would provoke repulsion among the latter. An alternative interpretation, based primarily on later sources (especially the Manishtushu Obelisk), considers that the expression "sons of Akkad" simply designates people loyal to the king and selected by him (through the granting of major offices and estates), without distinction of origin. In fact, nothing clearly indicates discrimination against the 'Sumerians', even though Akkadian influence became more noticeable in the south. Among the governors known from the time of Sargon, that of Abad, Meskigala, bears a Sumerian name and was already in office before Sargon's conquest. Of the attested governors of 'Sumerian' cities, only two, in office at Umma, have an Akkadian-sounding name.

At a lower level, the administrative tablets of the 'Sumerian' cities of Adab, Umma, and Nippur also indicate continuities: administrators and scribes bear Sumerian names, remain in their posts after the conquest, and continue previous administrative practices. The main change is the requirement to report to Akkad, where the governor of Adab is seen traveling several times, while simultaneously receiving visits from Sargon in his province. The appearance of Akkadian units of measurement in administrative texts is also noteworthy. Akkadian influence is primarily exerted through military personnel, who act as intermediaries for royal power. The governor of Adab may also have personally participated in the campaign toward the Cedar Forest.

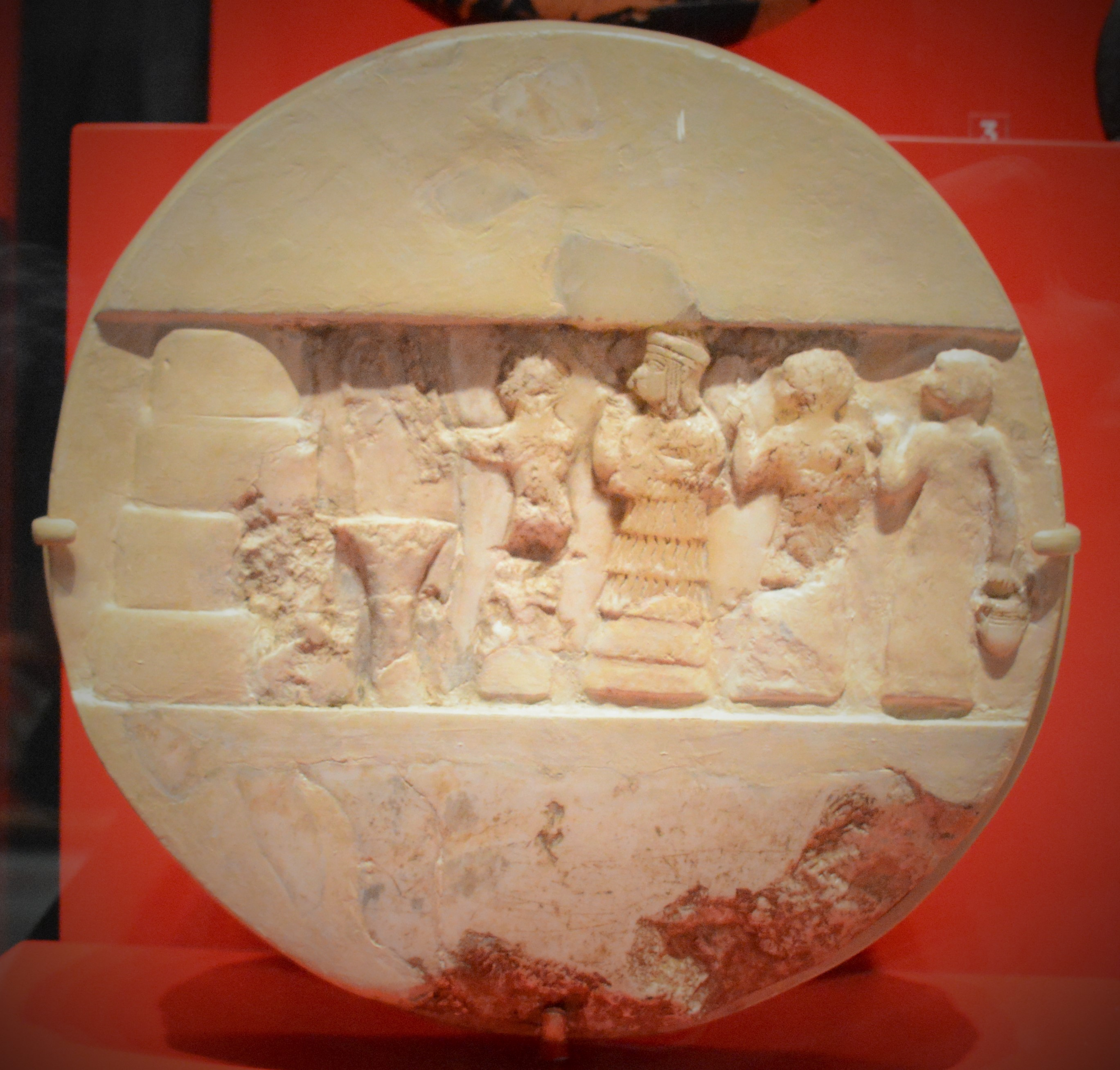
Disc depicting a ritual scene with Enheduanna represented in the center (restored). Penn Museum.

The relationship between Sargon and the southern lands he conquered is also illustrated by the case of his daughter, Enheduanna, appointed high priestess of the moon god Nanna (Sin in Akkadian) at Ur, one of the major sanctuaries of Sumer. It is also possible that another of his daughters was installed as high priestess of the god Enlil at Nippur. It is not known for certain whether Sargon was the first to do this (this practice is not attested before), but in any case, his successors continued it. Thus, members of the royal family were placed in key positions within the administration of the great temples, where major functions were usually held by the local elite. Enheduanna occupies a special place, as later tradition attributes to her the composition of several religious hymns, the authenticity of which is debated. They seem to contain the characteristic features of the religious ideology of the era: proclamation of the unity and indivisibility of the conquered countries, celebration of the goddess Inanna, the protective goddess of the Akkadian dynasty.

Finally, as summarized by I. Schrakamp: "Sargon's rule in the south was characterized by an integration of the former city states into the realm as provinces, the installation of members of the royal family and the royal court in key positions, and the presence of Sargonic military and representatives in these provinces, while local administrative practices continued, indicating that the lower ranks of the regional administration remained in place despite the regime change."

The situation of the northern part of Lower Mesopotamia (which would later be called "Land of Akkad"), and in particular that of the capital Akkad, eludes us due to a lack of sources.

As for the regions beyond Lower Mesopotamia that were conquered by Sargon, there is no clear indication that a significant Akkadian presence was maintained there at that time, unlike what occurred under his successors. Rather, he seems to have sought to extend his influence, take advantage of long-distance trade routes, and possibly establish 'friendly' regimes in some areas.

== Historical significance ==
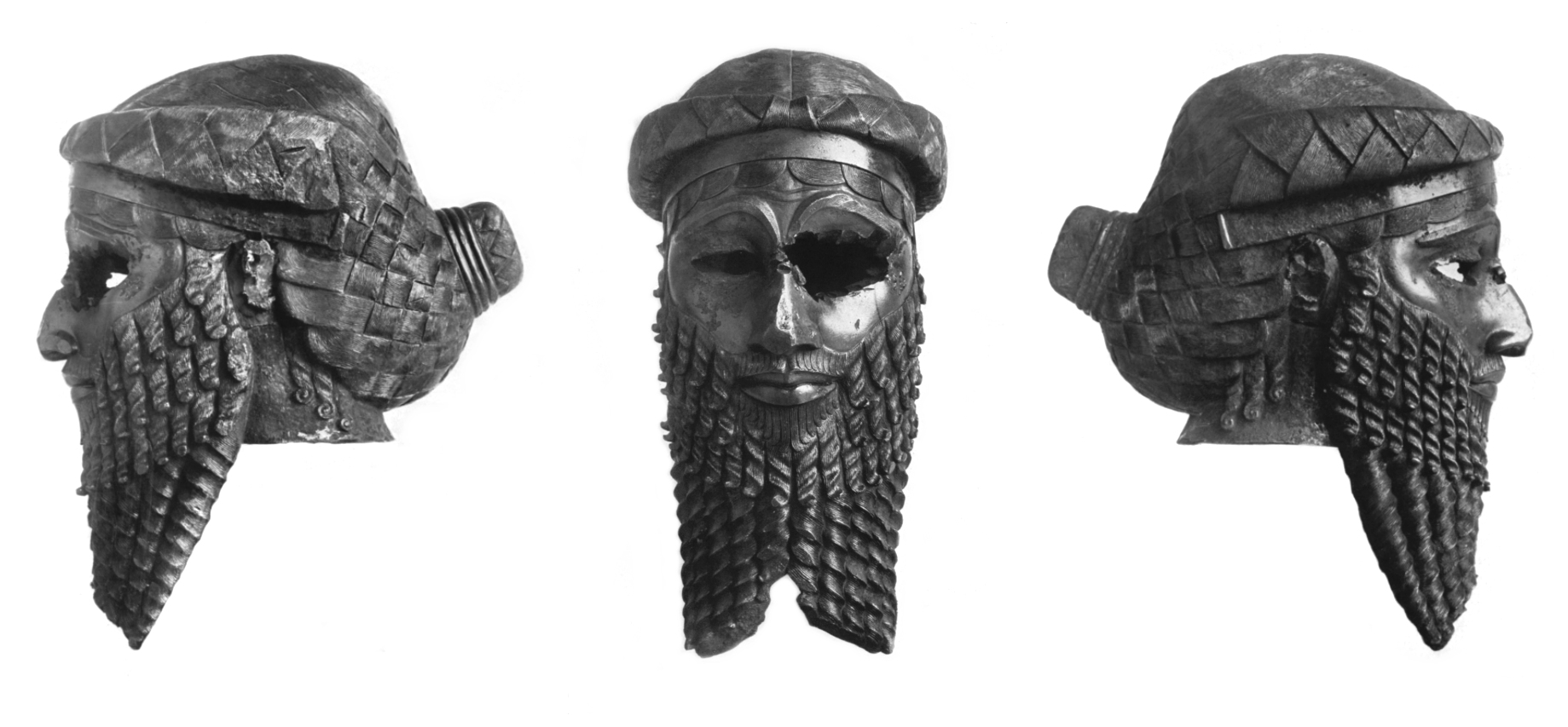
The so-called "Mask of Sargon", after restoration, in 1936. Copper alloy head of a king of Akkad, found in the temple of Ishtar in Nineveh. The braided hair and royal bun, reminiscent of the headgears of Meskalamdug, Eannatum or Ishqi-Mari, are particularly visible. On stylistic grounds, this is now thought to represent Sargon's grandson Naram-Sin, rather than Sargon himself. National Museum of Iraq.

After Sargon's death (which occurred around 2284, 2279, or 2277 BC, according to various propositions), his two sons, Rimush and Manishtushu, succeeded him to the throne of Akkad, though the order in which they succeeded him is unknown. Sargon's political edifice outlived him. They preserved and consolidated their father's legacy through further victorious military campaigns abroad, and, under Rimush, by suppressing revolts that had engulfed cities in the southern part of the empire. After them, Sargon's lineage continued to hold power with Naram-Sin, and later with Shar-kali-sharri. The end of the latter's reign, to be placed in the first half of the 22nd century BC, saw the decline of the Akkadian Empire. The Akkadian kings who succeeded him, whose reigns were marked by the definitive collapse of the kingdom, were apparently not part of Sargon's dynasty.

The impact of Sargon's reign, which has gone down in history as one of the greatest Mesopotamian kings, has been the subject of much discussion. The recognition of the accomplishments of Enshakushana and Lugal-zage-si has somewhat tempered the 'revolutionary' aspect long attributed to his conquests: a significant portion of the shift towards the formation of larger kingdoms (or 'proto-empires') can be credited to these kings, who were the first to attempt to dominate the entirety of Lower Mesopotamia. The continuity between the endeavors of these three kings thus encourages us to consider them together: by building upon many elements established by his immediate predecessors, Sargon appears in many respects as the last sovereign of the Early Dynastic period. Moreover, his political enterprise was undoubtedly still in its early stages at the time of his death, and it fell to his successors, who faced several revolts in the conquered lands, to consolidate it and ensure its viability. According to P. Steinkeller, the political entity formed by Sargon was, "at best, (…) an imperial project under way." It is under his successors that we can identify the emergence of 'imperial' ideology and practices in the Akkadian realm, in particular under Naram-Sin (claim to universal domination, divinization of the king, standardization of administrative practices), whose reign may represent more of a break with the previous era than that of Sargon.

But there are many arguments that suggest Sargon's reign was a pivotal moment in Mesopotamian history, establishing a model that was repeated by many kings after him, often in reference to his actions. Regarding relations with countries outside Mesopotamia, even if he did not undertake political integration, Sargon shaped in many ways the image of the conquering king embarking on long military campaigns to subdue foreign enemies. These undertakings had both heroic and cosmological dimensions, and served to consolidate his legitimacy at the heart of his kingdom. From a territorial point of view, this king is (as far as we know) the first to manage to unify the north and south of Lower Mesopotamia, even if he is not necessarily the first to consider or undertake it. According to P. Michalowski: "Sargon, as has happened so many times in human history, opportunistically exploited a confluence of contemporary ideas from the northwest and the south while finding himself in a unique military and geopolitical situation that he ingeniously exploited to become the last man standing and the founder of a new dynasty imbued with new political ideas." His inscriptions, which proclaim his hegemonic ambitions, lay the foundations of Akkadian royal ideology, and his military campaigns define the directions in which the troops of his successors would again head. According to A. Westenholz, in many respects, Sargon accomplished something new, achieving significant conquests and distant expeditions, as well as imposing a harsher rule marked by the destruction of the walls of conquered cities. He believes that Sargon was undoubtedly seen as an exceptional figure even in his own time, adored by some and probably hated by many others. Similarly, according to B. Lafont, his achievements should not be minimized, because he truly began to create something that did not exist before.

== A legendary figure ==
The fascination that Sargon exerted on his contemporaries was passed on to future generations. They portrayed him as a model warrior king and conqueror, endowing him with an aura that did not fade during the long history of Mesopotamia, since narratives in which he is the protagonist were still being composed in the 8th century BC, more than a millennium and a half after his death. He has in some ways a role among the Mesopotamians similar to that played by Alexander the Great in the Greco-Roman world.

The beginning of the 2nd millennium BC marks a crucial turning point in the development of the material concerning Sargon: it is during this period that the main narratives about him were compiled, and it is also the moment when a 'pseudo-historical' tradition based on divination was born and developed. Sargon has since been the subject of numerous legends known from texts from various periods of Mesopotamian history. They are still poorly understood, as they are attested by only a few examples, which makes it difficult to reconstruct their textual history. Texts from the beginning of the 2nd millennium BC bear witness to various legendary traditions about Sargon, which then disappear from the sources, perhaps evidence that these traditions were not taken up again.

The value of these texts for reconstructing the history of Sargon's reign has long been debated. Do they necessarily have a historical core around which later generations embellished stories drawn from their folklore and events concerning other kings? Even though it is vague and overly simplified, the legendary image of Sargon contains a grain of truth in that it tell "the rise of the 'new man' of non-royal background (aspects that were later enriched with obscure and unusual features), able to build his own fortune and position, which led him to political and military successes." These legends have often been used by historians, particularly to reconstruct Sargon's reign, which is very poorly documented by contemporary sources. Several publications, notably those by M. Liverani and P. Michalowski, have emphasized that they should instead be analyzed in light of their context of composition, and that modern historians are often overly influenced by these legendary accounts when attempting to reconstruct the history of the Akkadian Empire. In fact, most of these texts do not have anything in common with the inscriptions of the kings of Akkad: their authors probably had only a very limited knowledge of the period of the kings of Akkad, and wrote them based on commonplaces, on what they believed to be representative of this period.

=== The 'historical' omens ===
The so-called 'historical' omens are documents related to the practice of divination, particularly that of reading the entrails of lambs (hepatoscopy and extispicy). The oldest, dating from the Old Babylonian period (ca. 2000–1600 BC), are short texts on clay liver models inscribed with brief omens, for example, "Omen of Kish, referring to Sargon." Around the middle of the 2nd millennium BC, these omens were compiled in series on longer tablets, for example, "Omen of Sargon, who had no equal" or "Omen of Sargon, who marched in darkness and light came out for him ." They underwent a final phase of compilation and reorganization a few centuries later, attested by long series of tablets from the Neo-Assyrian period (ca. 900–600 BC), with more elaborate omens: "Omen of Sargon, who went to the land of Marhashi and Ishtar came out with her luminous rising" or "Omen of Sargon, against whom, under this omen, the elders of [or: in his old age] the entire land rebelled and besieged him in Agade and Sargon came out and defeated and annihilated them, he slew their numerous army. He tied their belongings upon them, he cried “It is yours, O Ishtar!”."

The historical reliability of these omens is debated. They were written long after the reign of the Akkadian kings, and they refer to them because they are major and evocative figures in Mesopotamian scholarly tradition. Some oracles at least refer to historical events that took place during the Akkadian period, and which had not been forgotten, even if they may be altered: the revolt which Sargon is said to have triumphed over according to the late oracle cited above refers rather to the general insurrection which took place during the reign of his grandson Naram-Sin.

Whatever their basis, certain motifs recur regularly in the oracular tradition. Sargon plays the role of the 'good king' who follows the divine oracles and succeeds, while Naram-Sin is the 'bad king' who disregards them and fails—a warning to the kings who would succeed them. Another recurring theme relates to his military achievements, which refers to his conquests and, more generally, his reputation as the quintessential warrior-king. Late-period oracles dwell particularly on his distant expeditions, which seems to echo the conquests of the Neo-Assyrian kings, especially those of his namesake Sargon II (722-705 BC). Sargon has also been presented since the Old Babylonian period as a figure walking from darkness to light. This motif has no known origin in the Akkadian texts, and its exact meaning is undetermined. It also appears in some literary accounts about Sargon.

=== Sargon Epos ===
A group of four Babylonian texts, summarized as "Sargon Epos" or Res Gestae Sargonis, shows Sargon as a military commander asking the advice of many subordinates before going on campaigns. The narrative of Sargon, the Conquering Hero, is set at Sargon's court, in a situation of crisis. Sargon addresses his warriors, praising the virtue of heroism, and a lecture by a courtier on the glory achieved by a champion of the army, a narrative relating a campaign of Sargon's into the far land of Uta-raspashtim, including an account of a "darkening of the Sun" and the conquest of the land of Simurrum, and a concluding oration by Sargon listing his conquests.

The narrative of King of Battle relates Sargon's campaign against the Anatolian city of Purushanda in order to protect his merchants. Versions of this narrative in both Hittite and Akkadian have been found. The Hittite version is extant in six fragments, the Akkadian version is known from several manuscripts found at Amarna, Assur, and Nineveh. The narrative is anachronistic, portraying Sargon in a 19th-century milieu. The same text mentions that Sargon crossed the Sea of the West (Mediterranean Sea) and ended up in Kuppara, which some authors have interpreted as the Akkadian word for Keftiu, an ancient locale usually associated with Crete or Cyprus.

Famine and war threatened Sargon's empire during the latter years of his reign. The Chronicle of Early Kings reports that revolts broke out throughout the area under the last years of his overlordship:

Afterward in his [Sargon's] old age all the lands revolted against him, and they besieged him in Akkad; and Sargon went onward to battle and defeated them; he accomplished their overthrow, and their widespreading host he destroyed. Afterward he attacked the land of Subartu in his might, and they submitted to his arms, and Sargon settled that revolt, and defeated them; he accomplished their overthrow, and their widespreading host he destroyed, and he brought their possessions into Akkad. The soil from the trenches of Babylon he removed, and the boundaries of Akkad he made like those of Babylon. But because of the evil which he had committed, the great lord Marduk was angry, and he destroyed his people by famine. From the rising of the sun unto the setting of the sun they opposed him and gave him no rest.

A. Leo Oppenheim translates the last sentence as "From the East to the West he [i.e. Marduk] alienated (them) from him and inflicted upon (him as punishment) that he could not rest (in his grave)."

=== Chronicle of Early Kings ===
Shortly after securing Sumer, Sargon embarked on a series of campaigns to subjugate the entire Fertile Crescent. According to the Chronicle of Early Kings, a later Babylonian historiographical text:

[Sargon] had neither rival nor equal. His splendor, over the lands it diffused. He crossed the sea in the east. In the eleventh year he conquered the western land to its farthest point. He brought it under one authority. He set up his statues there and ferried the west's booty across on barges. He stationed his court officials at intervals of five double hours and ruled in unity the tribes of the lands. He marched to Kazallu and turned Kazallu into a ruin heap, so that there was not even a perch for a bird left. and

In the east, Sargon defeated four leaders of Elam, led by the king of Awan. Their cities were sacked; the governors, viceroys, and kings of Susa, Waraḫše, and neighboring districts became vassals of Akkad.

=== Origin legends ===
Sargon became the subject of legendary narratives describing his rise to power from humble origins and his conquest of Mesopotamia in later Assyrian and Babylonian literature. Apart from these secondary, and partly legendary, accounts, there are many inscriptions due to Sargon himself, although the majority of these are known only from much later copies. The Louvre has fragments of two Sargonic victory steles recovered from Susa (where they were presumably transported from Mesopotamia in the 12th century BC).

==== Sumerian legend ====
The Sumerian-language Sargon legend contains a legendary account of Sargon's rise to power. It is an older version of the previously known Assyrian legend, discovered in 1974 in Nippur and first edited in 1983. Subsequent scholarship questioned if the two fragments were actually a join, or were even from two different texts. The initial translation has also been questioned.

The extant versions are incomplete, but the surviving two fragments name Sargon's father as La'ibum. After a lacuna, the text skips to Ur-Zababa, king of Kish, who awakens after a dream, the contents of which are not revealed on the surviving portion of the tablet. For unknown reasons, Ur-Zababa appoints Sargon as his cup-bearer. Soon after this, Ur-Zababa invites Sargon to his chambers to discuss a dream of Sargon's, involving the favor of the goddess Inanna and the drowning of Ur-Zababa by the goddess in a river of blood. Deeply frightened, Ur-Zababa orders Sargon murdered by the hands of Beliš-tikal, the chief smith, but Inanna prevents it, demanding that Sargon stop at the gates because of his being "polluted with blood". When Sargon returns to Ur-Zababa, the king becomes frightened again and decides to send Sargon to king Lugal-zage-si of Uruk with a message on a clay tablet asking him to slay Sargon. The legend breaks off at this point; presumably, the missing sections described how Sargon becomes king.

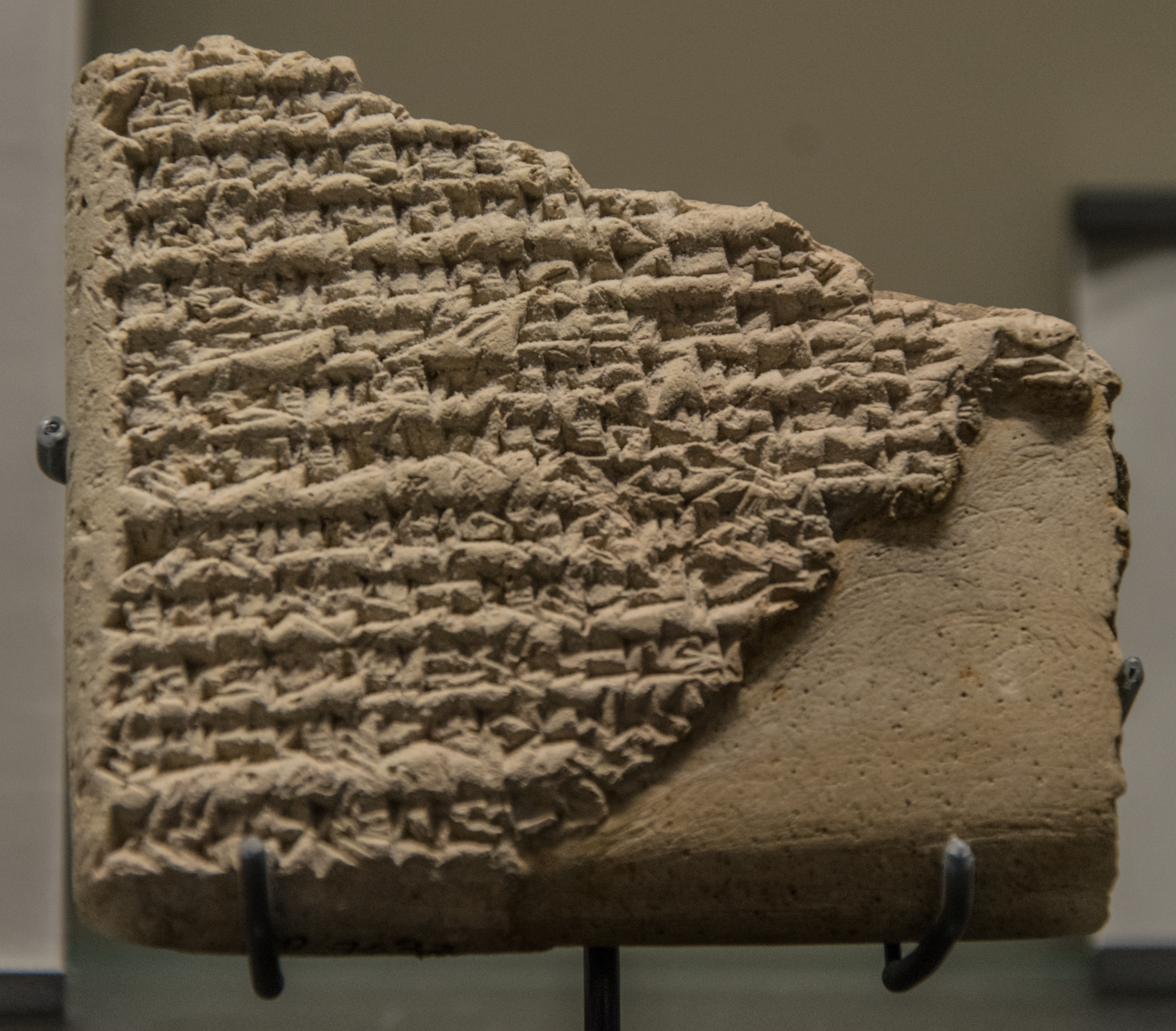
Story of the birth of Sargon, early 2nd millennium BC

The part of the interpretation of the king's dream has parallels to the biblical story of Joseph, the part about the letter with the carrier's death sentence has similarities to the Greek story of Bellerophon and the biblical story of Uriah.

==== Birth legend ====
A Neo-Assyrian text from the 7th century BC purporting to be Sargon's autobiography asserts that the great king was the illegitimate son of a priestess. Only the beginning of the text (the first two columns) is known, from the fragments of three manuscripts. The first fragments were discovered as early as 1850. Sargon's birth and his early childhood are described thus:

My mother was a high priestess, my father I knew not. The brothers of my father loved the hills. My city is Azupiranu, which is situated on the banks of the Euphrates. My high priestess mother conceived me, in secret she bore me. She set me in a basket of rushes, with bitumen she sealed my lid. She cast me into the river which rose over me. The river bore me up and carried me to Akki, the drawer of water. Akki, the drawer of water, took me as his son and reared me. Akki, the drawer of water, appointed me as his gardener. While I was a gardener, Ishtar granted me her love, and for four and ... years I exercised kingship.

Similarities between the Sargon Birth Legend and other infant birth exposures in ancient literature, including Moses, Karna, and Oedipus, were noted by psychoanalyst Otto Rank in his 1909 book The Myth of the Birth of the Hero. The legend was also studied in detail by Brian Lewis, and compared with many different examples of the infant birth exposure motif found in Eurasian folktales. He discusses a possible archetype form, giving particular attention to the Sargon legend and the account of the birth of Moses. Joseph Campbell has also made such comparisons.

Sargon is also one of the many suggestions for the identity or inspiration for the biblical Nimrod. Ewing William (1910) suggested Sargon based on his unification of the Babylonians and the Neo-Assyrian birth legend. Yigal Levin (2002) suggested that Nimrod was a recollection of Sargon and his grandson Naram-Sin, with the name "Nimrod" derived from the latter.

=== A model king ===
Sargon was regarded as a model by Mesopotamian kings for some two millennia after his death. The Assyrian and Babylonian kings who based their empires in Mesopotamia saw themselves as the heirs of Sargon's empire. Sargon may indeed have introduced the notion of "empire" as understood in the later Assyrian period; the Neo-Assyrian Sargon Text, written in the first person, has Sargon challenging later rulers to "govern the black-headed people" (i.e. the indigenous population of Mesopotamia) as he did. An important source for "Sargonic heroes" in oral tradition in the later Bronze Age is a Middle Hittite (15th century BC) record of a Hurro-Hittite song, which calls upon Sargon and his immediate successors as "deified kings" (^{d}šarrena).

Neo-Babylonian king Nabonidus showed great interest in the history of the Sargonid dynasty and even conducted excavations of Sargon's palaces and those of his successors.

== In popular culture ==
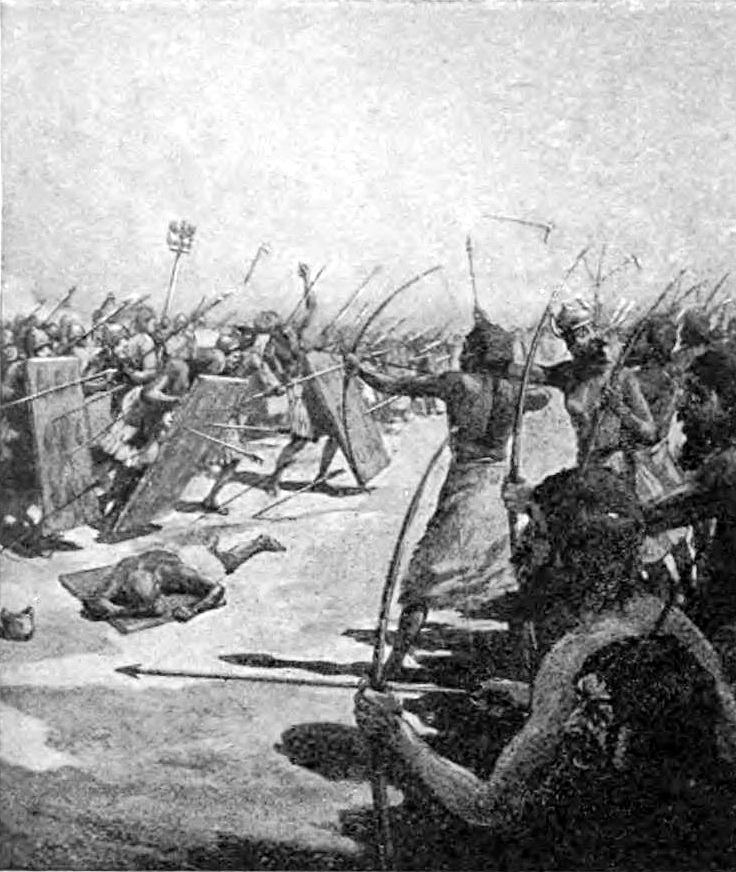
20th century depiction of a battle between the 'Sumerians' (left) and the 'Semites' led by Sargon, armed with bows and arrows.

The fanciful adventure film The Scorpion King: Rise of a Warrior (2008) imagines Sargon of Akkad as a murderous army commander wielding black magic. He is the film's main villain, portrayed by Randy Couture.

The twentieth episode of the second season of Star Trek: The Original Series, "Return to Tomorrow", features an ancient, telepathic alien named Sargon who once ruled a mighty empire.

American Rock Group They Might Be Giants refer to Sargon of Akkad in the track "The Mesopotamians" on their 2007 album The Else, along with Hammurabi, Ashurbanipal and Gilgamesh.

Carl Benjamin, British right-wing YouTuber and political commentator, goes by the online pseudonym "Sargon of Akkad" on his YouTube channel.

The Return of Rome expansion pack for the video game Age of Empires II: Definitive Edition features a campaign called "Sargon of Akkad", which depicts his conquest of Sumer and the rise of the Akkadian Empire.

== See also ==
- History of Mesopotamia
- List of kings of Akkad
- List of Mesopotamian dynasties

== Notes ==
Regnal titles
Preceded by Ur-Zababa	King of Kish ? – c. 2279 BC (middle)	Succeeded by Rimush
Preceded by Lugal-Zage-Si	King of Uruk, Lagash, and Umma c. 2334 – c. 2279 BC	Succeeded by Rimush
New title	King of Akkad c. 2334 – c. 2279 BC	Succeeded by Rimush
Preceded by Luh-ishan of Awan	Overlord of Elam c. 2334 – c. 2279 BC	Succeeded by Rimush
