= Anna Gilbert (musician) =

American singer-songwriter

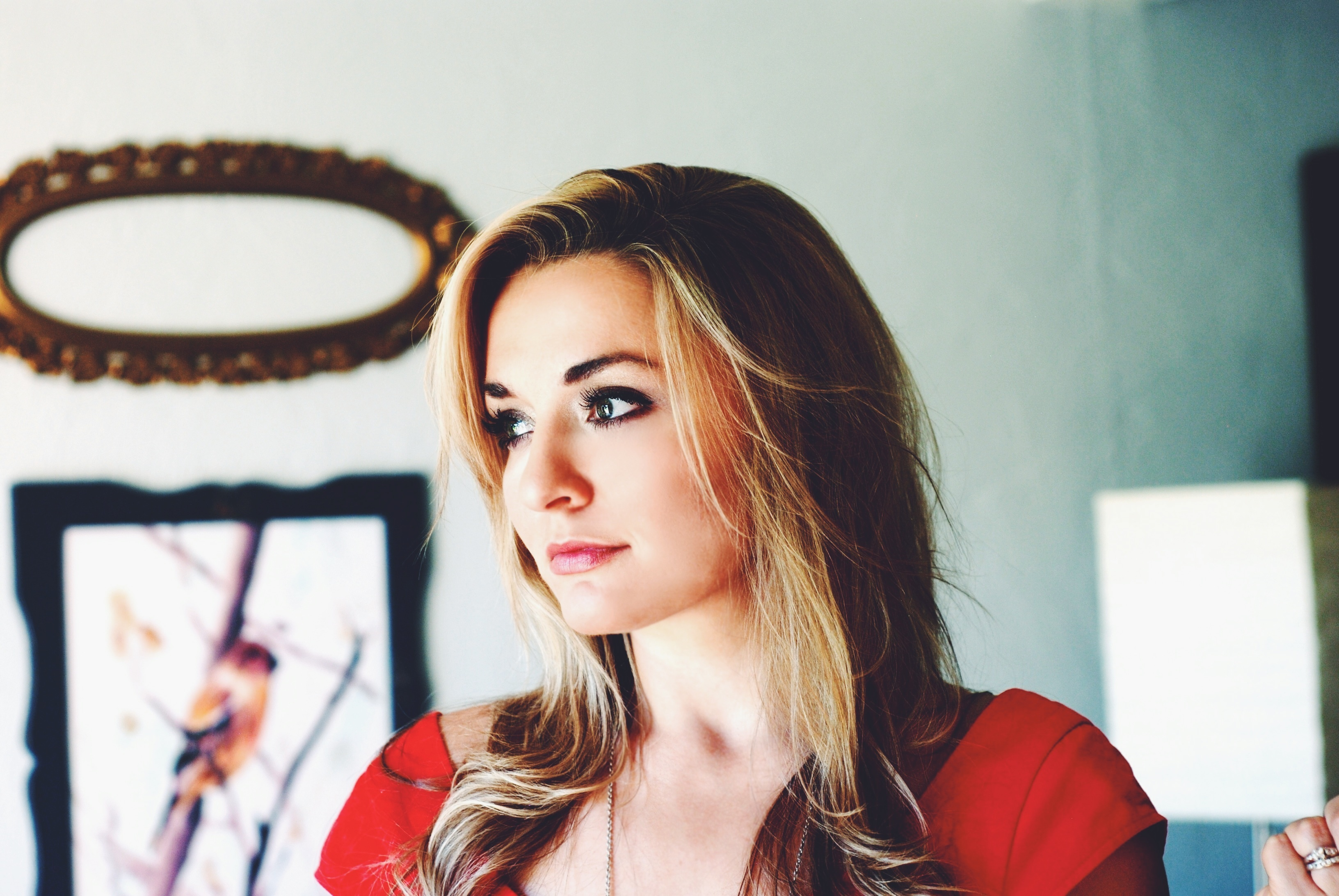
- Gilbert in 2013

Background information
- Born: Anna Elizabeth Gilbert; Eugene, Oregon
- Origin: Nashville, Tennessee
- Genres: Pop, rock, folk
- Occupation: Singer-songwriter
- Instruments: Piano and guitar
- Years active: 2003–present
- Label: Independent
- Website: Anna Gilbert Music

Anna Elizabeth Gilbert is an American singer-songwriter born in Eugene, Oregon, USA. She was the 2007 and 2009 winner of the "Inspirational Artist of the Year" award for the National Momentum Awards on Indieheaven.com in Nashville, Tennessee. She self-produced her first two albums with music and lyrics that she wrote herself. Her third album was produced with Charlie Peacock in Nashville at The Art House and is licensed by BMI. Her fourth musical project was an EP titled Like a River, produced by Sam Ashworth was also made at The Art House. In 2010, Gilbert became Eugene Weekly's "Next Big Thing" – a contest which includes votes by the public and a panel of judges. In December 2010, she also released a Christmas album which she produced with bandmate Wilson Parks. It was an editor's pick on CDbaby.com.

== Musical career ==
Gilbert's parents were both musical – her father, Andrew "Andy" Gilbert was a high school music teacher and is currently a youth pastor at Eugene Faith Center, and her mother, Kathleen "Kathy" Gilbert, is also a minister and a musician. Both parents spent time playing in bands and singing in ensembles while Anna was growing up. Anna has an older brother, also a musician, named Mikah Sykes and a younger sister named Rachel.

Gilbert began playing the piano and writing at a young age and won a citywide songwriting competition in the fifth grade. She wrote and produced her first album, God Sees, at the age of 19. She toured the West Coast of America playing mostly in churches and at college venues.

Gilbert recorded her second album, Falling in a Beautiful Place, completely self-composed and self-produced in 2007. She performed at a benefit to help fund relief efforts in Mozambique in June 2007 with Calling Simon, an acoustic band from Eugene, and Feel Good Remedy.

She met Charlie Peacock in Seattle, Washington, and worked with him to record a third album Your Love My Medicine that was released in spring 2009. Her summer tour for 2009 includes venues in Hawaii, Idaho, Washington, California, Oregon and Montana.

Gilbert opened for Brandon Heath at God & Country in Nampa, Idaho, on July 4, 2009. She played with Tommy Walker in May 2009 at University of Hawaii's Stan Sheriff Center. She also opened for Bebo Norman in Eugene in 2008. In February 2011, Gilbert opened for Derek Webb at the WOW Hall in Eugene.

In June 2010, Gilbert and her band were hosted by the ONE Campaign in Washington D.C. for a concert at Ebenezers Coffeehouse. The ONE Campaign made a video about her time there for all the ONE Supporters to see. Gilbert is a major supporter and openly advocates for the ONE Campaign.

On October 29, 2010, Gilbert won the title of Eugene Weekly's "Next Big Thing", a music/arts news and culture publication that is ranked fourth in the state of Oregon. Gilbert played in a showcase at The WOW Hall in Eugene with three other local acts who were also finalists. Over 200 artists entered their music for consideration, and after an internet voting process, four finalists were chosen. A panel of judges chose the winner from the four finalists and announced it at the end of the showcase. Eugene Weekly made Gilbert its cover story in the week of November 10, 2010.

In November 2010, Gilbert released her Christmas album which she produced with her bandmate, Wilson Parks. The two of them produced the record upstairs in Gilbert's parents' bonus room using a couple of microphones and a small drum kit. The album became Cdbaby's "Editors Pick" and received great reviews by Charlie Peacock and Serena Markstrom of the Register Guard in the "Oregon Life" section.

On November 5, 2013, Anna released "The Able Heart": Producers Jeremy Larson and Sam Ashworth each had a turn in the producers seat. Tracks 9 & 10 were recorded in Nashville, TN at The Art House with Sam Ashworth (Holly Williams, The Civil Wars, Brett Dennen, The Lone Bellow). Tracks 1–8 were produced by Jeremy Larson in Springfield, MO. The album features Todd Gummerman of MuteMath, Matt Slocum of Sixpence None the Richer, Andy Leftwich of Ricky Scaggs and Kentucky Thunder, Jordan Lawhead, and Wilson Parks.

"The Able Heart" debuted in the top 100 on the singer-songwriter charts on iTunes, and reached number 27 on the release day.

== Discography ==
- Your Love My Medicine (2009)
- Like a River (2009)
- Christmas (2010)
- The Able Heart (2013)
- August Heirlooms (2014)

== Band ==
The musicians on Gilbert's third album include Scott Denté (Out of the Grey), Ken Lewis (The Civil Wars), Calvin Turner, Sam Ashworth and Andy Leftwich.
