= Virginia Elena Ortea =

Dominican writer and journalist

- Born: Virginia Elena Ortea Mella; 17 June 1866; Santo Domingo, Dominican Republic
- Died: 1 January 1903 (aged 36); Puerto Plata, Dominican Republic
- Other names: Elena Kennedy
- Occupations: journalist, writer
- Years active: 1879–1903

Virginia Elena Ortea (17 June 1866 – 1 January 1903), who wrote under the pen name Elena Kennedy, was a journalist and writer, credited as the first Dominican Republic female journalist (to have her own byline) and one of the first women novelists in the country. She was also the writer of the only known zarzuela from the Dominican Republic. There is a street and a school named in her honor in the country.

== Early life ==
Virginia Elena Ortea Mella was born on 17 June 1866 in Santo Domingo, Dominican Republic, to Emilia Mella de la Peña and Francisco Ortea Kennedy, both white Dominicans. Her father was a prominent politician, Governor of the Puerto Plata Province and a writer, who was forced into exile in 1871 to Mayagüez and again in 1878 in San Juan, Puerto Rico. Her uncle, Juan Isidro Ortea y Kennedy was Vice President of the Dominican Republic under Ignacio María González's administration. Her paternal grandfather, Lieutenant Colonel Juan Francisco Ortea, was a military officer from Asturias, Spain; while her paternal grandmother, Fanny Kennedy, known as La Madama, had lived in Puerto Rico before immigrating to the Dominican Republic. Kennedy was born to a French mother and a British father. Her maternal grandparents, of Spanish heritage, were María Caridad de la Peña and Ildefonso Mella Castillo, brother of the national hero Matías Ramón Mella. She had a brother, Francisco Ortea (1845–1899), and a sister, Luisa Matilde Ortea Mella, who married Antonio Luciano Cocco Dorville (1870–1945) from a Puerto Plata upper-class family.

Ortea began her schooling in Santo Domingo, studied with the noted Dominican teacher José Dubeau in Puerto Plata and finished her education in Mayagüez. She also studied music in Puerto Rico with José María Rodríguez Arresón, who would later write the music to her zarzuela and piano and singing with Francisco de Arredondo Miranda.

Ancestors of Virginia Elena Ortea

4. (Spain) (Asturias) Juan Francisco Ortea
2. (Dominican Republic) Francisco Carlos Ortea Kennedy (1844–1899)
10. (United Kingdom) Mr. Kennedy
5. (Dominican Republic) Fanny Kennedy
11. (France) Mme. Kennedy
1. (Dominican Republic) Virginia Elena Ortea Mella (1866–1903)
24. (Dominican Republic) Manuel Mella Sánchez
12. (Dominican Republic) Antonio Mella Álvarez (1794–1837)
25. (Dominican Republic) Juana Álvarez Pereyra
6. (Dominican Republic) Ildefonso Mella Castillo (1818–?)
26. (Dominican Republic) José Castillo
13. (Dominican Republic) Francisca Javier Castillo Álvarez (1790–1864)
27. (Dominican Republic) Úrsula Álvarez
3. (Dominican Republic) Emilia Mella de la Caridad (1846–?)
7. (Dominican Republic) María Caridad de la Peña

== Career ==
In 1879, Ortea wrote Las feministas, a zarzuela (The Feminists, A Zarzuela), the only known zarzuela by a Dominican writer. The lyric drama, with music by Rodríguez Arresón, was performed only once, at the House of Culture of Puerto Plata. Ortea first began publishing under the pseudonym Elena Kennedy, the name of her paternal grandmother, while she was living in Mayaguëz. She published the poem, Puerto Plata in 1889. After returning to the Dominican Republic, she wrote for the daily newspaper Listín Diario Puerto Plata. She also published editorials and poems for various journals, such as La casa de América, Letras y ciencias, and Revista ilustrada. In 1901, she became the first woman in the Dominican Republic to have her own byline.

Though she first wrote as a journalist, Ortea is most known as a fiction writer. Often described as creatively simple or naïve by critics of her era, underlying humor and subject matter in her works demonstrate that she understood the gender role assigned to women in her time. In her own way, she wrote social critiques, but balanced topics against each other, as in Recuerdos y sonrisas (Memores and Smiles) and La mala madrastra (The Evil Stepmother), representing good and bad. Her first published works included Los Diamantes (The Diamonds), La Rosa de la Felicidad (The Rose of Happiness), Los Bautizos (The Baptisms) and Mi hermana Carolina (My Sister Carolina), but her most mature work was Risas y lágrimas (Laughter and Tears) published in 1901. The introduction was written by noted Dominican critics like Américo Lugo, which led to her becoming the subject of many studies by Dominican literary critics and scholars.

== Death and legacy ==
Ortea died on 1 January 1903 of kidney failure in Puerto Plata. In 1978, a second edition of Risas y lágrimas was released, which is a rare occurrence in small countries with few publishing houses, indicating the appeal Ortea continued to generate. In 2011, the Virginia Elena Ortea Model Education Center, a training facility for pedagogy, was opened in Puerto Plata, where a street has also been named in her honor. In 2016, the play "Jacobito" based on Ortea's journalistic interviews published in the Listin Diario newspaper was performed in Santo Domingo and Moca highlighting the issues of gender violence that she so aptly captured in her writings. These personal interviews were the first of the genre recorded in the country and took place during Jacobito de Lara's imprisonment during 1901 for the killing of his fiancée in a jealous rage. He had previously participated in the assassination of President Ulises Heureaux.
