= Nicole Garay =

Panamanian poet

Nicol Garay
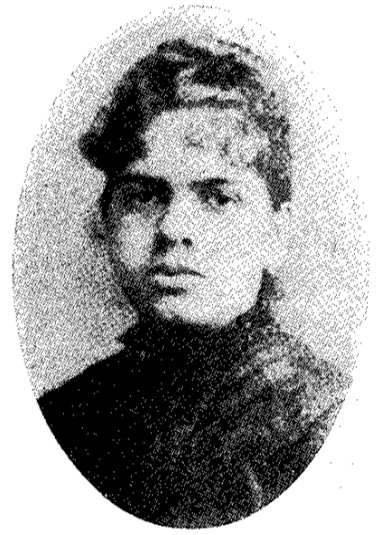
- Born: Nicolasa de las Mercedes Garay; September 10, 1873; Panama State, United States of Colombia
- Died: June 19, 1928 (aged 54); Panama
- Occupation: poet

Nicolasa "Nicol" Garay (September 10, 1873, in Colombia – June 19, 1928, in Panama) was a Panamanian poet. She was the daughter of Colombian painter Epifanio Garay Caicedo and sister of Panamanian musician and political figure Narciso Garay.

== Early life ==
Nicole was born on September 10, 1873, in Colombia (in a part of the country that would later become Panama). She was the daughter of the Panamanian painter Epifanio Garay.

== Works ==
- Cantinela
- From yesterday to today
- November 3rd
- The Patriot Boy
- Piece of Earth
- Rhyme
- Spleen
- The two prayers
