= Elizabeth Hart Thwaites =

- Born: 1772
- Died: 1833 (aged 60–61)
- Occupation: Writer

Elizabeth Hart Thwaites (1772–1833) was an Antiguan writer of biographies and Methodist histories, religious leader, and abolitionist who worked closely with her sister, Anne Hart Gilbert. The two women, working within the Methodist church became two of the first female African Caribbean writers and the first educators of slaves and free blacks in the Caribbean. In 1815, they established the Female Refugee Society, which gave instruction and moral education to enslaved women. The sisters were outspoken opponents of slavery and supporters of women's education and total emancipation, and chose in 1786 to break societal norm by becoming baptized Methodists, renouncing their life of comfort, and marrying Methodist missionaries.

== Biography ==
Elizabeth Hart was born in 1772 to Barry Conyers Hart, a wealthy black Antiguan planter and slaveholder, a year before Anne Hart's birth. (Note: There is some dispute over the birth dates of the Sisters Hart. Ferguson's 1998 book claims that Anne was born in 1768 and Elizabeth in 1771, and M'Baye agrees. Contrarily, Ferguson's earlier book in 1993, Mendez, Cueto & Rodríguez, Moore, Brooks & Wigginton, and O'Callaghan claim the dates of birth as being Elizabeth 1772, Anne 1773. This article will use the latter dates.) Elizabeth and Anne were thus born into a small but rich and powerful circle of Anglican aristocrats. Conyers Hart, himself a freed slave, was humane to his slaves, whom he did not like to punish, and helped them whenever he could with things such as manumission papers without fee. Because of his heightened social stance, Conyers Hart was able to secure a decent education for his daughters.
