= Anne Hart Gilbert =

- Born: 1768
- Died: 1834 (aged 65–66)
- Occupations: writer, teacher

Anne Hart Gilbert (1768–1834) was a Methodist writer, teacher and abolitionist. She is known as one of the Hart sisters, alongside Elizabeth Hart Thwaites.

== Selected works ==
- Memoir of John Gilbert, 1835
