= Mary D. Rosengarten =

Mary D Rosengarten
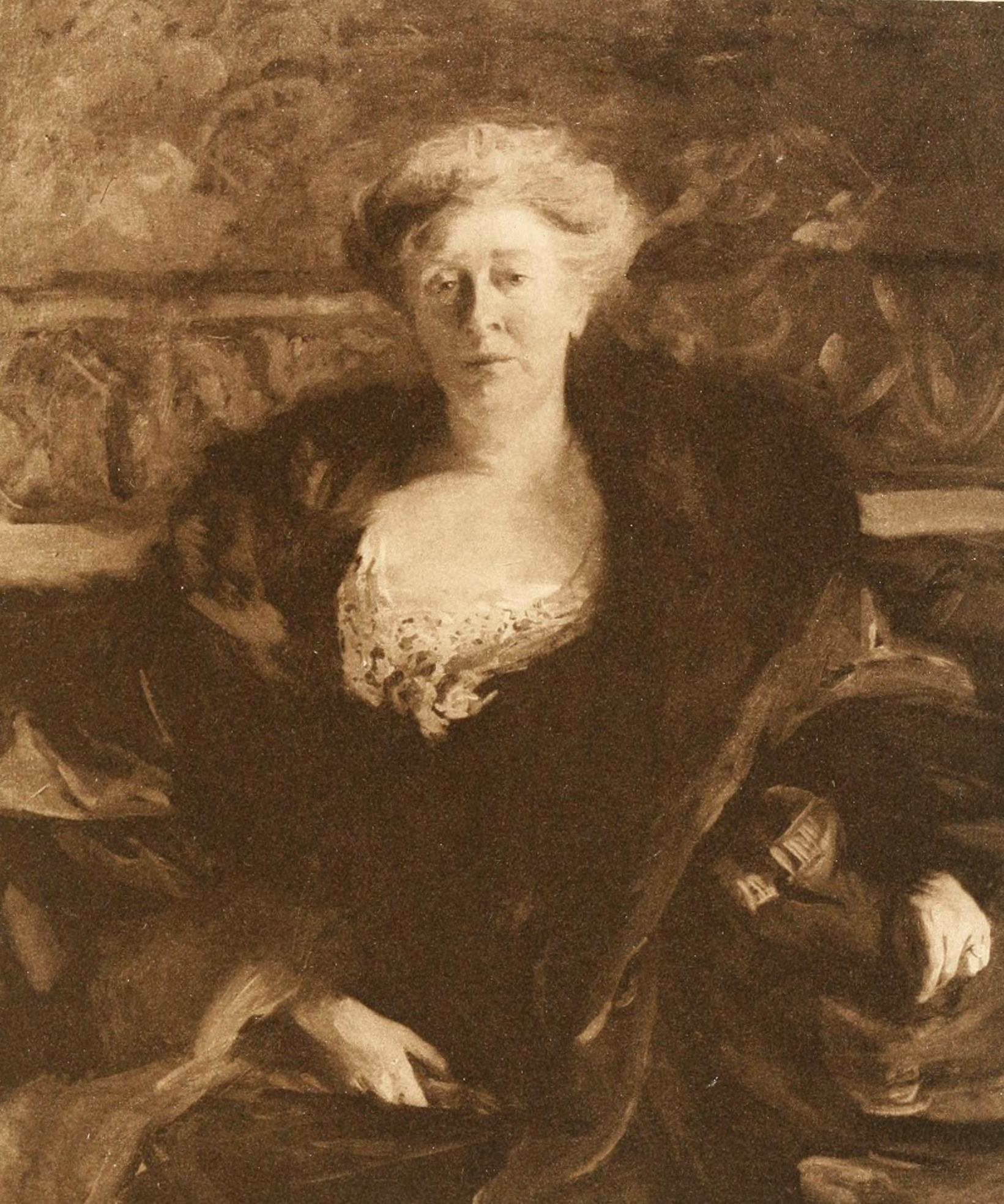
- Mary D Rosengarten by Alice Kent Stoddard
- Born: Mary D Richardson; 1846
- Died: October 29, 1913 (aged 66–67)
- Occupation: Writer

Mary D. Rosengarten (née, Richardson; 1846 – October 29, 1913) was the writer of a collection of letters known as Eight Journeys Abroad.

== Biography ==
Mary D. Richardson was born in 1846, in Pittsburgh, Pennsylvania, to James and Laura Clifford Richardson.

The family moved to St. Louis, Missouri in 1857, at which point Mary was enrolled into school and eventually graduated, head of her class, in 1862. After this she took to studying English literature under the supervision of President Sanborn of Dartmouth College, as well as entering a school in Brooklyn, N.Y in order to study vocal and instrumental music in 1863, becoming an accomplished mezzo soprano singer.

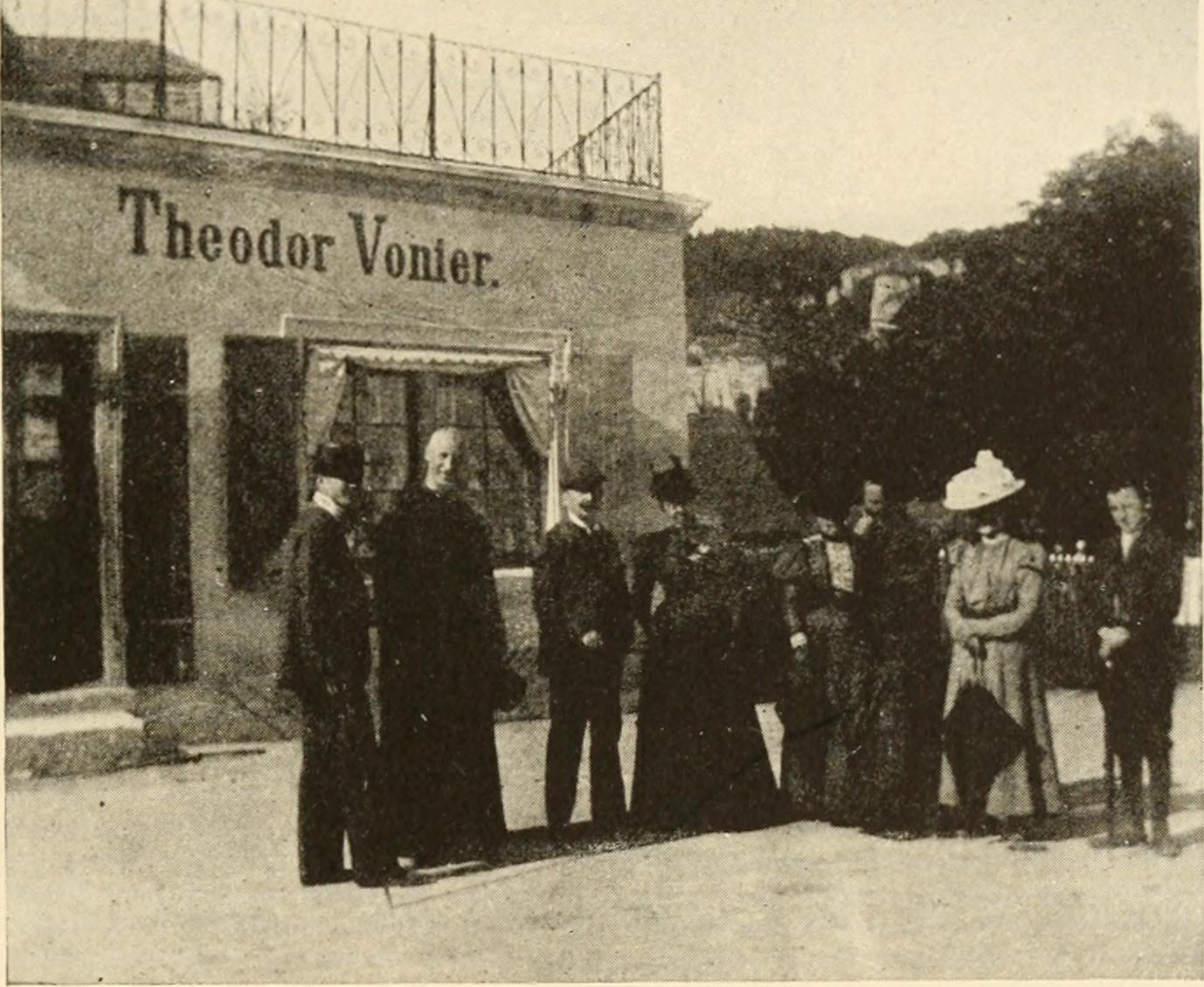
Photograph from Eight Journeys Abroad

That winter, she met her future husband, Frank Rosengarten, who, she would marry in 1873.

In October 1869, accompanied by her father, Mary Richardson made her first trip outside the United States to Milan in order to study singing. She then travelled on to visit a great part of Europe and the Middle East, including Switzerland, France, Scotland, Finland, Turkey and Egypt. She documented these extensive travels in letters and photographic illustrations which her family kept and went on to publish in 1917 as a collection known as Eight Journeys Abroad. The book was reprinted by Nabu Press in 2010 as they felt the work to be "culturally important, and despite the imperfections, have elected to bring it back into print as part of our continuing commitment to the preservation of printed works worldwide.".

She died October 29, 1913.
