= Art of Mesopotamia =

Art of Mesopotamia

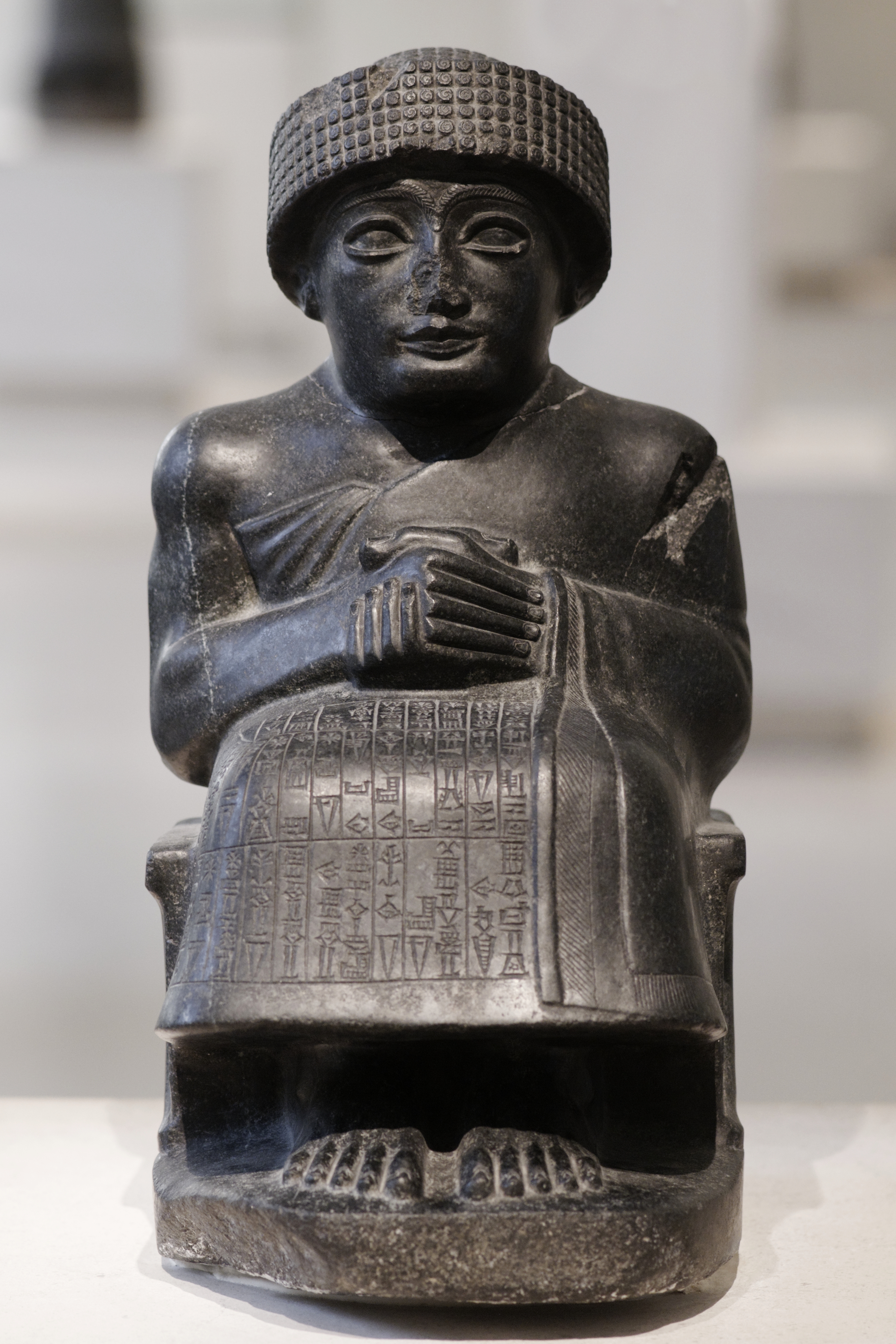
Diorite statue of Gudea, prince of Lagash, dedicated to the god Ningishzida; 2120 BC (the Neo-Sumerian period); height: 46 cm, width: 33 cm, depth: 22.5 cm
Gudea of Lagash was famous for his numerous portrait sculptures that have been recovered throughout Iraq.

The art of Mesopotamia has survived in the record from early hunter-gatherer societies (8th millennium BC) on to the Bronze Age cultures of the Sumerian, Akkadian, Babylonian and Assyrian empires. These empires were later replaced in the Iron Age by the Neo-Assyrian and Neo-Babylonian empires. Widely considered to be the cradle of civilization, Mesopotamia brought significant cultural developments, including the oldest examples of writing.

The art of Mesopotamia rivalled that of Ancient Egypt as the most grand, sophisticated and elaborate in western Eurasia from the 4th millennium BC until the Persian Achaemenid Empire conquered the region in the 6th century BC. The main emphasis was on various, very durable, forms of sculpture in stone and clay; little painting has survived, but what has suggests that, with some exceptions, painting was mainly used for geometrical and plant-based decorative schemes, though most sculptures were also painted. Cylinder seals have survived in large numbers, many with complex and detailed scenes despite their small size.

Mesopotamian art survives in a number of forms: cylinder seals, relatively small figures in the round, and reliefs of various sizes, including cheap plaques of moulded pottery for the home, some religious and some apparently not. Favourite subjects include deities, alone or with worshippers, and animals in several types of scenes: repeated in rows, single, fighting each other or a human, confronted animals by themselves or flanking a human or god in the Master of Animals motif, or a Tree of Life.

Stone stelae, votive offerings, or ones probably commemorating victories and showing feasts, are also found from temples, which unlike more official ones lack inscriptions that would explain them; the fragmentary Stele of the Vultures is an early example of the inscribed type, and the Assyrian Black Obelisk of Shalmaneser III a large and well preserved late one.

== Prehistoric Mesopotamia ==
Main Pre-Pottery Neolithic sites in the Fertile Crescent c. 7500 BC. The north and northwest of Mesopotamia were already settled by humans; the rest, with insufficient rainfall, was not.

The highland regions of Mesopotamia were occupied since the Neanderthal times, for example at the site of Shanidar Cave (65,000–35,000 years ago), but with no known artistic creation. The first artistic productions of Mesopotamia appear in the area of Upper Mesopotamia only, at the end of the Neolithic during the Pre-Pottery Neolithic A period, with simple representations of humans and animals as well as megaliths (9,500–8,000 BC). This succeeds an earlier period of development in the Levant, as in the Hayonim Cave, were carvings of animals such as horses are known from the earliest dates of the Upper Paleolithic, with dates ranging from 40,000 to 18,500 BP.

In Prehistoric and Ancient Mesopotamia, the climate was cooler than in Egypt or the Indus Valley, meaning that the valleys of the Tigris and Euphrates rivers were very different from the deserts of today; in the highlands there were bands of forest interspersed with steppes and savannas rich in flora and abounding with goats, boars, deer, and fox. After the invention of agriculture, farmers worked in the valley, but the community lived in the more easily fortifiable hills. Unlike in China and the Indus Valley civilization, the villages had two economic orientations, downhill to the fields of grain and uphill into the mountains of Anatolia with their rich mines of gold and copper. Mesopotamian cultures were thus continually in a state of flux, which had its own advantages and difficulties.

=== Art of the Pre-Pottery Neolithic period (circa 9000–7000 BC) ===
==== Pre-Pottery Neolithic A ====
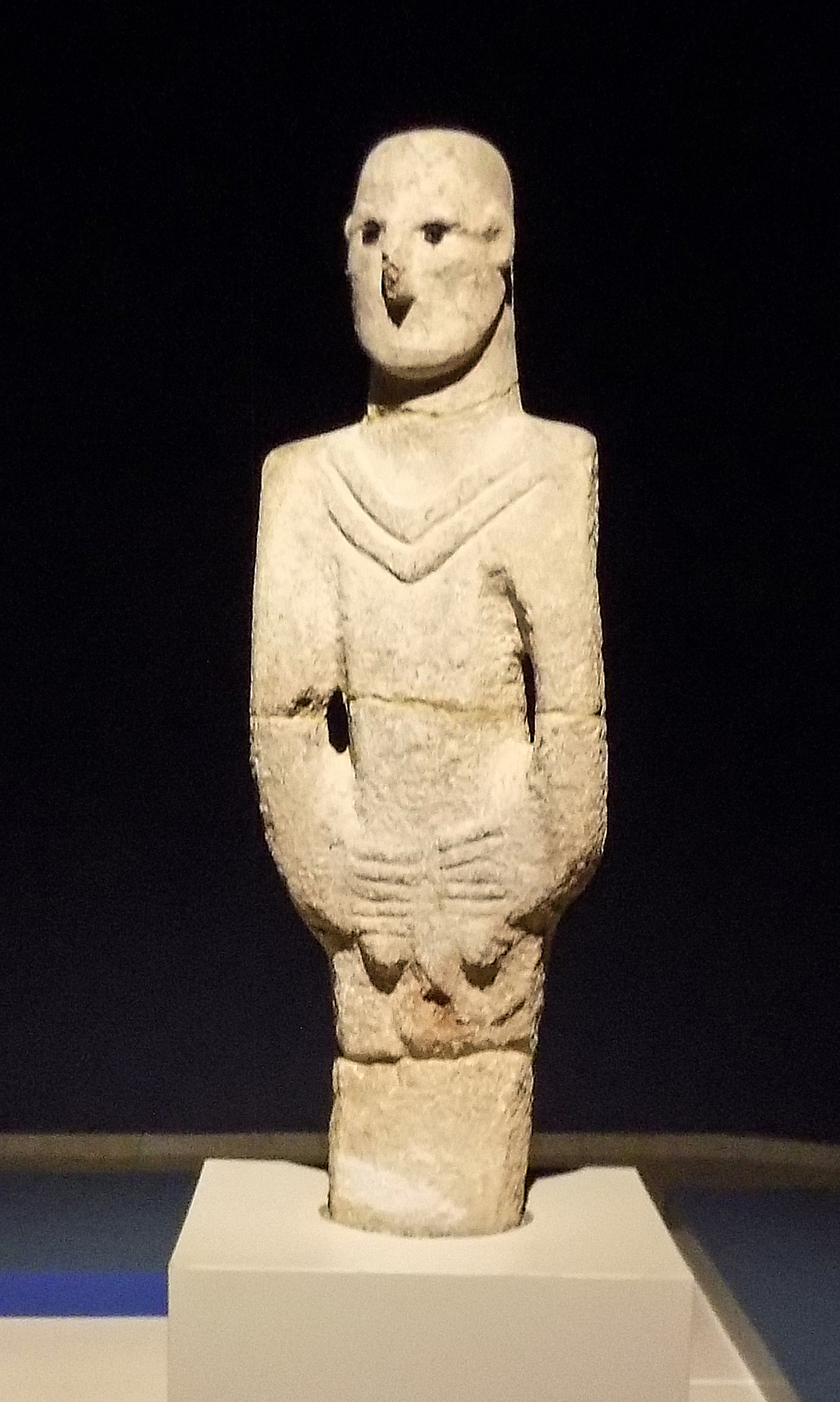
The Urfa Man, from Upper Mesopotamia circa 9000 BC, the "oldest naturalistic life-sized sculpture of a human". Şanlıurfa Museum.

Following the Epipalaeolithic period in the Near East, several Pre-Pottery Neolithic A sites are known from the areas of Upper Mesopotamia and the northern mountainous fringes of Mesopotamia, marked by the appearance around 9000 BC on the banks of the Upper Euphrates of the world's oldest known megaliths at Göbekli Tepe, and the first known use of agriculture around the same time at Tell Abu Hureyra, a site from the preceding Natufian culture.

Numerous realistic reliefs and a few sculptures of animals, as well as fragments of reliefs of humans or deities, are known from Göbekli Tepe and dated to circa 9000 BC. The Urfa Man found in another site nearby is dated to the period of the Pre-Pottery Neolithic circa 9000 BC, and is considered as "the oldest naturalistic life-sized sculpture of a human". Slightly later, early human statuettes in stone and fired clay have been found in other Upper Mesopotamia sites such as Mureybet, dated to 8500–8000 BC.

==== Pre-Pottery Neolithic B ====
Around 8000 BC, during the following period of Pre-Pottery Neolithic B, still before the invention of pottery, several early settlements became experts in crafting beautiful and highly sophisticated containers from stone, using materials such as alabaster or granite, and employing sand to shape and polish. Artisans used the veins in the material to maximum visual effect. Such object have been found in abundance on the upper Euphrates river, in what is today eastern Syria, especially at the site of Bouqras.

In northeastern Mesopotamia, the Jarmo culture (7500 BC), centered on the site of Jarmo (Qal'at Jarmo) is a prehistoric archeological site located in modern Iraq on the foothills of the Zagros Mountains. Excavations revealed that Jarmo was an agricultural community, dating back to 7500 BC, based on irrigation through natural rainfall. It preceded the human expansion towards the alluvial plains of central Mesopotamia. It was broadly contemporary with such other important Neolithic sites such as Jericho in the southern Levant, Çatalhöyük in Anatolia or Tell Sabi Abyad in northern Syria. Some fragments of stone vessels and alabaster jars have also been found in Jarmo, dating to circa 7500 BC, before the c.7000 BC invention of pottery.

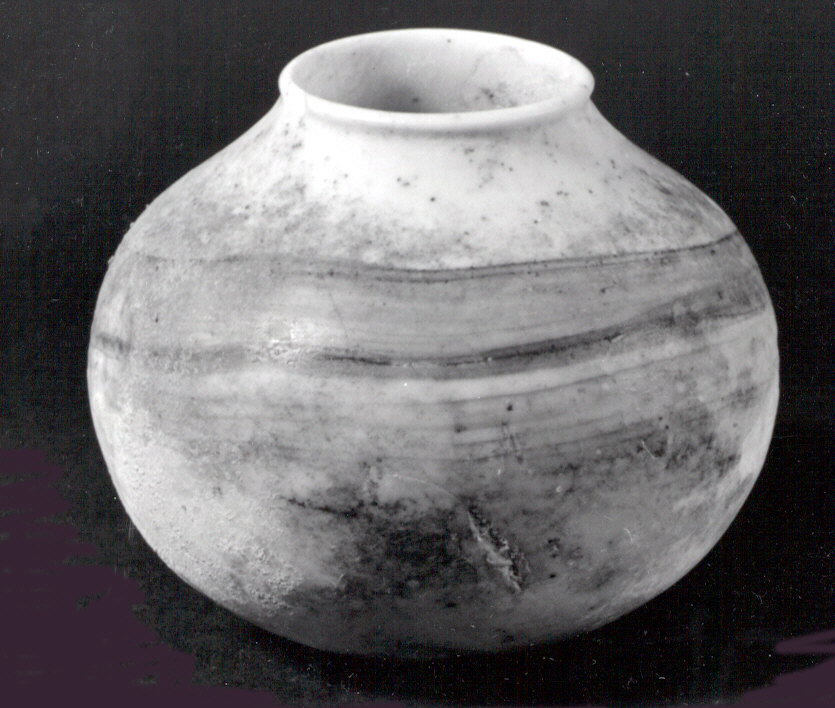
Jar in calcite alabaster, Syria, late 8th millennium BC.

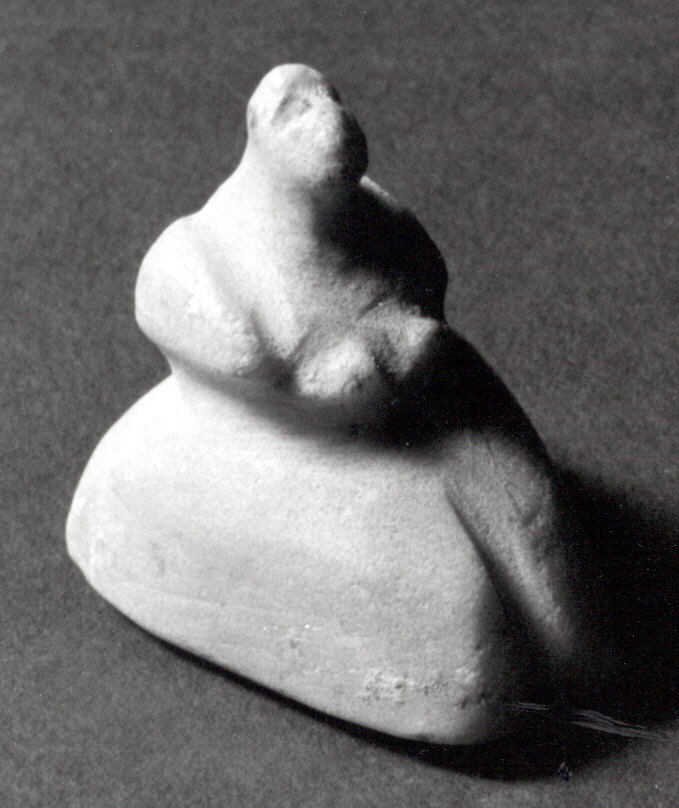
Female statuette, 8th millennium BC, Syria.

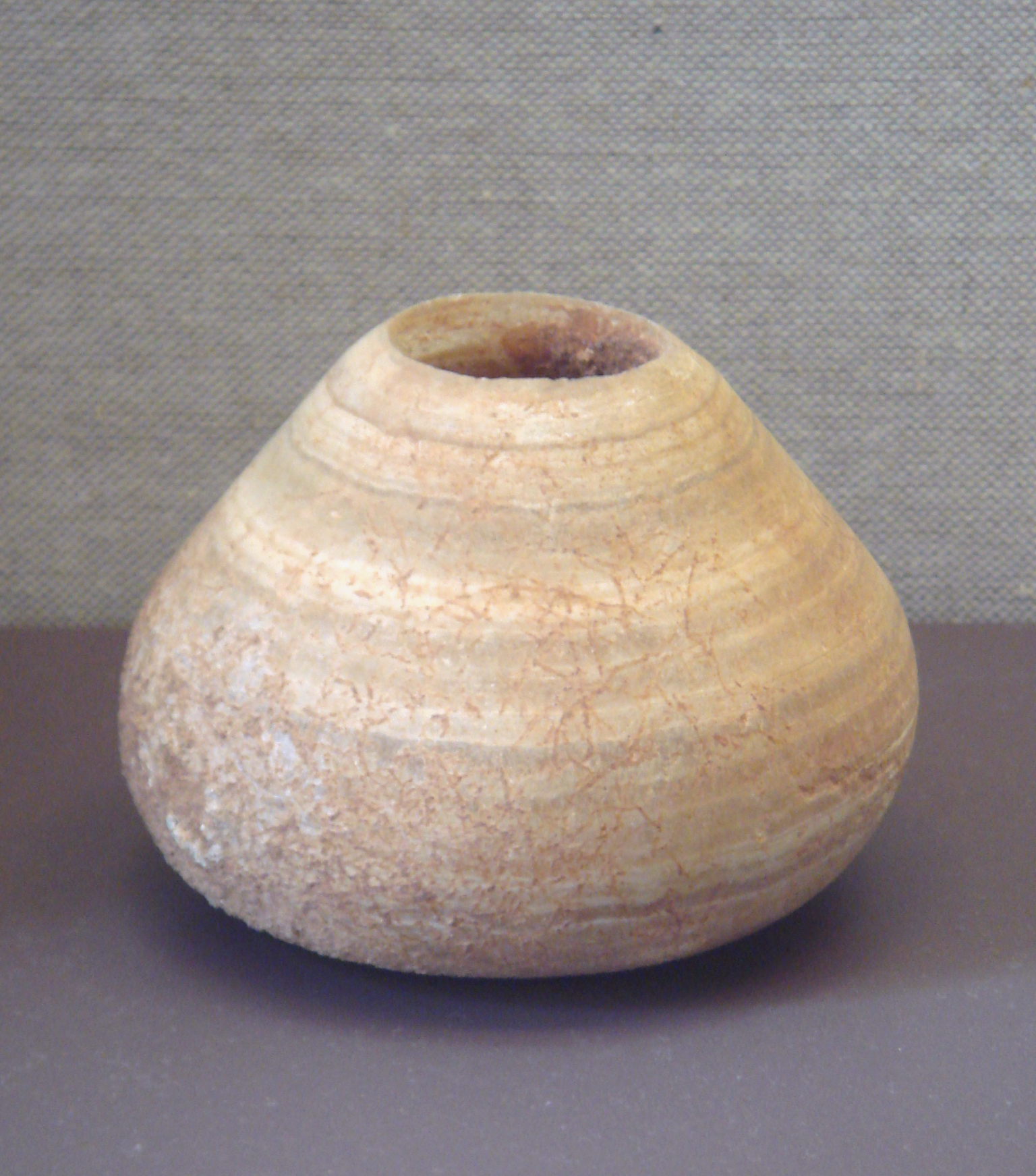
Alabaster pot Mid-Euphrates region, 6500 BC, Louvre Museum

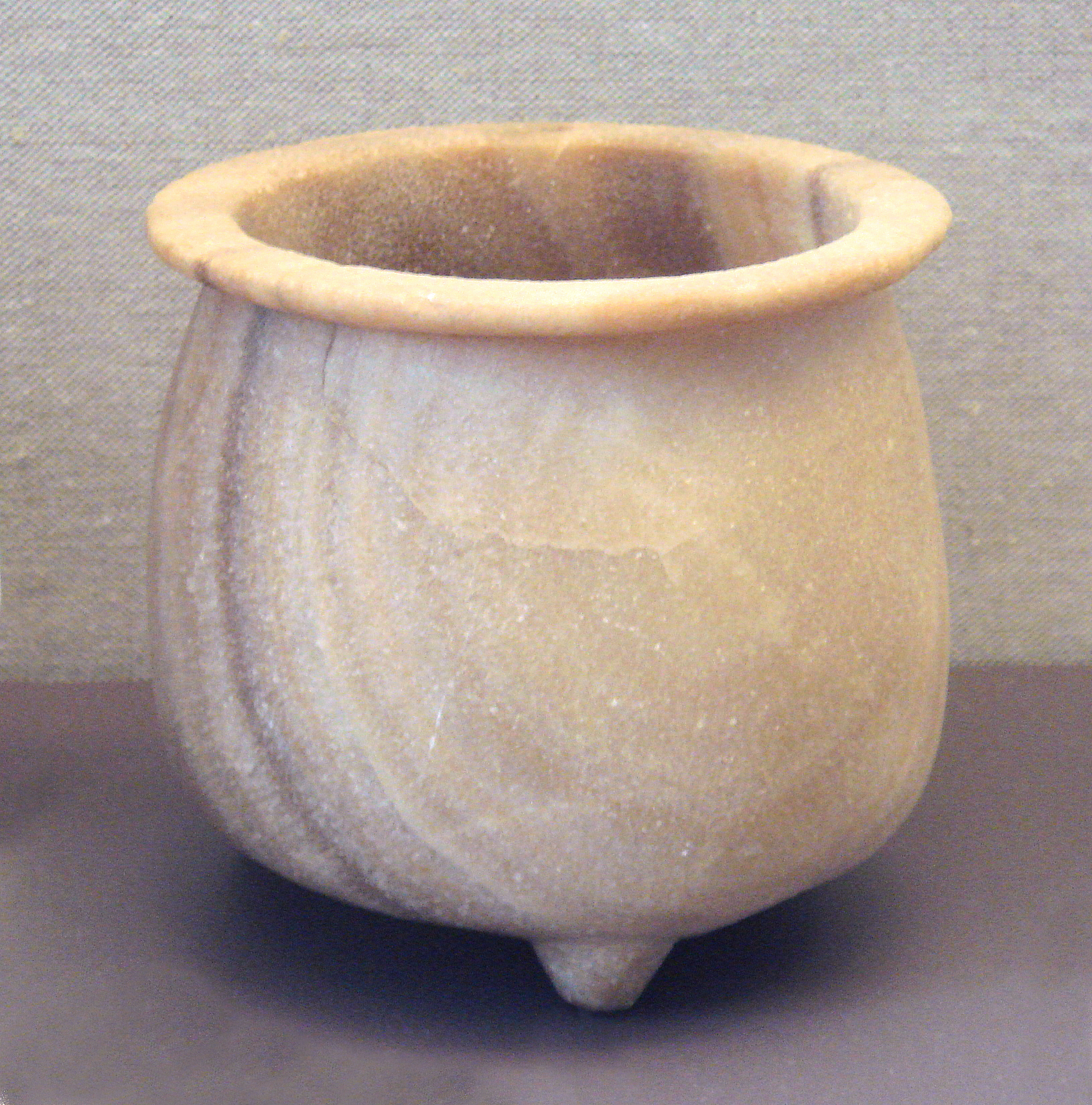
Calcite tripod vase, mid-Euphrates, probably from Tell Buqras, 6000 BC, Louvre Museum AO 31551.

==== First experiments with pottery (circa 7000 BC) ====
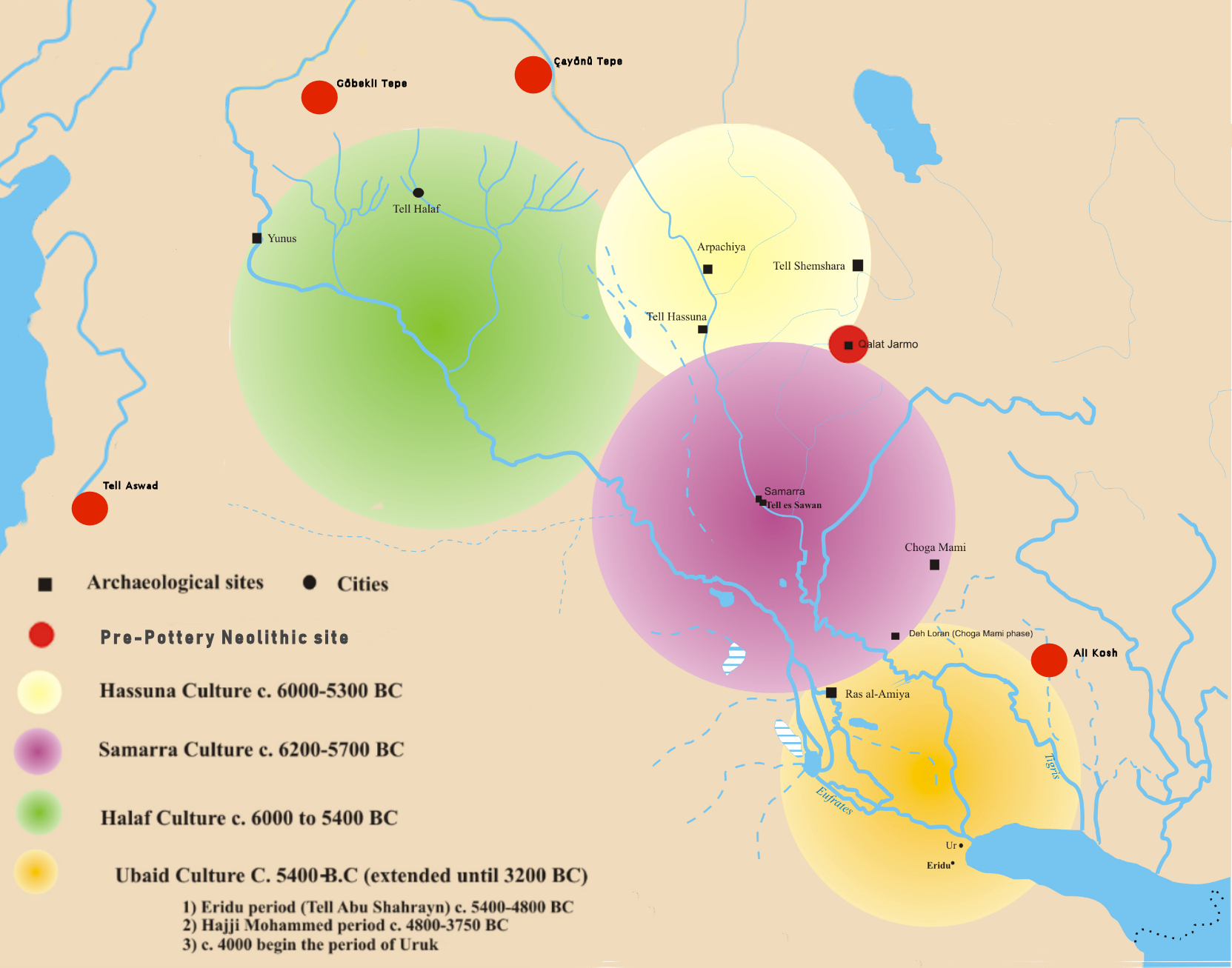
After the initial Pre-Pottery Neolithic phase from northwestern Mesopotamia to Jarmo (red dots, c. 7500 BC), 7th–5th millennium Mesopotamian art centered around the Hassuna culture in the north, the Halaf culture in the northwest, the Samarra culture in central Mesopotamia and the Ubaid culture in the southeast, which later expanded to encompass the whole region.

The northern Mesopotamian sites of Tell Hassuna and Jarmo are some of the oldest sites in the Near-East where pottery has been found, appearing in the most recent levels of excavation, which dates it to the 7th millennium BC. This pottery is handmade, of simple design and with thick sides, and treated with a vegetable solvent. There are clay figures, zoomorphic or anthropomorphic, including figures of pregnant women which are taken to be fertility goddesses, similar to the Mother Goddess of later Neolithic cultures in the same region.

=== Halaf culture (6000–5000 BC, Northwestern Mesopotamia) ===
Pottery was decorated with abstract geometric patterns and ornaments, especially in the Halaf culture, also known for its clay fertility figurines, painted with lines. Clay was all around and the main material; often modelled figures were painted with black decoration. Carefully crafted and dyed pots, especially jugs and bowls, were traded. As dyes, iron oxide containing clays were diluted in different degrees or various minerals were mixed to produce different colours.

The Halaf culture saw the earliest known appearance of stamp seals. They featured essentially geometric patterns.

Female fertility figurines in painted clay, possibly goddesses, also appear in this period, circa 6000–5100 BC.

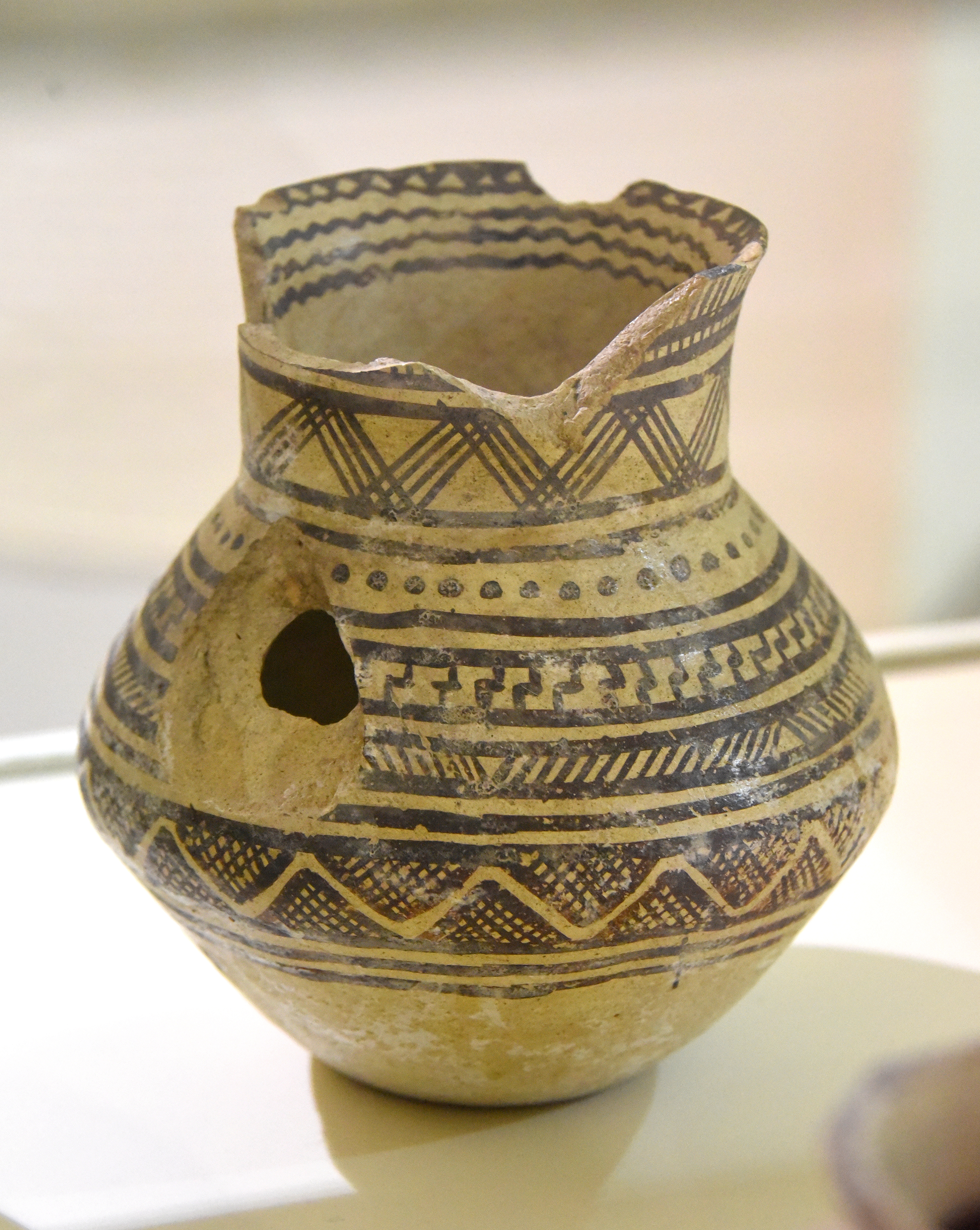
Jar decorated with diverse geometric patterns; 4900–4300 BC; ceramic; by Halaf culture; Erbil Civilization Museum (Erbil, Iraq)

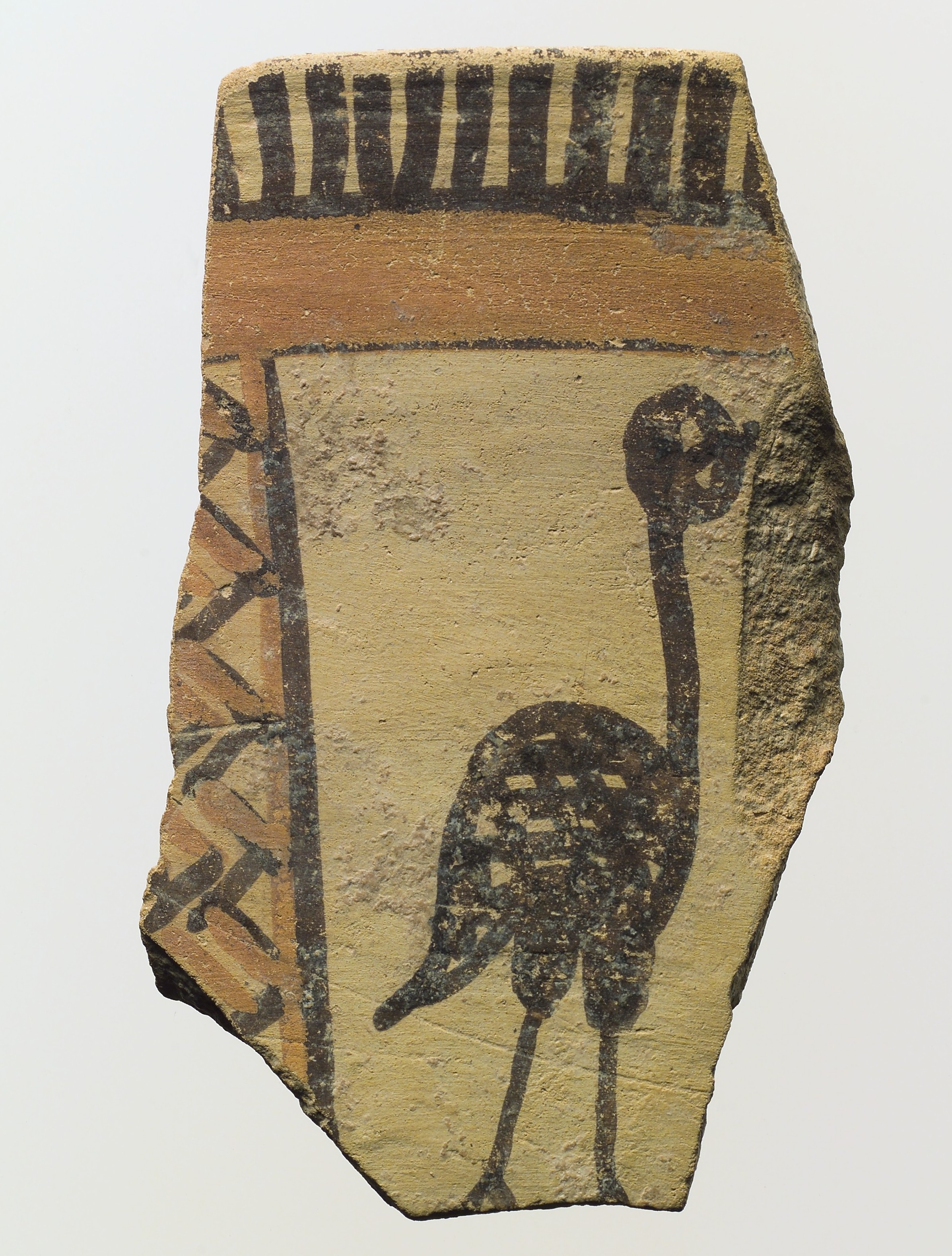
Shard; 5600–5000 BC; painted ceramic; 7.19 × 4.19 cm; by Halaf culture

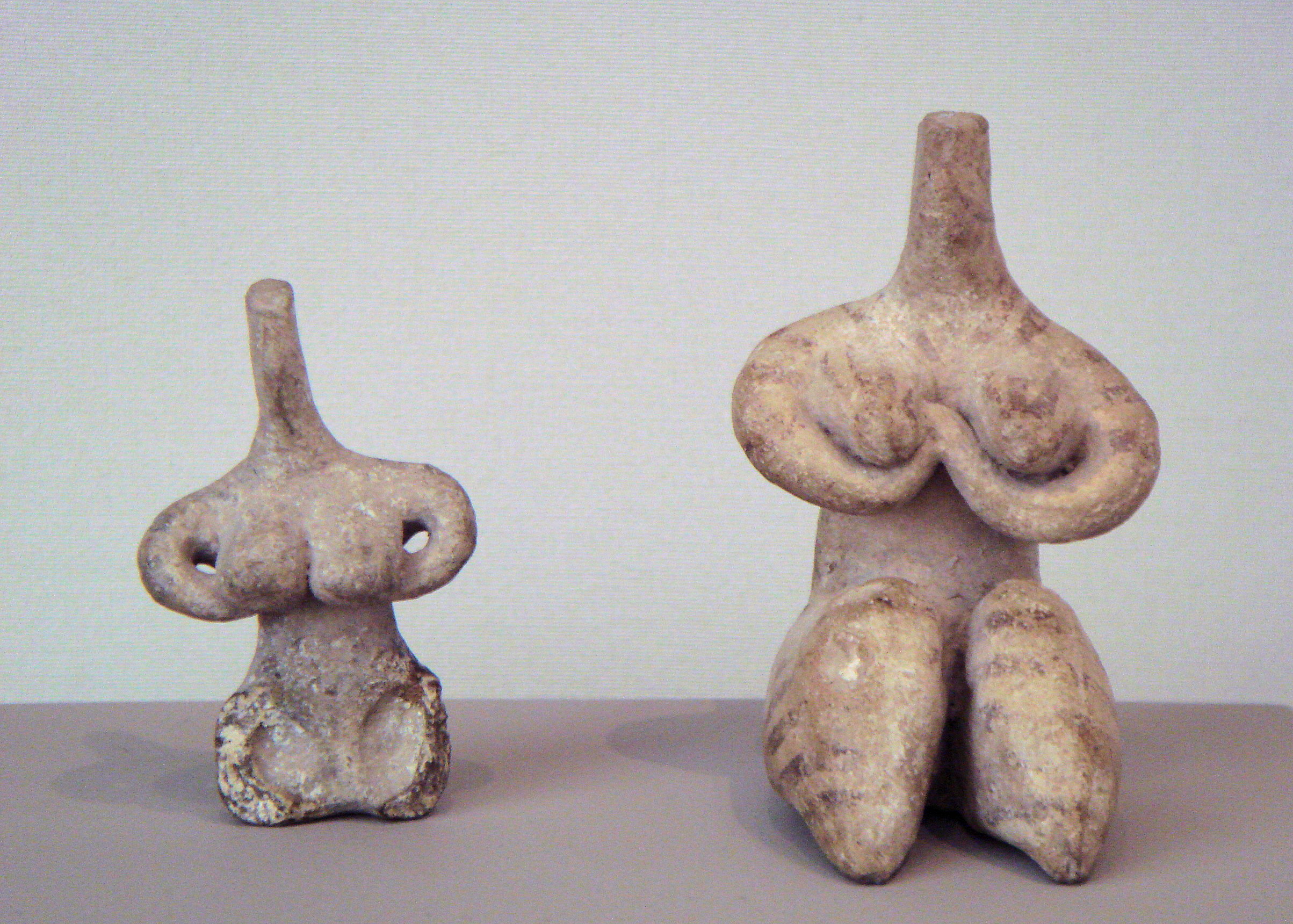
Halaf culture female figurines, 6000–5100 BC Louvre Museum

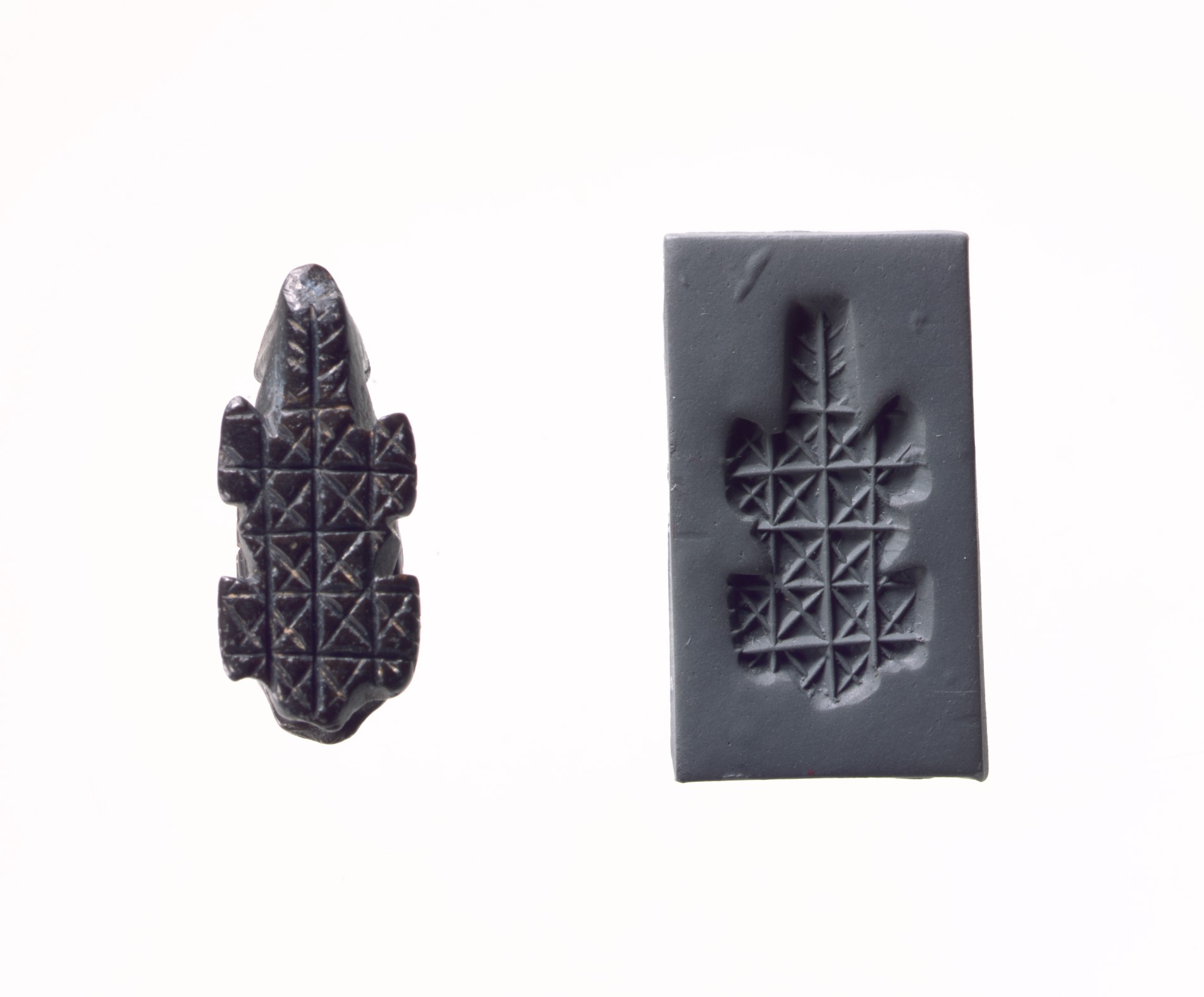
Stamp seal and modern impression- geometric pattern. Halaf culture

=== Hassuna culture (6000–5000 BC, Northern Mesopotamia) ===
The Hassuna culture is a Neolithic archaeological culture in northern Mesopotamia dating to the early sixth millennium BC. It is named after the type site of Tell Hassuna in Iraq. Other sites where Hassuna material has been found include Tell Shemshara. The decoration of pottery essentially consists in geometrical shapes, and a few ibex designs.

=== Samarra culture (6000–4800 BC, Central Mesopotamia) ===
The Samarra culture is a Chalcolithic archaeological culture in northern Mesopotamia that is roughly dated to 5500–4800 BCE. It partially overlaps with the Hassuna and early Ubaid.

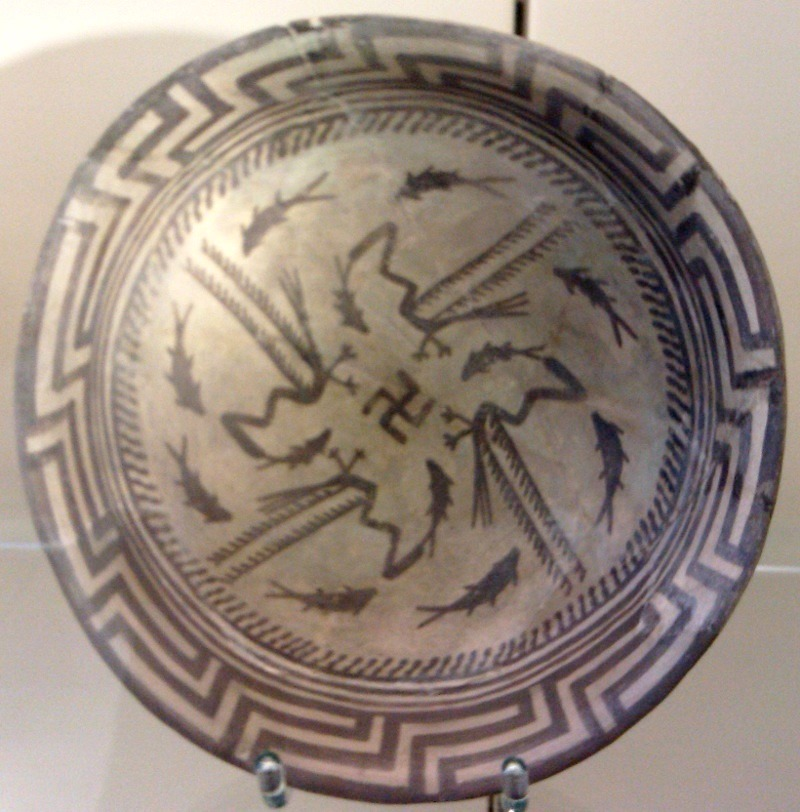
Samarra plate, with an abstract rim, a circle of eight fish, and four birds catching four fish that swim towards a central swastika; circa 4000 BC; painted ceramic; diameter: 27.7 cm; Vorderasiatisches Museum Berlin

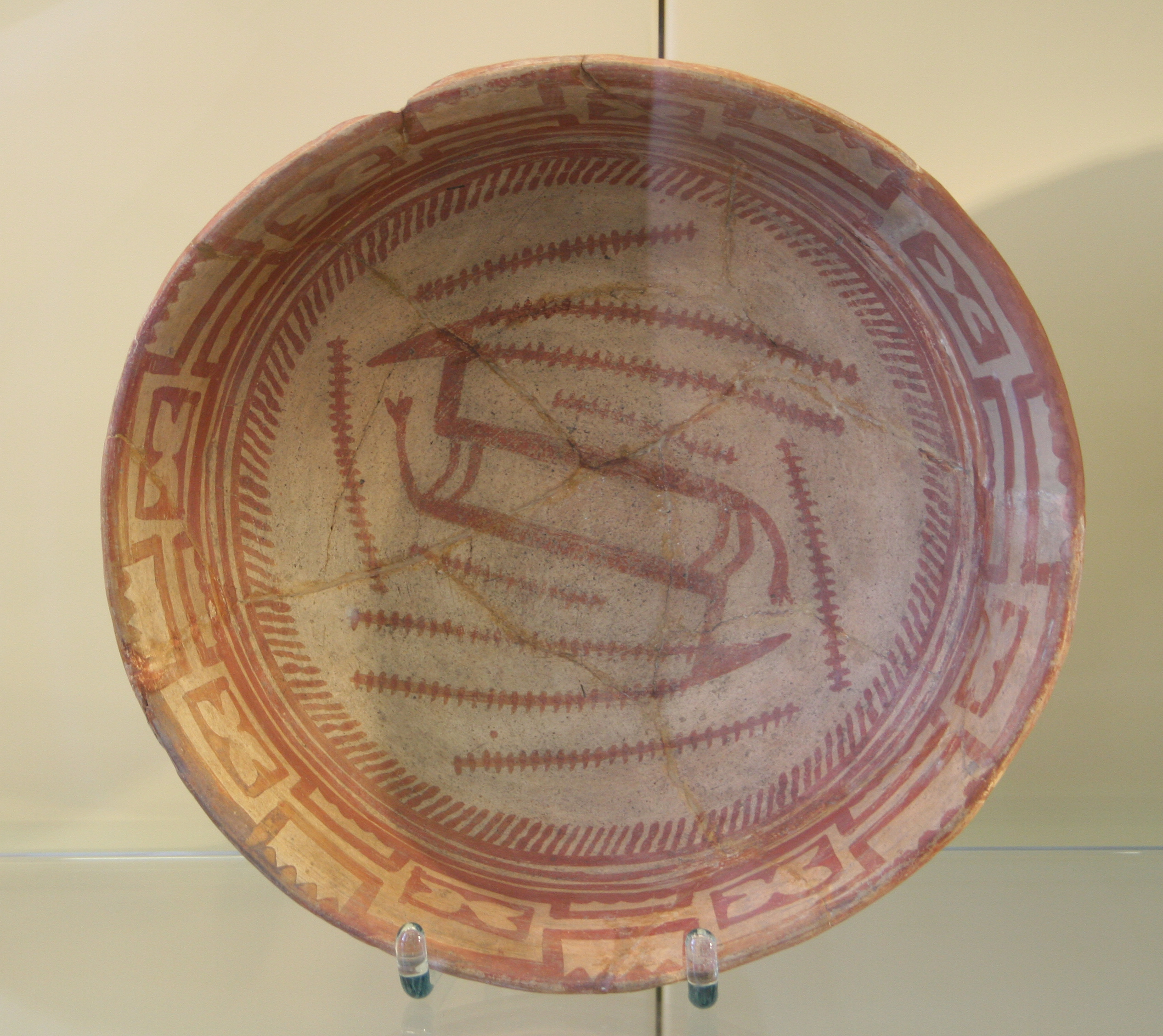
Samarra period fine ware, with central Ibex motif; circa 6200–5700 BC; Vorderasiatisches Museum

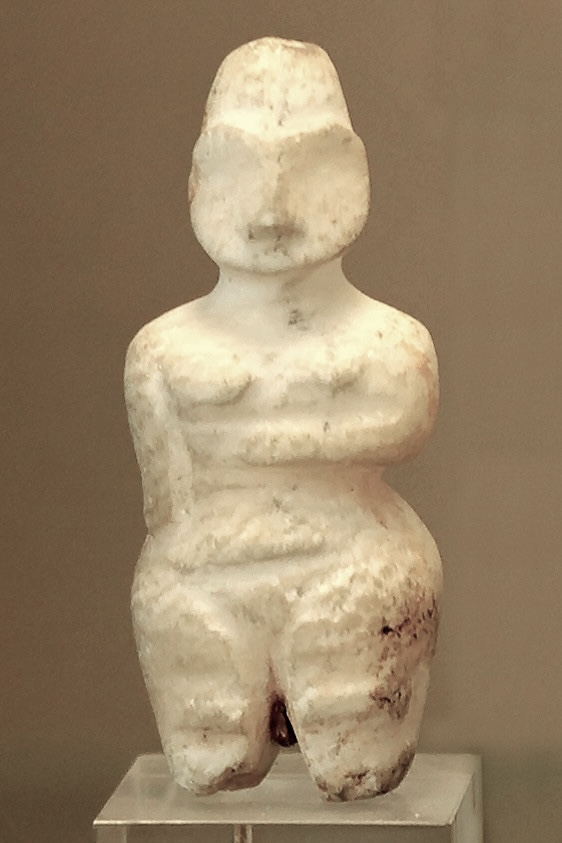
Female figurine found in the Tell es Sawwan (middle Tigris, near Samarra), level 1; circa 6000 BC; alabaster; Louvre

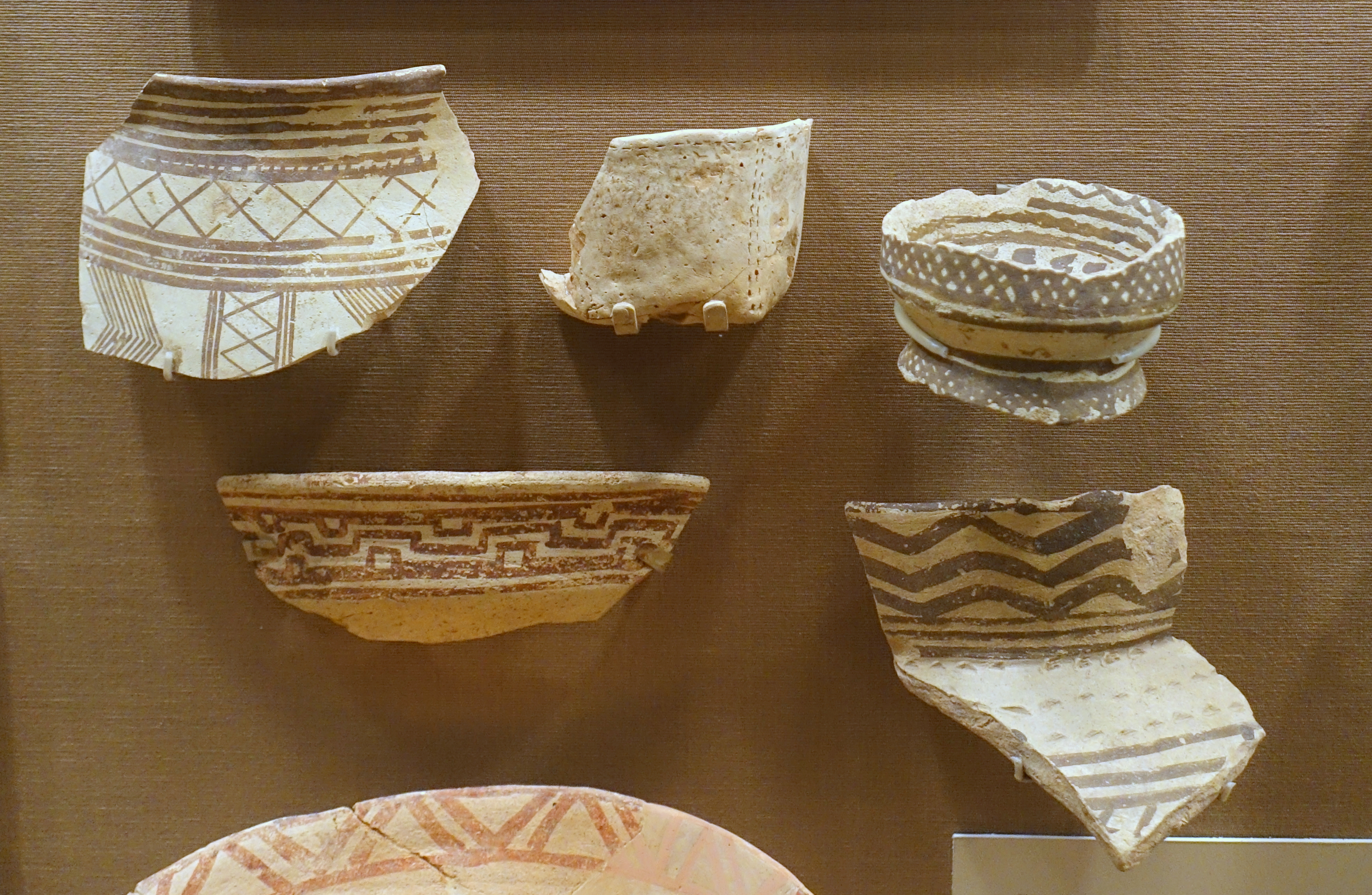
Fragment of Samarra pottery with geometrical designs in University of Chicago Oriental Institute (USA)

=== Ubaid culture (c. 6500–3800 BC, Southern Mesopotamia) ===
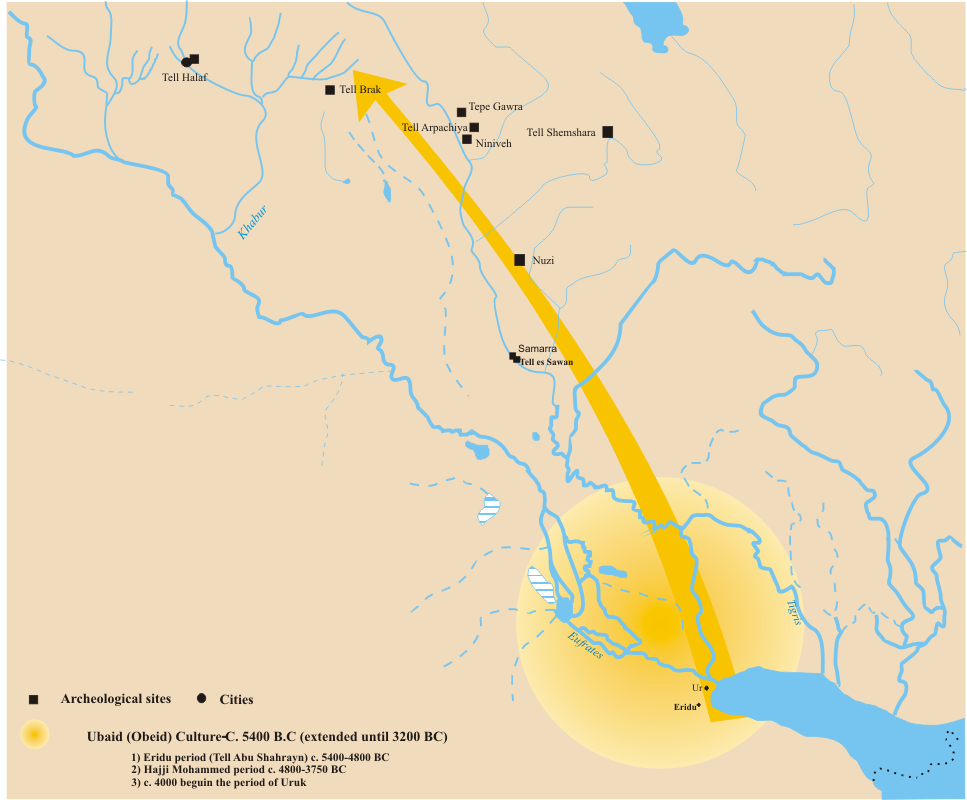
Northern expansion of the Ubaid culture after c. 4500 BC

The Ubaid period (c. 6500–3800 BC) is a prehistoric period of Mesopotamia. The name derives from Tell al-'Ubaid in Southern Mesopotamia, where the earliest large excavation of Ubaid period material was conducted initially by Henry Hall and later by Leonard Woolley.

In South Mesopotamia the period is the earliest known period on the alluvial plain although it is likely earlier periods exist obscured under the alluvium. In the south it has a very long duration between about 6500 and 3800 BC when it is replaced by the Uruk period.

In North Mesopotamia, Ubaid culture expanded during the period between about 5300 and 4300 BC. It is preceded by the Halaf period and the Halaf-Ubaid Transitional period and succeeded by the Late Chalcolithic period. The new period is named Northern Ubaid to distinguish it from the proper Ubaid in southern Mesopotamia.

With Ubaid 3 (circa 4500 BC) numerous examples of Ubaid pottery have been found along the Persian Gulf, as far as Dilmun, where Indus Valley civilization pottery has also been found.

Stamps seals start to depict animals in stylistic fashion, and also bear the first known depiction of the Master of Animals at the end of the period, circa 4000 BC.

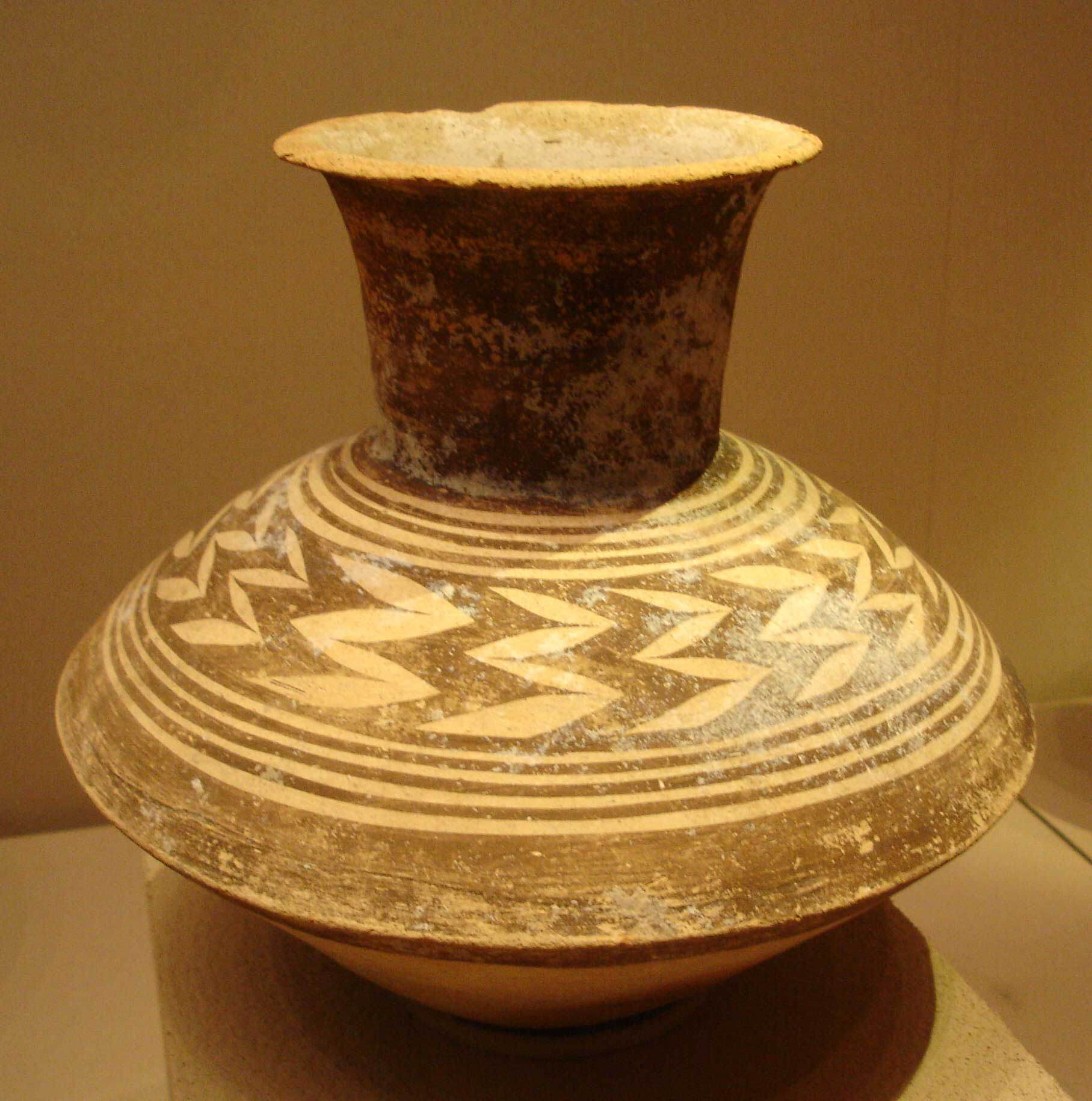
Jar; Late Ubaid period (4500–4000 BC); pottery; from Southern Iraq; Museum of Fine Arts, Boston (USA)

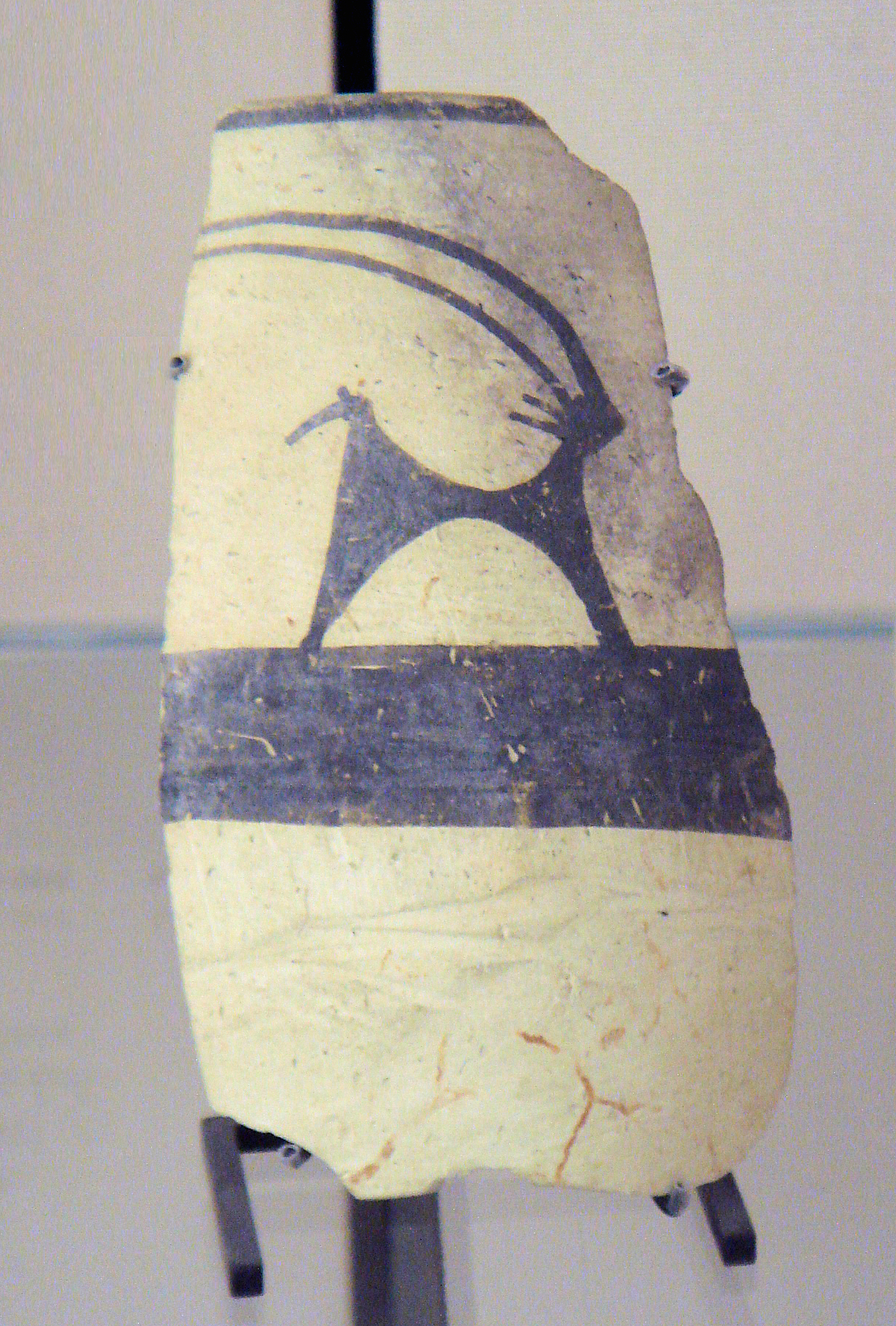
Fragment of pottery with a painting of an Ibex; 4700–4200 BC; painted ceramic; from Girsu; Louvre

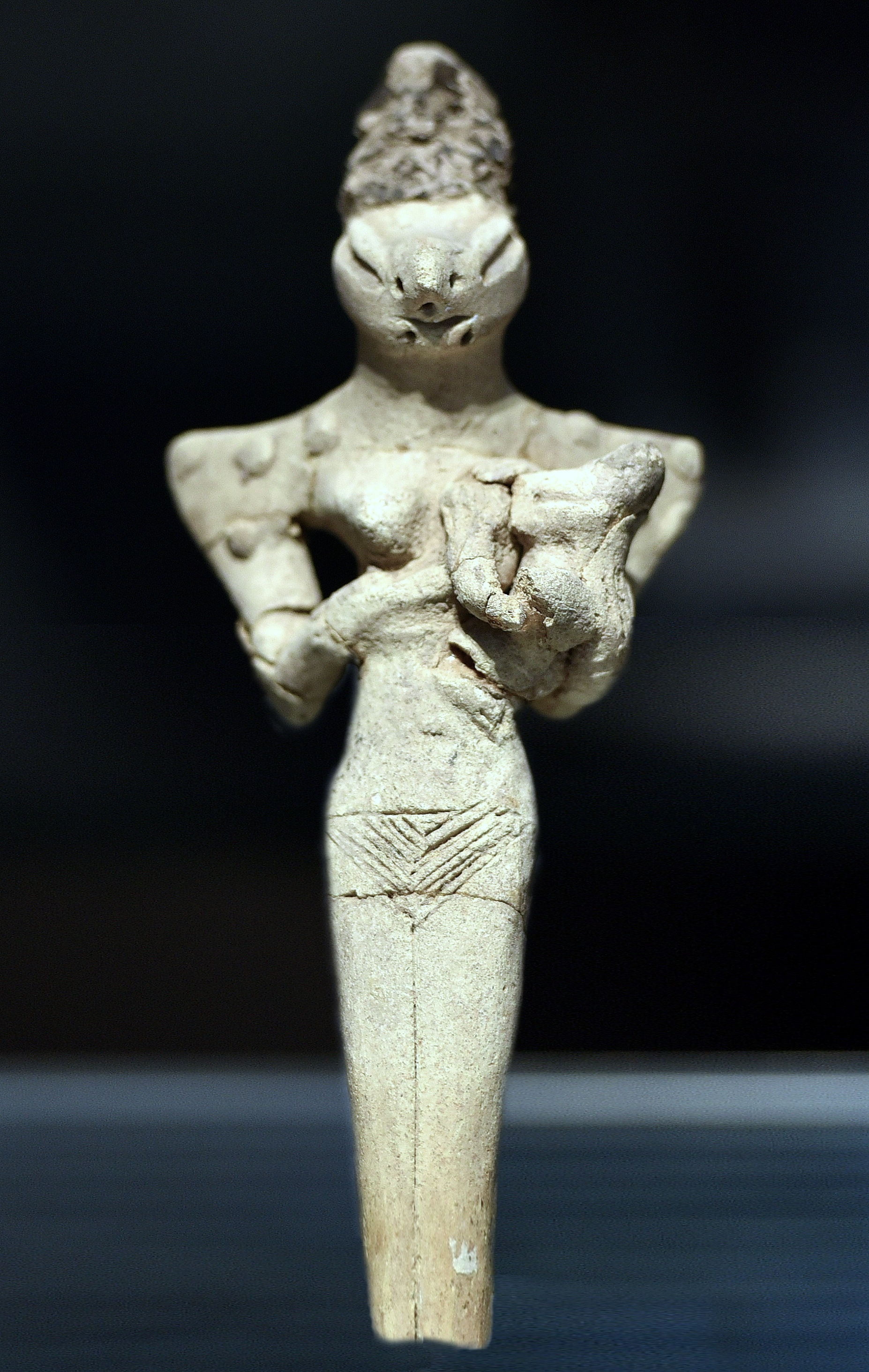
Lizard-headed nude woman nursing a child, Ur, Ubaid 4 period, 4500-4000 BCE, Iraq Museum. "The elongated head, similar to the figures found at Eridu, could represent an elaborate headdress or possibly cranial binding".

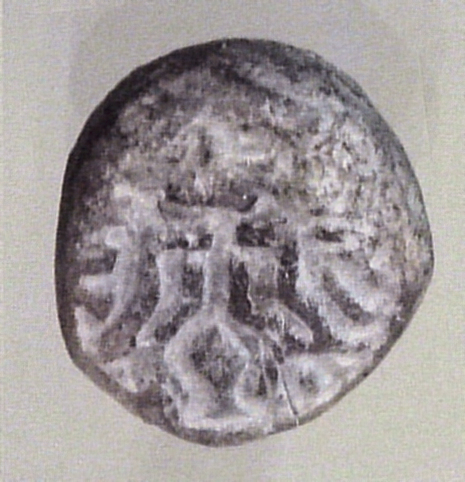
Terracotta stamp seal with Master of Animals motif, Tello, ancient Girsu, End of Ubaid period, Louvre Museum AO14165. circa 4000 BC.

== Historic Mesopotamia ==
=== Sumerian period (c. 4000–2334 BC) ===
The rise of the non-Semitic-speaking Sumerian culture spans a period of about two millennia, and saw the development of sophisticated artistic traditions, as well as the invention of writing, first through pictographic signs, and then through cuneiforms.

==== Pre-Dynastic period: Uruk (c. 4000 to 3100 BC) ====
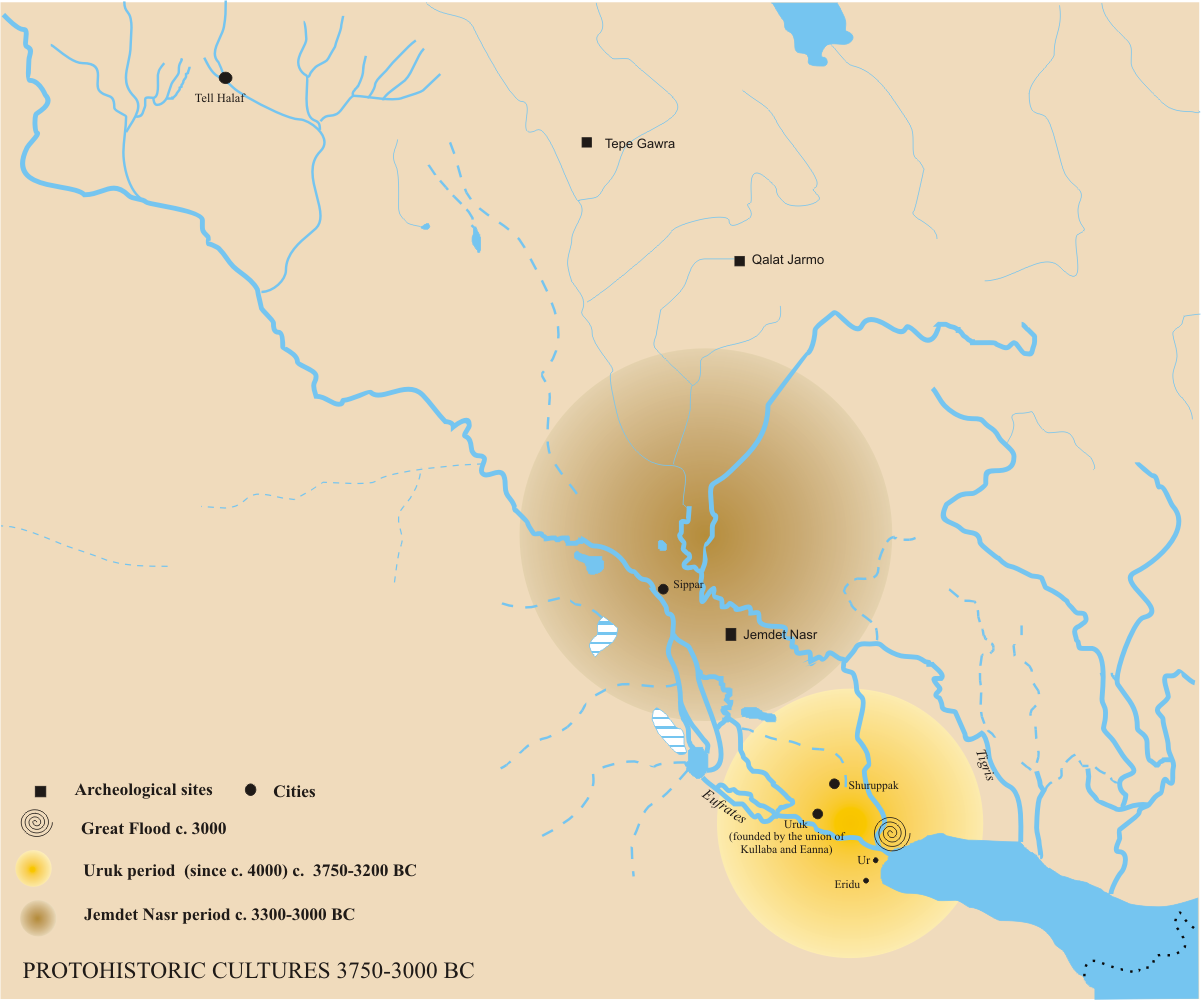
The historic, proto-literate, period starts with the cultures of the Uruk period (centered on the area in yellow) and Jemdet Nasr period (in brown).

The Protoliterate or Uruk period, named after the city of Uruk in southern Mesopotamia, (ca. 4000 to 3100 BC) existed from the protohistoric Chalcolithic to Early Bronze Age period, following the Ubaid period and succeeded by the Jemdet Nasr period generally dated to 3100–2900 BC. It saw the emergence of urban life in Mesopotamia, and the beginnings of Sumerian civilization, and also the first "great creative age" of Mesopotamian art. Slightly earlier, the northern city of Tell Brak, today in Syria, also saw urbanization, and the development of a temple with regional significance. This is called the Eye Temple after the many "eye idols", in fact votive offerings, found there, a type distinctive to this site. The stone Tell Brak Head, 7 inches high, shows a simplified face; similar heads are in gypsum. These were evidently fitted to bodies that have not survived, probably of wood. Like temples further south, the Eye Temple was decorated with cone mosaics made up of clay cylinders some four inches long, differently coloured to create simple patterns.

Significant works from the southern cities in Sumer proper are the Warka Vase and Uruk Trough, with complex multi-figured scenes of humans and animals, and the Mask of Warka. This is a more realistic head than the Tell Brak examples, like them made to top a wooden body; what survives of this is only the basic framework, to which coloured inlays, gold leaf hair, paint and jewellery were added. It could depict a temple goddess. Shells may have served as the whites of the eyes, and the lapis lazuli, a beautiful, blue semi-precious gemstone, may have formed the pupils. The Guennol Lioness is an exceptionally powerful small figurine of a lion-headed monster, perhaps from the start of the next period.

There are a number of stone or alabaster vessels carved in deep relief, and stone friezes of animals, both designed for temples, where the vessels held offerings. Cylinder seals are already complex and very finely executed and, as later, seem to have been an influence on larger works. Animals shown are often representations of the gods, another continuing feature of Mesopotamian art. The end of the period, despite being a time of considerable economic expansion, saw a decline in the quality of art, perhaps as demand outstripped the supply of artists.

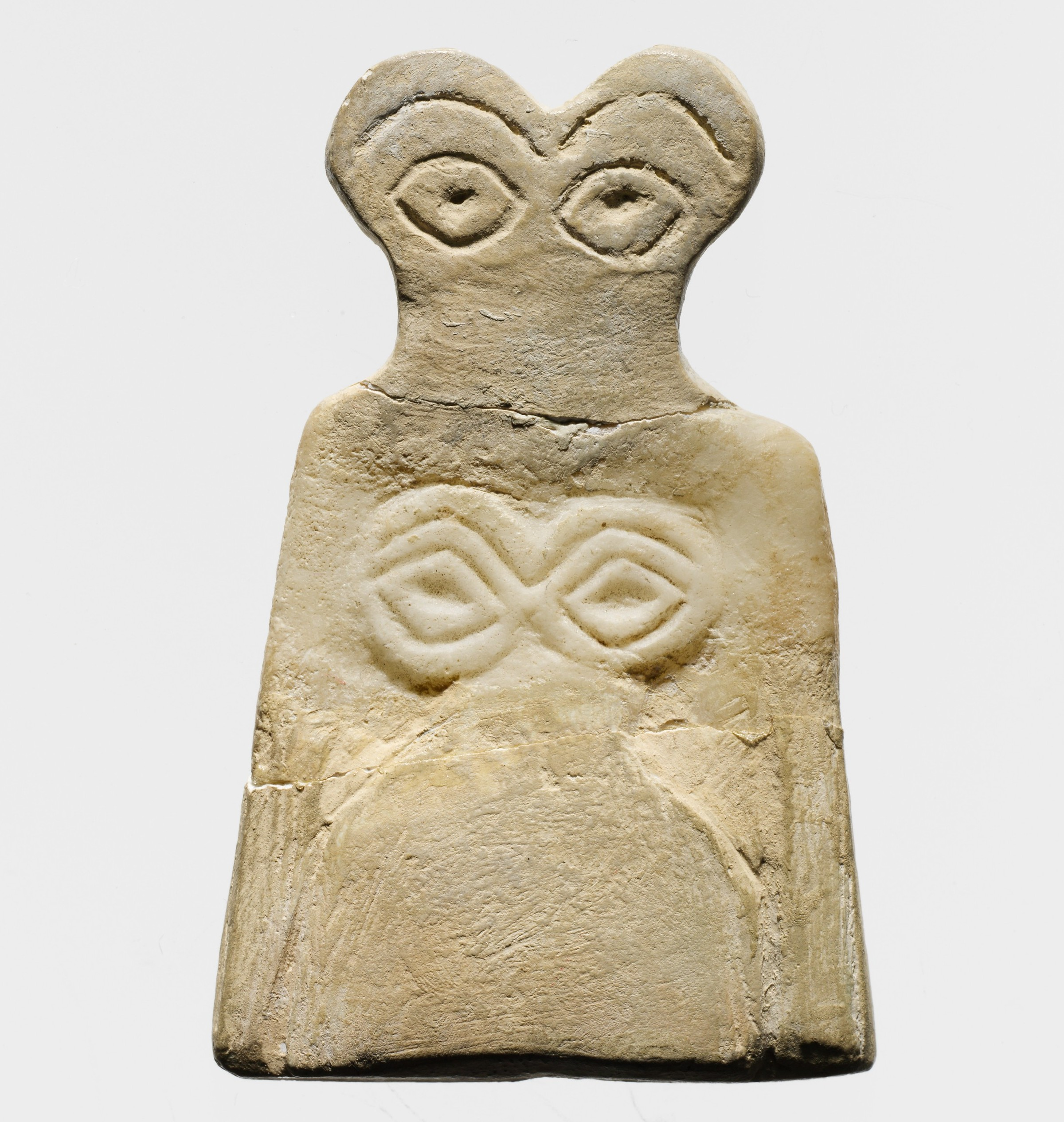
Eye idol; 3700–3500 BC; gypsum alabaster; 6.5 × 4.2 × 0.6 cm; Metropolitan Museum of Art

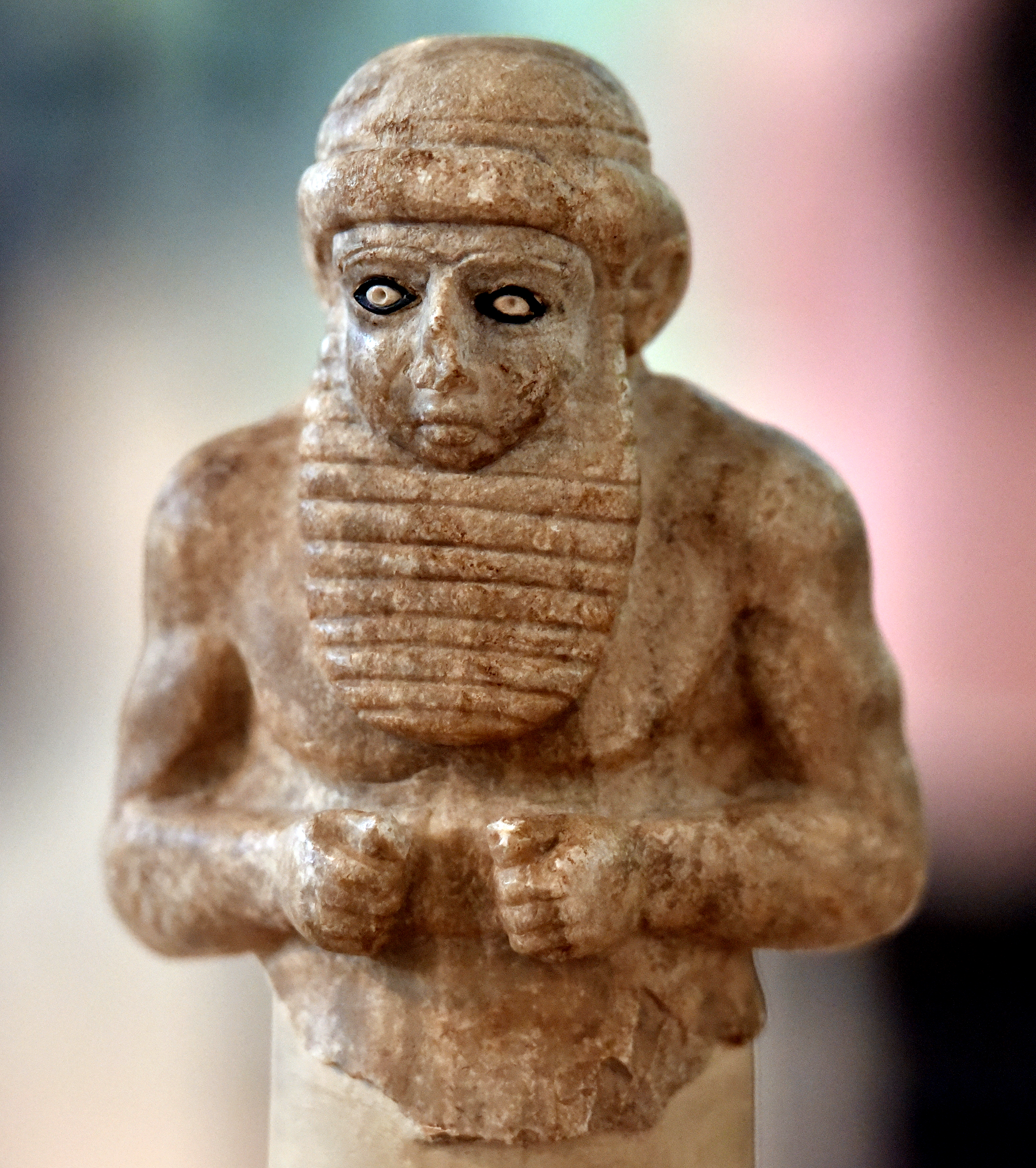
Sumerian dignitary, Uruk, circa 3300-3000 BCE. National Museum of Iraq.

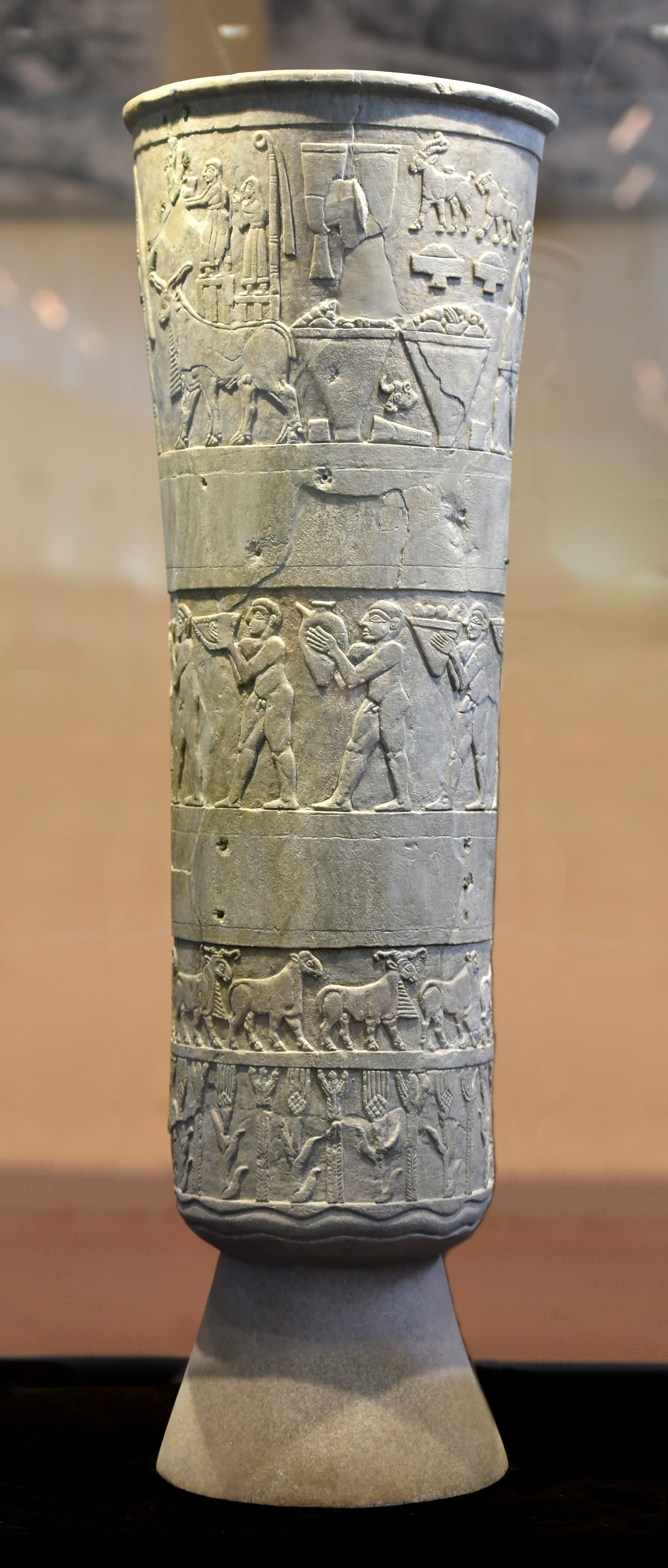
The original Warka Vase, in the National Museum of Iraq. It is one of the earliest surviving works of narrative relief sculpture, dated to c. 3200–3000 BC.

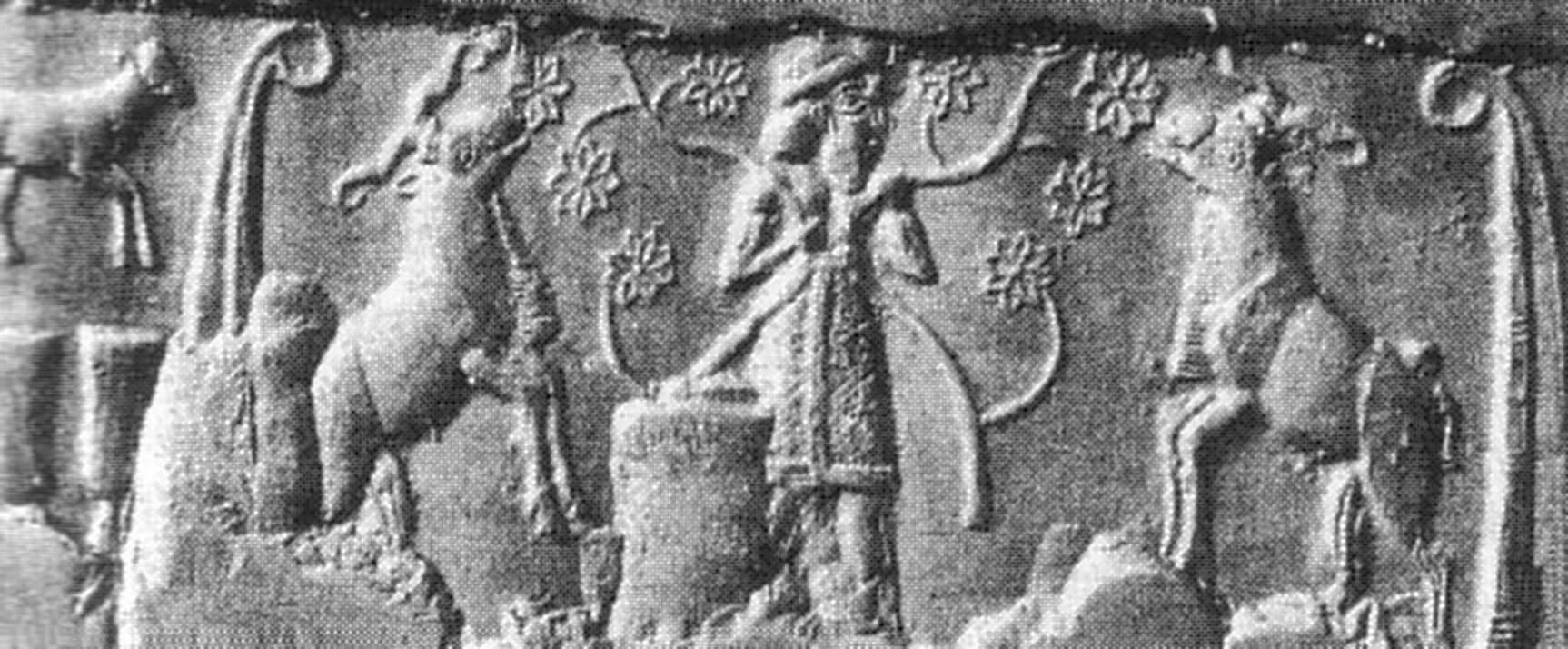
Cylinder seal impression from Uruk, showing a "king-priest" in brimmed hat and long coat feeding the herd of goddess Inanna, symbolized by two rams, framed by reed bundles as on the Uruk Vase. Late Uruk period, 3300–3000 BC. A similar king-priest also appears standing on a ship.

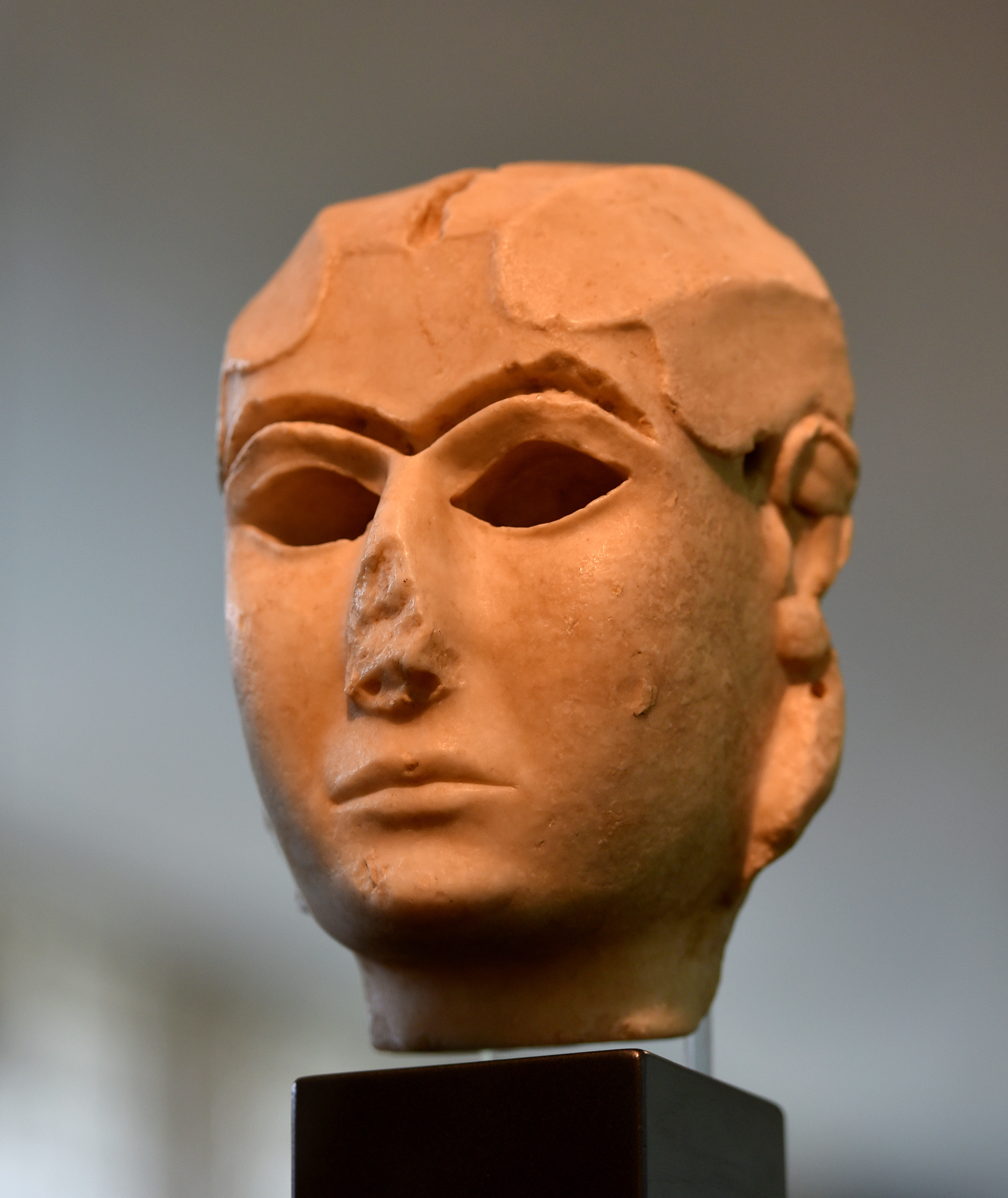
The Mask of Warka; 3300–3000 BC; gypsum alabaster; National Museum of Iraq (Baghdad)

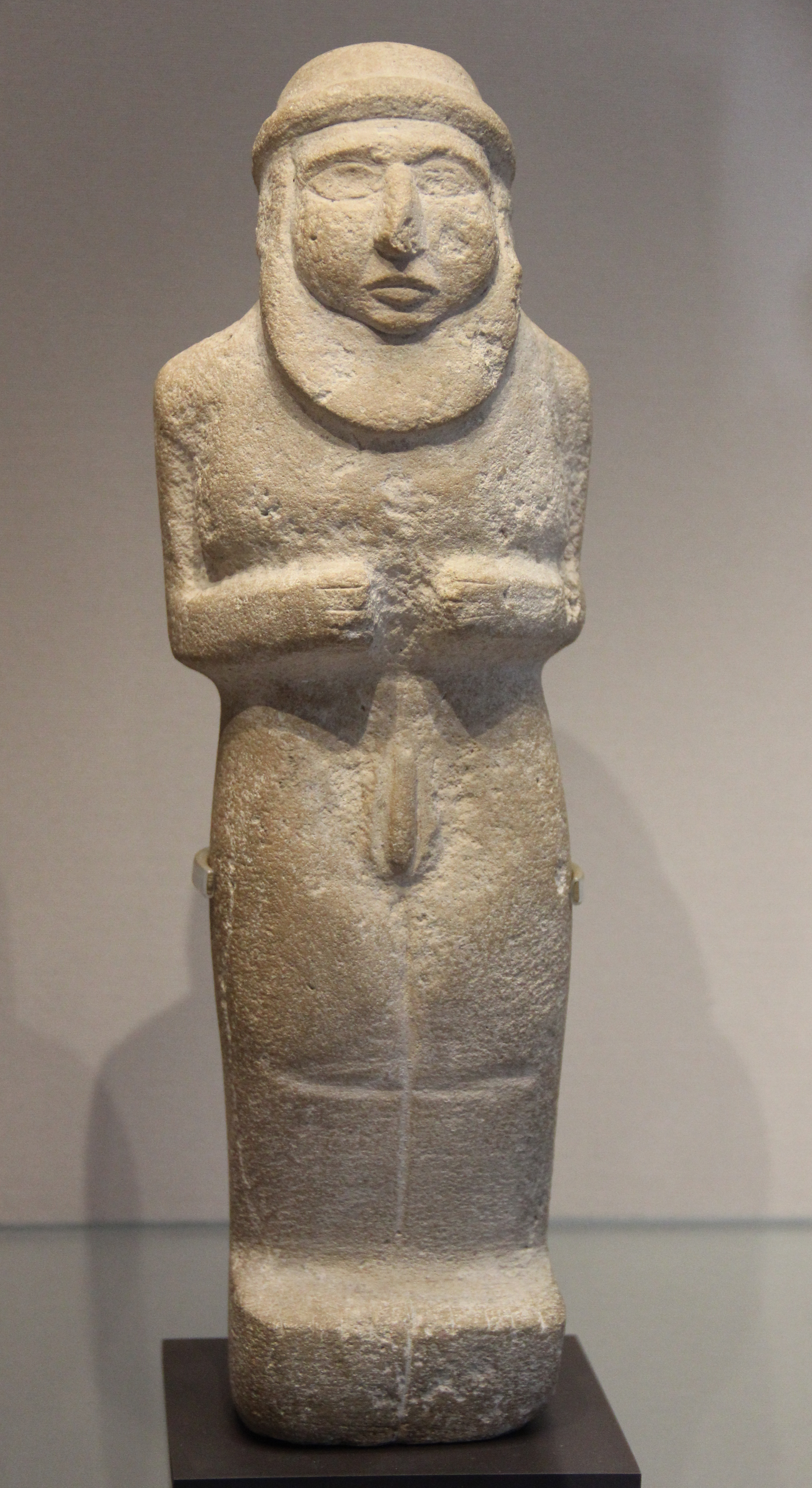
Sculpture of the ritually nude 'Priest-King', Late Uruk, Louvre.

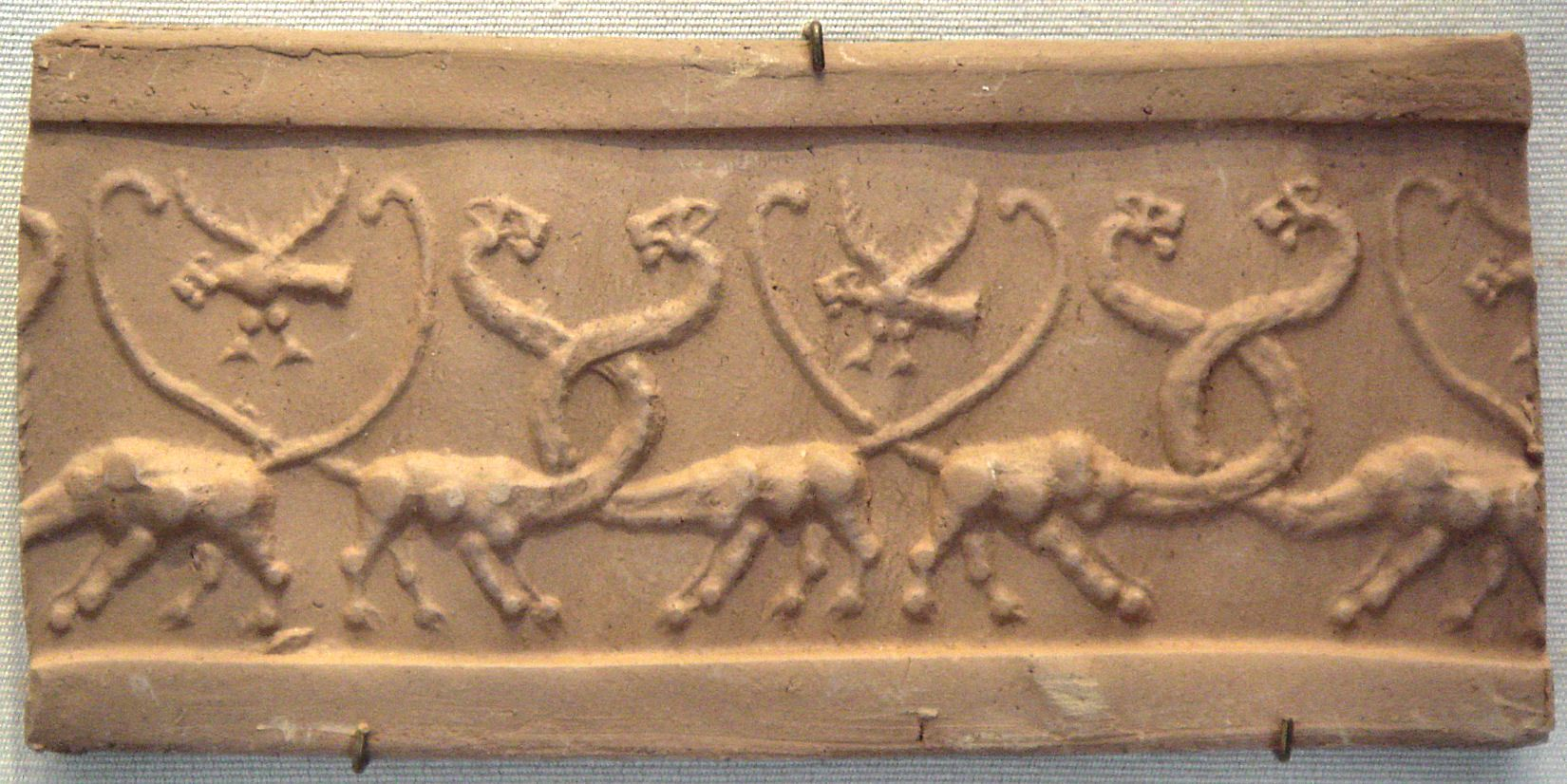
Cylinder seal with serpopards (monstrous lions) and lion-headed eagles; 4100–3000 BC; jasper; Louvre. This design was also adopted in Egypt as a consequence of Egypt-Mesopotamia relations.

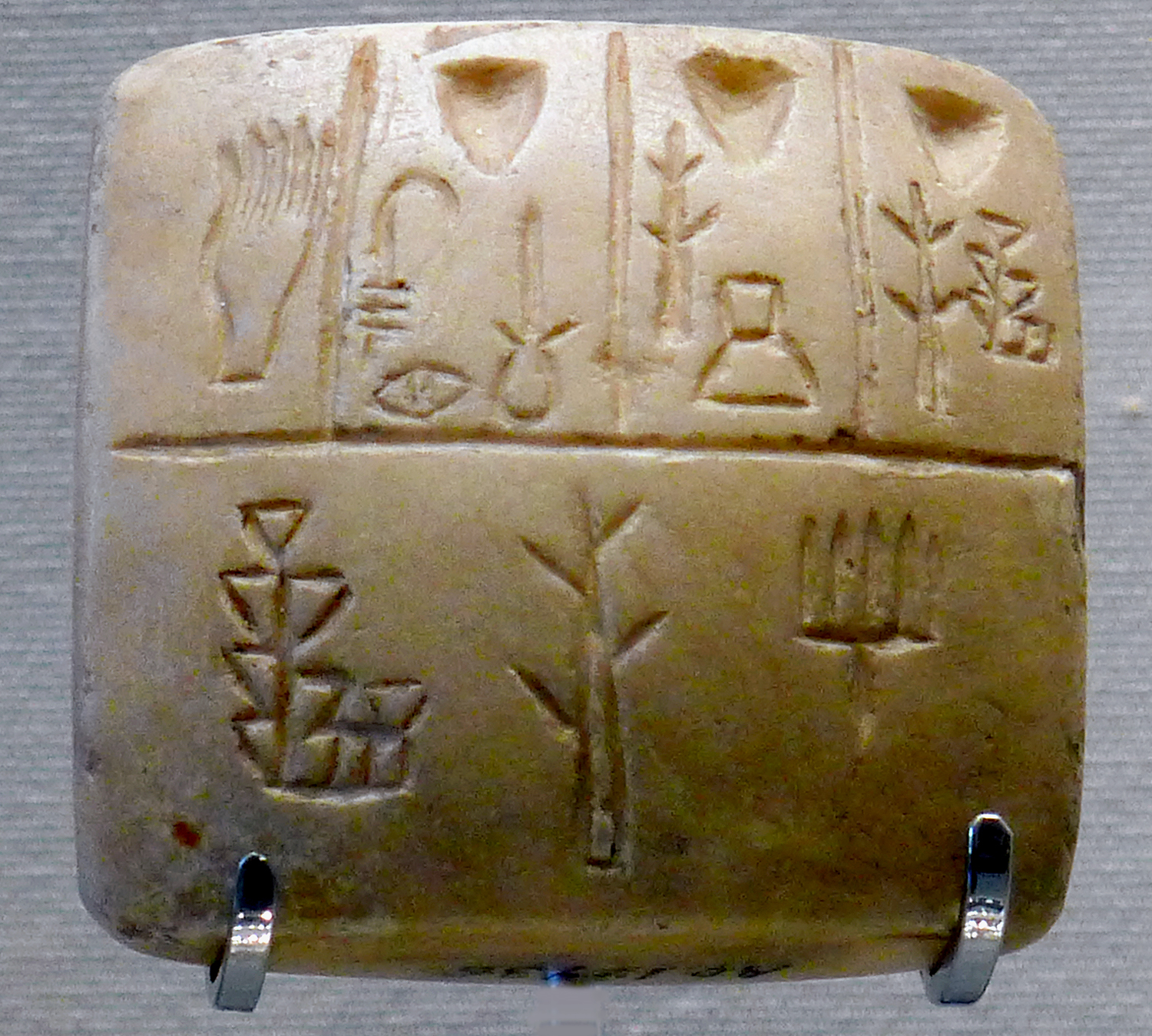
Tablets with proto-cuneiform pictographic characters, were used for noting commercial transactions (end of 4th millennium BC), Uruk III.

===== Early artistic exchanges with Egypt (c. 3500–3200 BC) =====
Mesopotamian king on Egyptian prehistoric knife
(3400–3200 BC)

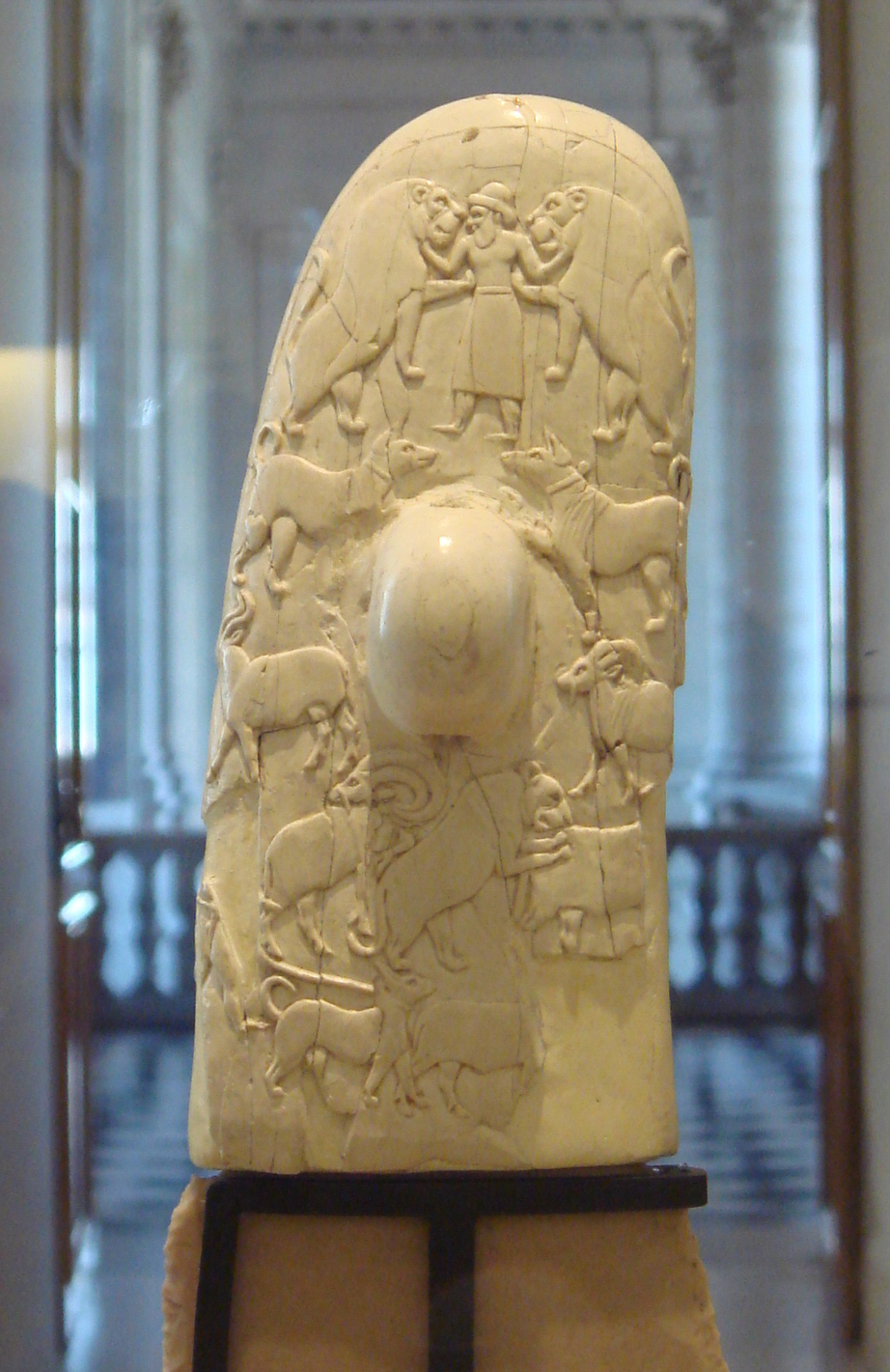
Gebel el-Arak Knife, 3400–3200 BC, Abydos, Egypt.

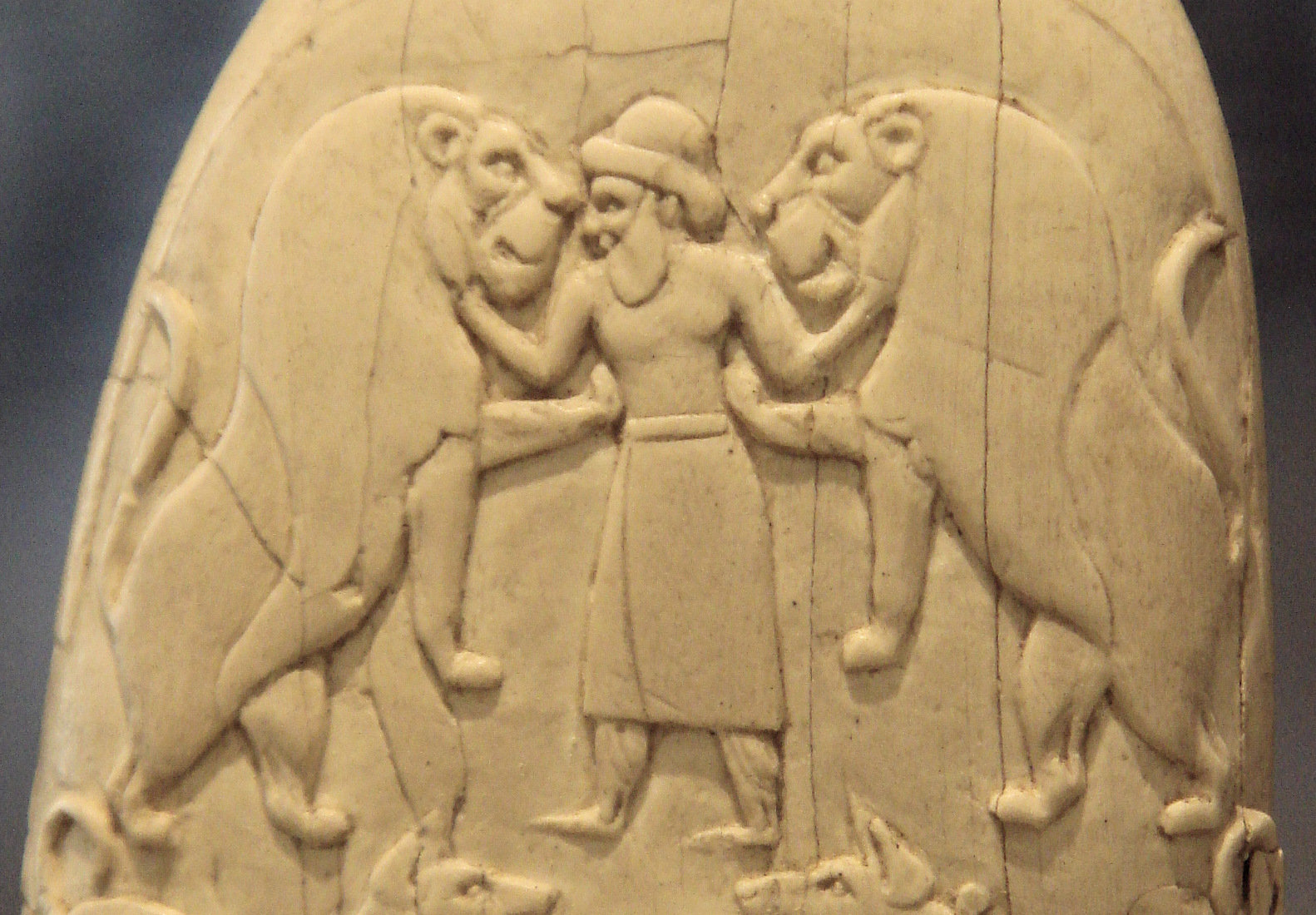
Mesopotamian king as Master of Animals (detail), showing the influence of Mesopotamian art on Egypt at an early date.

Egypt–Mesopotamia relations seem to have developed from the 4th millennium BCE, starting in the Uruk period for Mesopotamia and the Gerzean culture of pre-literate Prehistoric Egypt (circa 3500–3200 BC). Influences can be seen in the Pre-Dynastic Art of Ancient Egypt, in imported products, and also in the possible transfer of writing from Mesopotamia to Egypt, and generated "deep-seated" parallels in the early stages of both cultures.

Distinctly Mesopotamian objects and art forms entered Egypt during this period, indicating exchanges and contacts. The designs that were emulated by Egyptian artists are numerous: the Uruk "priest-king" with his tunique and brimmed hat in the posture of the Master of animals, the serpopards or sepo-felines, winged griffins, snakes around rosettes, boats with high prows, all characteristic of Mesopotamian art of the Late Uruk (Uruk IV, c. 3350–3200 BC) period. The same "Priest-King" in visible in several Mesopotamian works of art of the end of the Uruk period, such as the Blau Monuments, cylinder seals and statues.

==== Pre-Dynastic period: Jemdet Nasr (3100–2900 BC) ====
The Jemdet Nasr Period covers the period from 3100 to 2900 BC. It is named after the type site Tell Jemdet Nasr, where the assemblage typical for this period was first recognized. Its geographical distribution is limited to south-central Iraq. The culture of the proto-historical Jemdet Nasr period is a local development out of the preceding Uruk period and continues into the Early Dynastic I period. The period is characterized by splendidly painted monochrome and polychrome pottery, as well as the appearance of large proto-cuneiform tablets, clearly going beyond the initial pictographic writing.

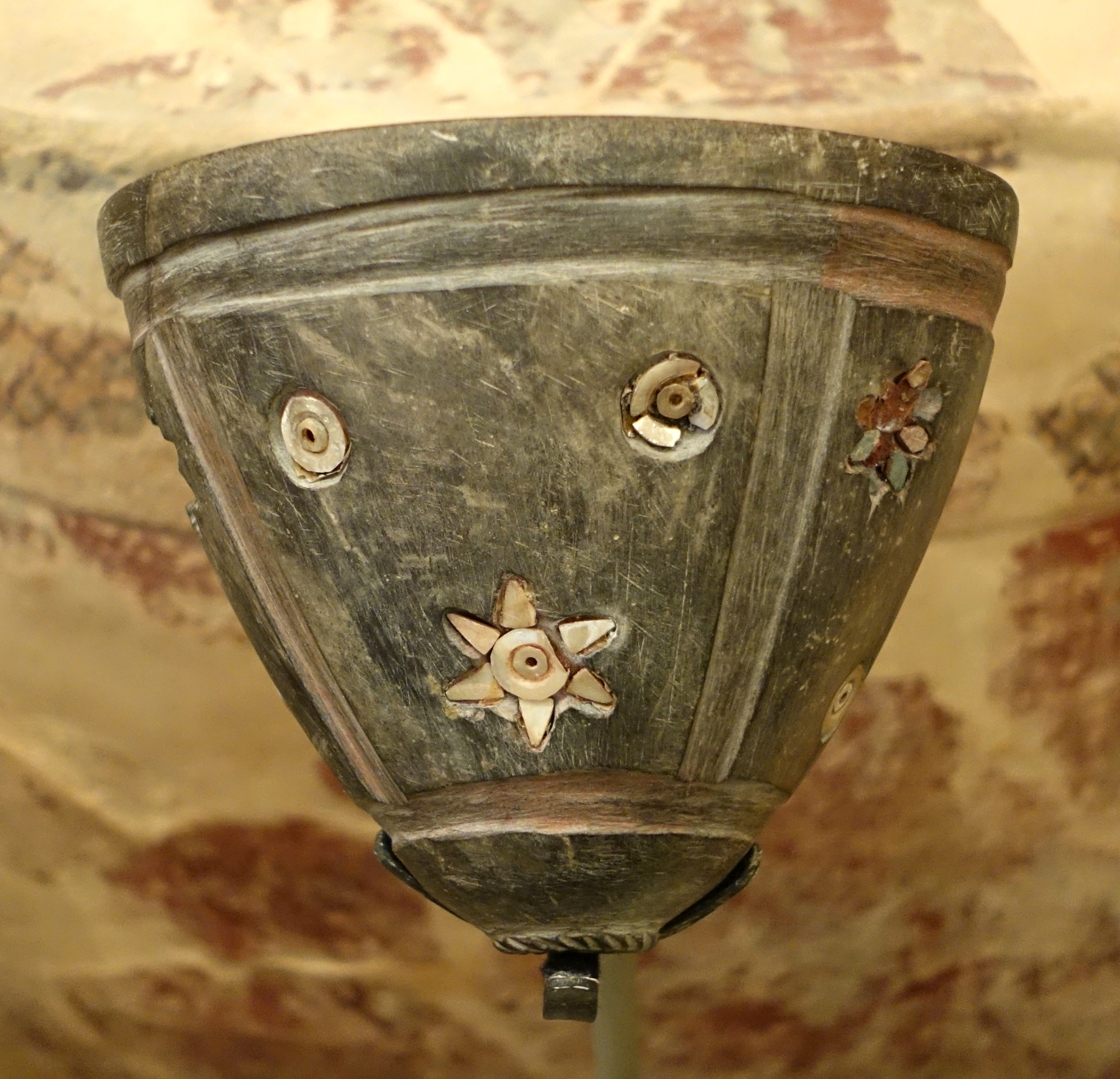
Djemdet Nasr stone bowl, once inlaid with mother-of-pearl, red paste, and bitumen.

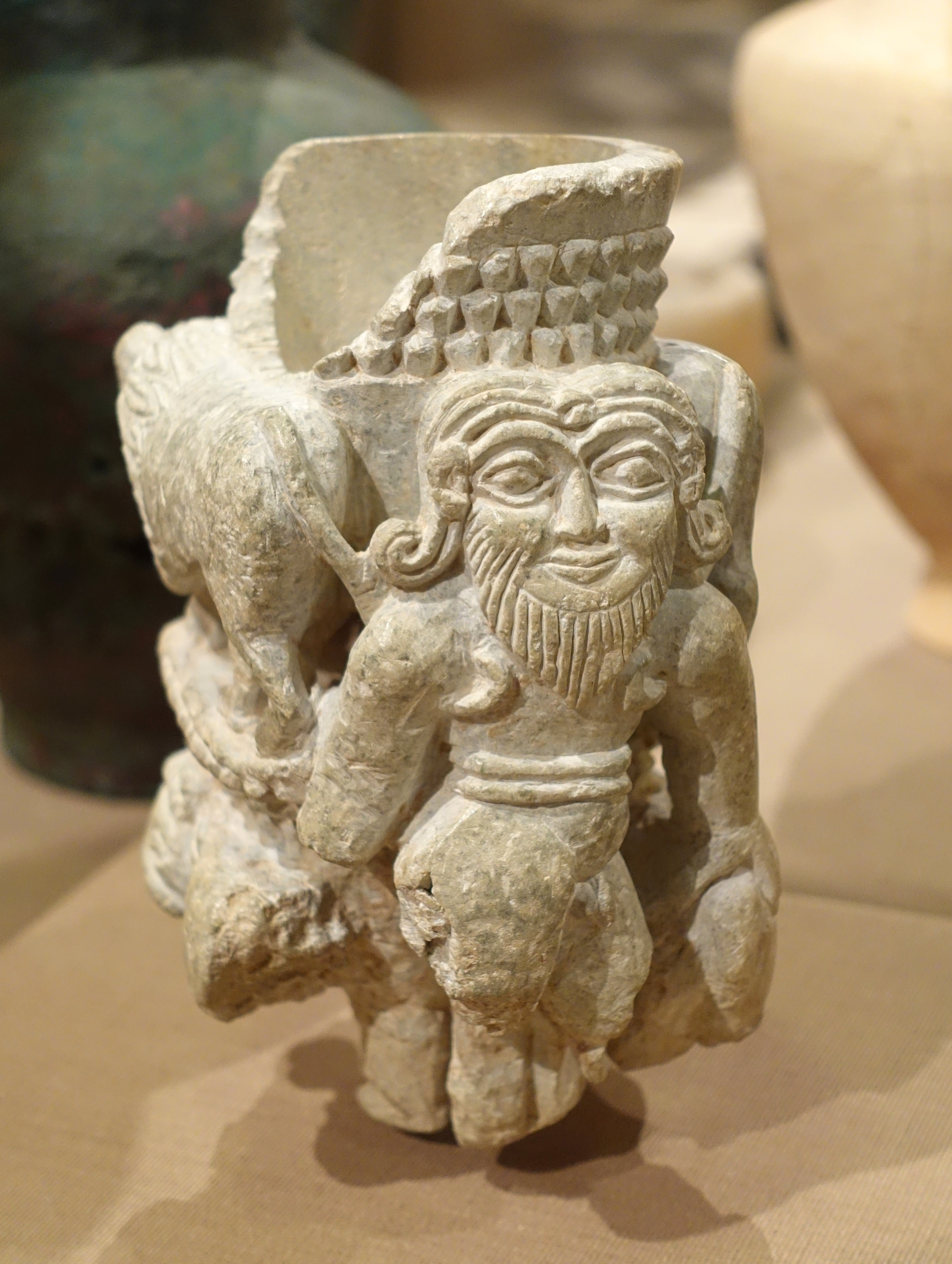
Cup with Nude Hero, Bulls and Lions, Tell Agrab, Jamdat Nasr to Early Dynastic period, 3000–2600 BC.

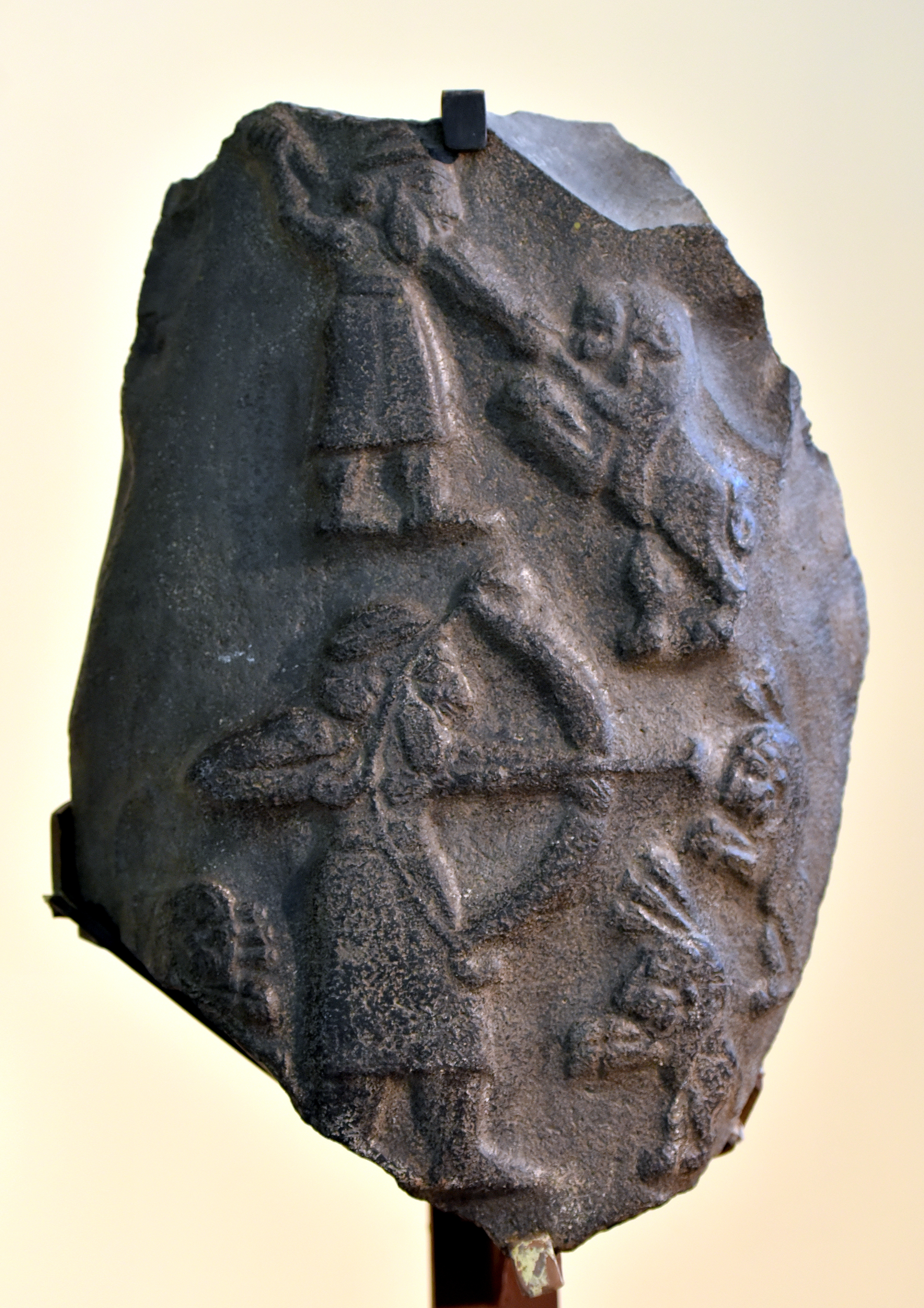
Stele of lion hunt, Uruk, Iraq, 3000-2900 BC. National Museum of Iraq

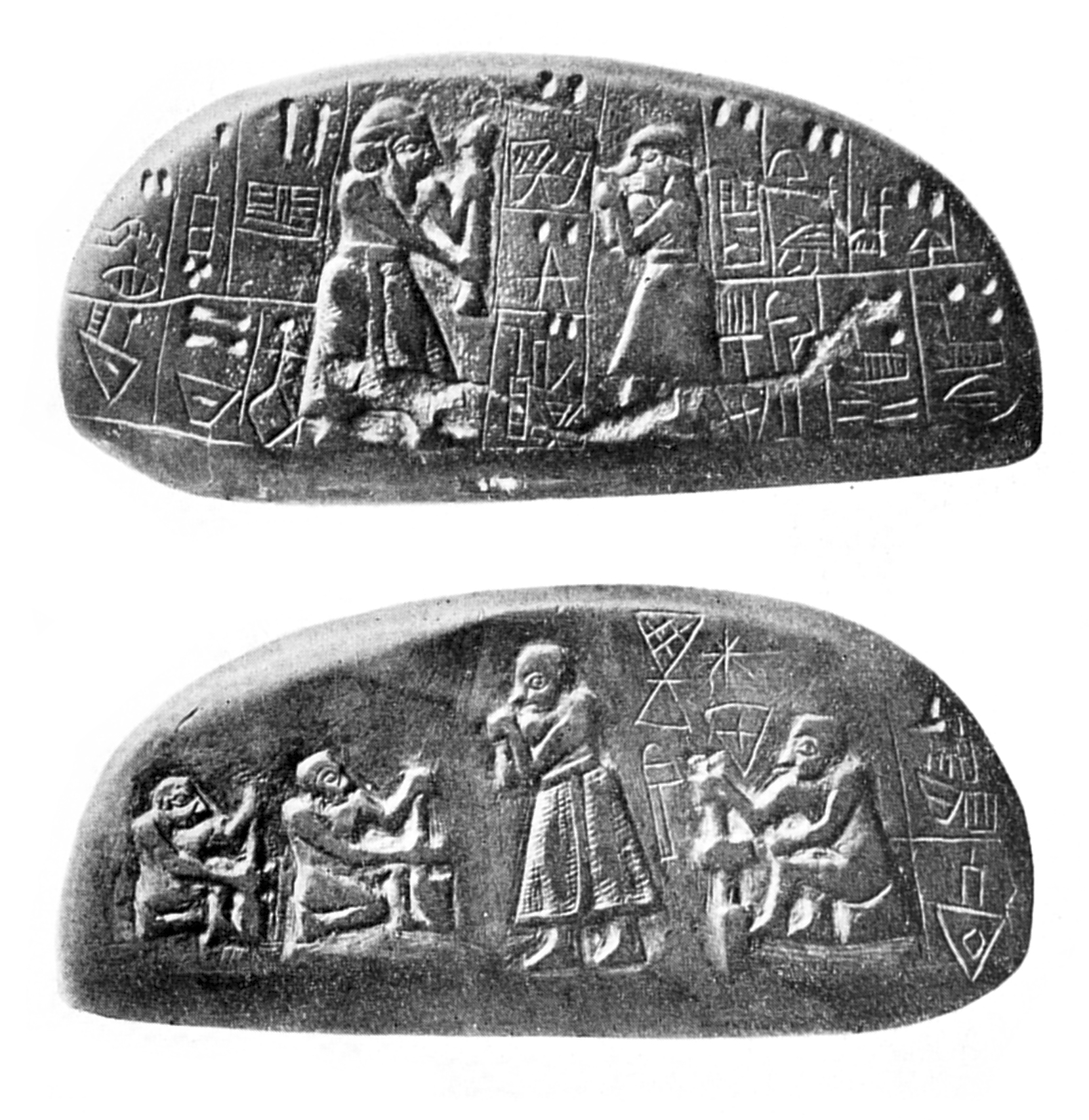
The Blau Monuments combine proto-cuneiform characters and illustrations, 3100–2700 BC. British Museum.

==== Pre-Dynastic dress (4000-2700 BC): kilts and "net-dresses" ====
The earliest type of dress attested in early Sumerian art is not the kaunakes, but rather a sort of kilt or "net dress" which is quite closely fitting the lower body, while the upper body remains bare. This early type of net dress looks much more similar to standard textile then the later kaunakes, which looks more like sheepskin with ample bell-shaped volume around the waist and the legs.

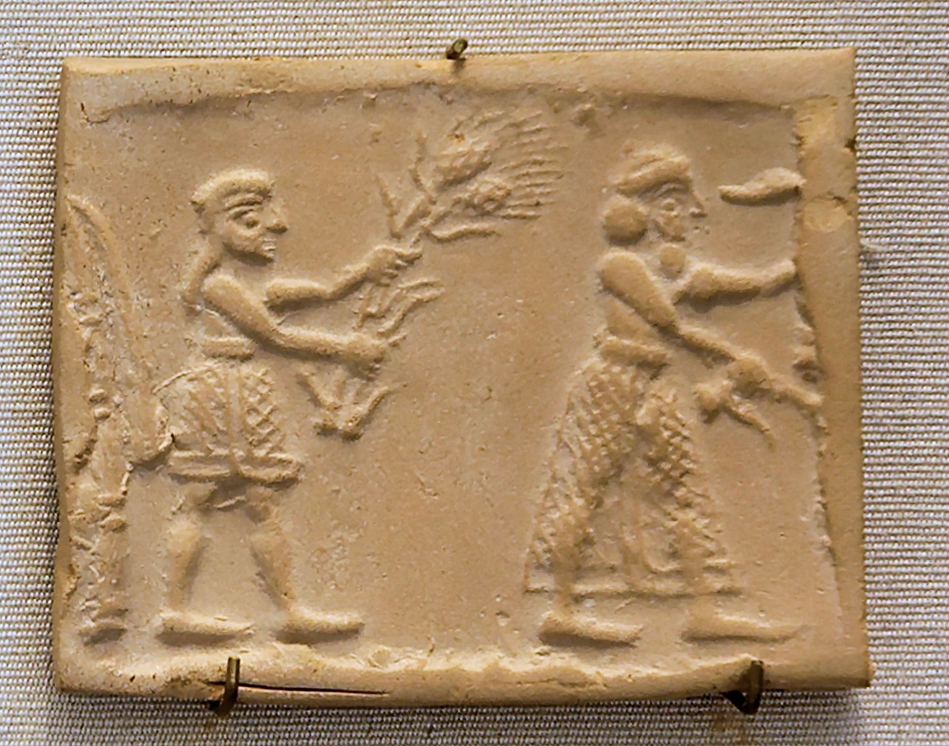
Cylinder seal from Uruk, with "net-dress", 3100 BC

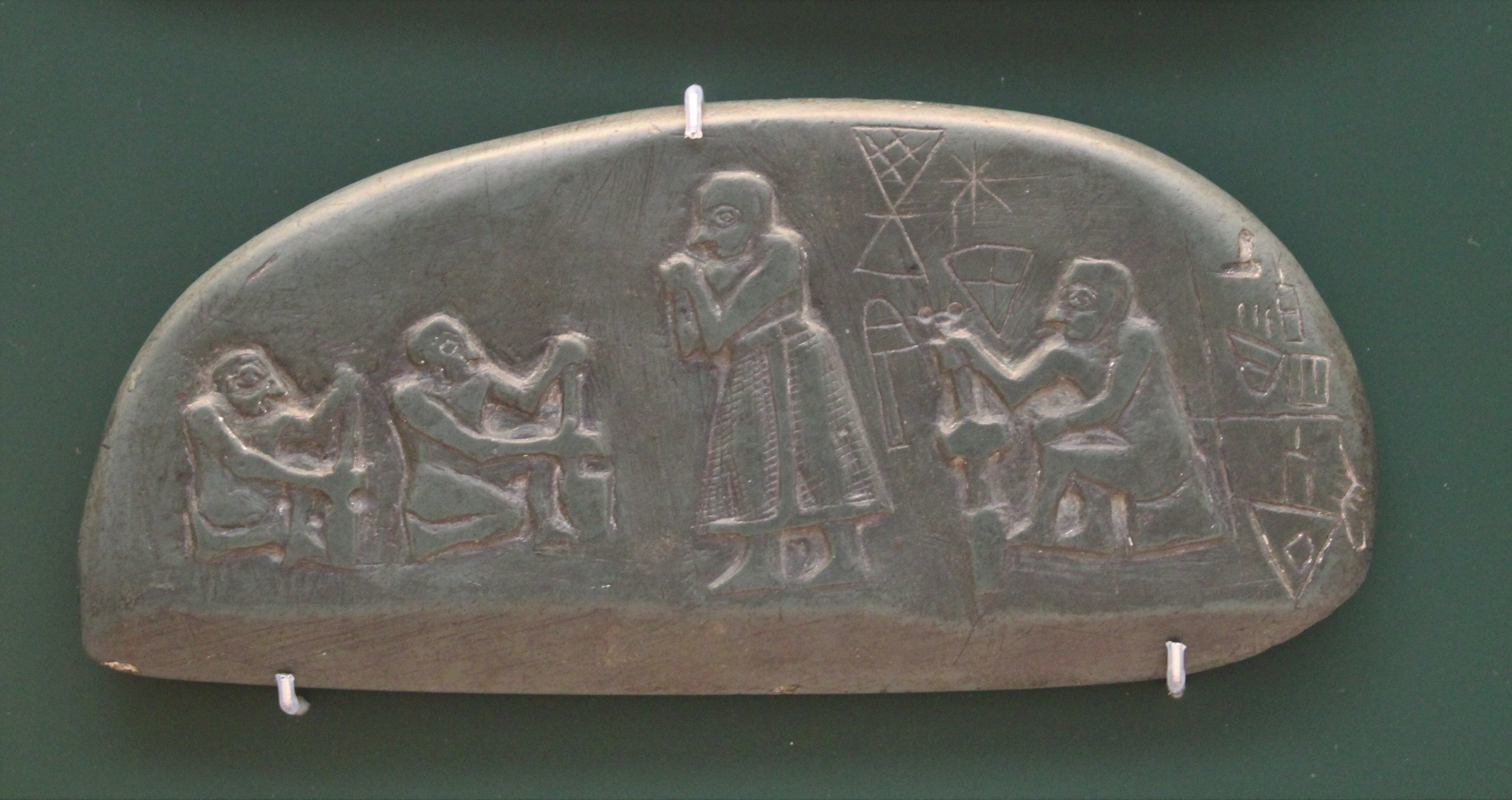
A "net dress" being worn on the Blau Monuments (3000-2900 BC)

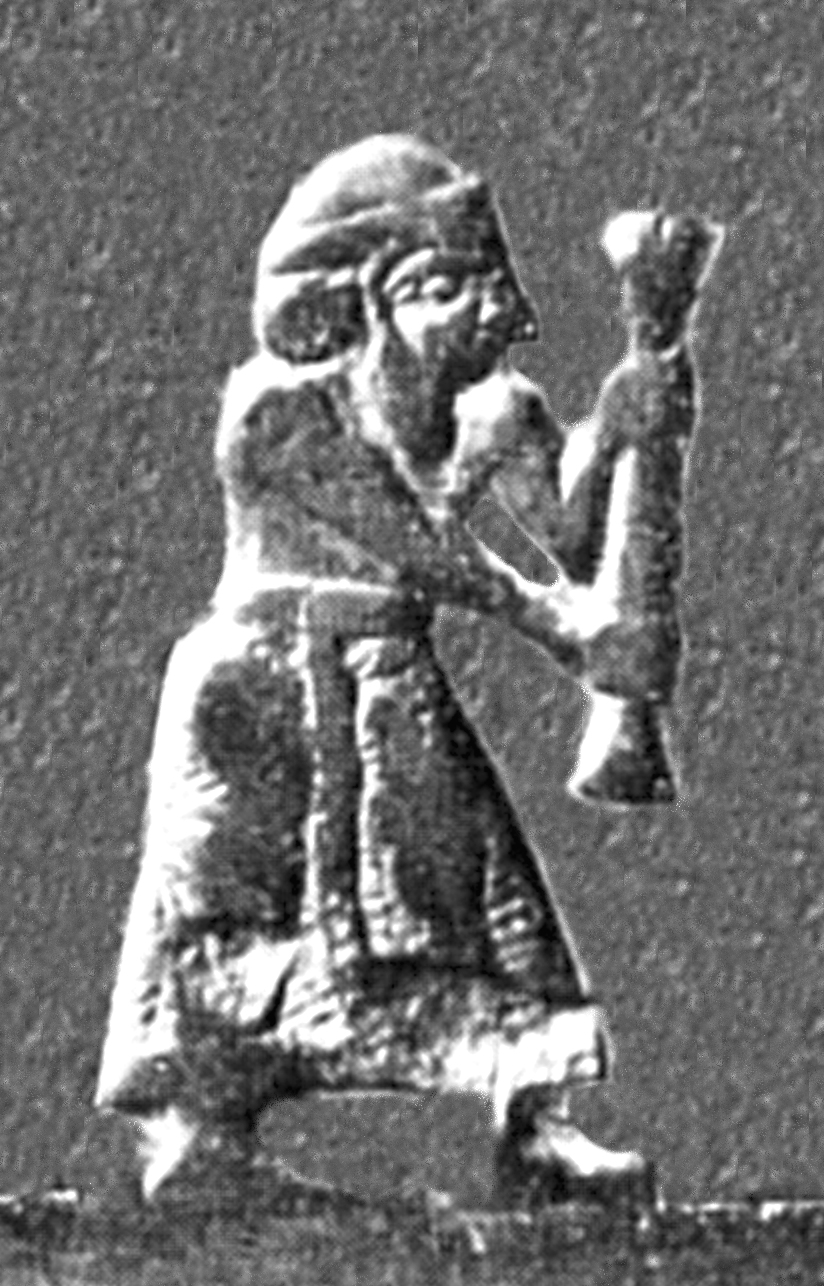
A kilt or "net-dress" on the Blau Monuments (3000-2900 BC)

==== Early Dynastic period (2900–2350 BC) ====
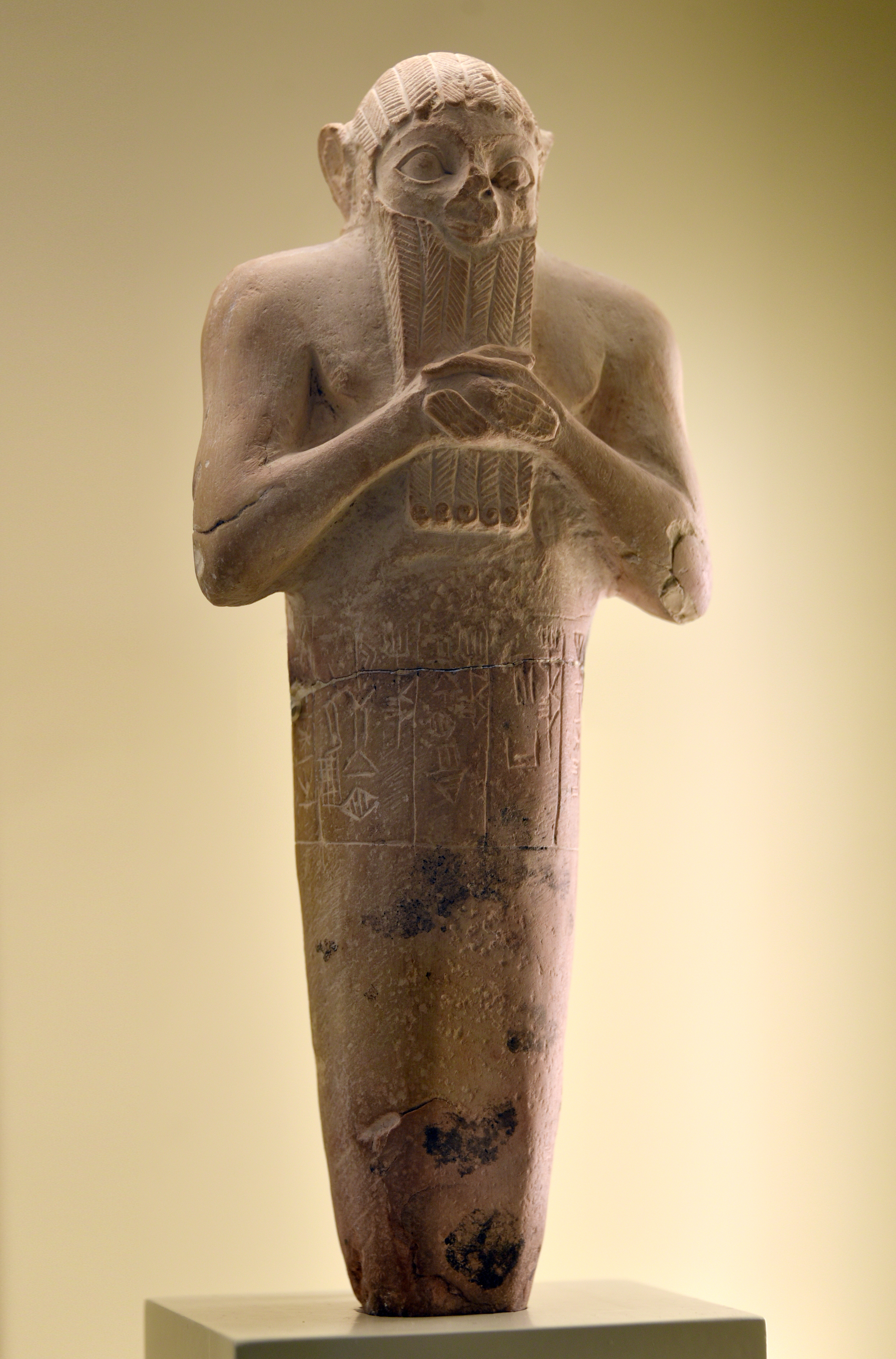
Foundation peg of Lugal-kisal-si, king of Uruk, c. 2380 BC. It reads: "For (goddess) Namma, wife of (the god) An, Lugalkisalsi, King of Uruk, King of Ur, erected this temple of Namma."

The Early Dynastic Period is generally dated to 2900–2350 BC. While continuing many earlier trends, its art is marked by an emphasis on figures of worshippers and priests making offerings, and social scenes of worship, war and court life. Copper becomes a significant medium for sculpture, probably despite most works having later being recycled for their metal. Few if any copper sculptures are as large as the Tell al-'Ubaid Lintel, which is 2.59 metres wide and 1.07 metres high.

Many masterpieces have also been found at the Royal Cemetery at Ur (c. 2650 BC), including the two figures of a Ram in a Thicket, the Copper Bull and a bull's head on one of the Lyres of Ur. The so-called Standard of Ur, actually an inlaid box or set of panels of uncertain function, is finely inlaid with partly figurative designs.

Major Discoveries of the Early Dynastic Period were found through the excavations of Ur that took place between 1922 and 1934. These excavations were led by C. Leonard Woolley in a collaboration between the University of Pennsylvania Museum and the British Museum. Although these excavations ranged across Ur, the Royal Cemetery led to many art discoveries. Sir Woolley notes that a major technical skill of the Sumerians was their development and knowledge of metal work. This element is carried throughout Woolley's discoveries ranging from a cast dagger to one of his most popular discoveries; The twin set of “Rams in a Thicket” residing at The University of Pennsylvania Museum and The British Museum. Through Sir Woolley's discoveries we were able to understand more aspects of Ur than ever before, gaining more knowledge of daily life, architecture, art, government, and religion. This newly found understanding of Mesopotamia culture is found through Sir Woolley’s documentation of his excavations, writing ten volumes of Ur Excavations in 1927 and many more books on his discoveries. These books were physical documentation serving as first hand sources of information on Ur and Mesopotamia, but also allowed for the distribution of his discoveries and widespread of Mesopotamian history.

A group of 12 temple statues known as the Tell Asmar Hoard, now split up, show gods, priests and donor worshippers at different sizes, but all in the same highly simplified style. All have greatly enlarged inlaid eyes, but the tallest figure, the main cult image depicting the local god, has enormous eyes that give it a "fierce power". Later in the period this geometric style was replaced by a strongly contrasting one giving "a detailed rendering of the physical peculiarities of the subject"; "Instead of sharply contrasting, clearly articulated masses, we see fluid transitions and infinitely modulated surfaces".

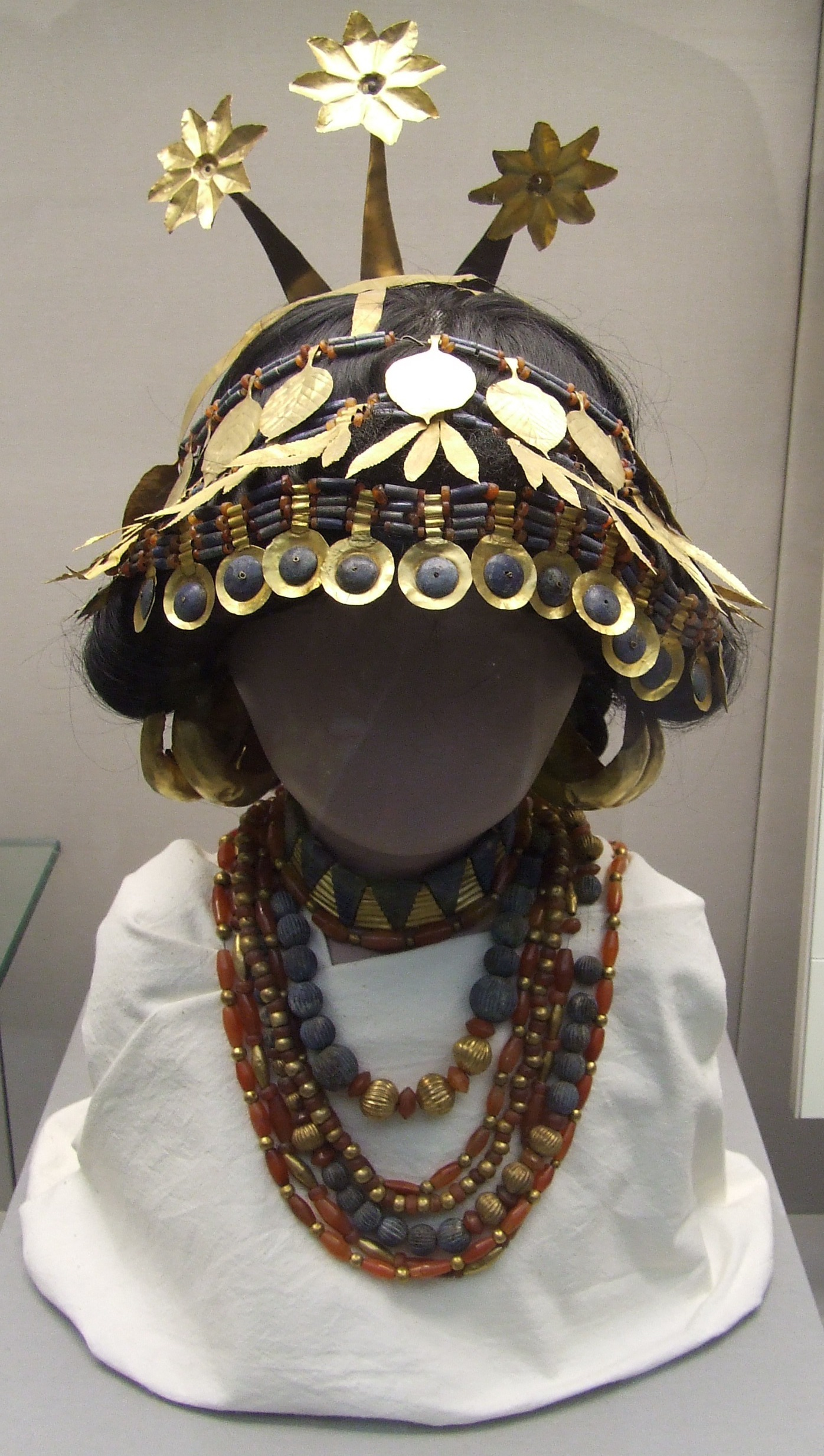
Sumerian headgear necklaces. British museum.

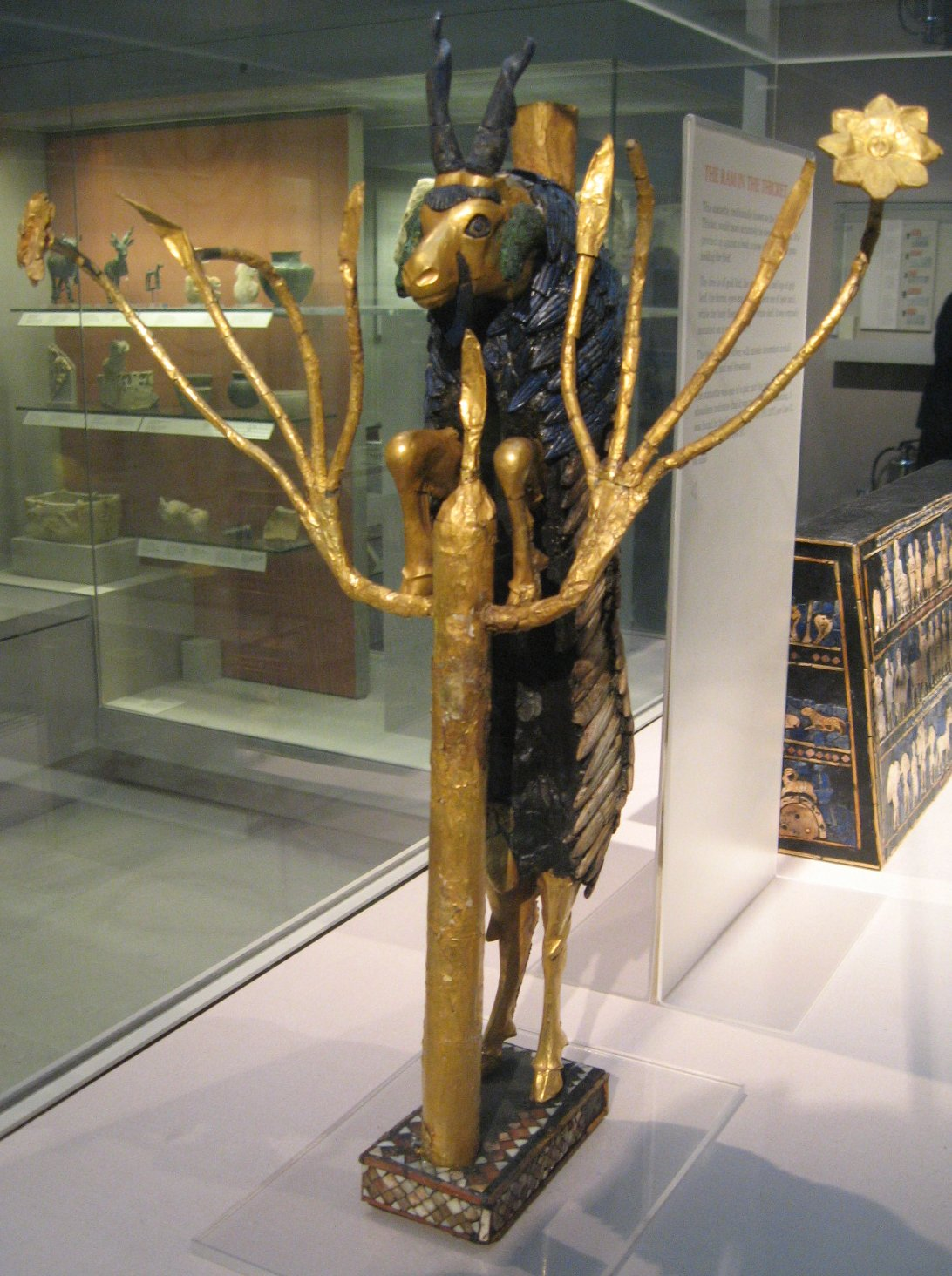
Ram in a Thicket; 2600–2400 BC; gold, copper, shell, lapis lazuli and limestone; height: 45.7 cm; from the Royal Cemetery at Ur; British Museum

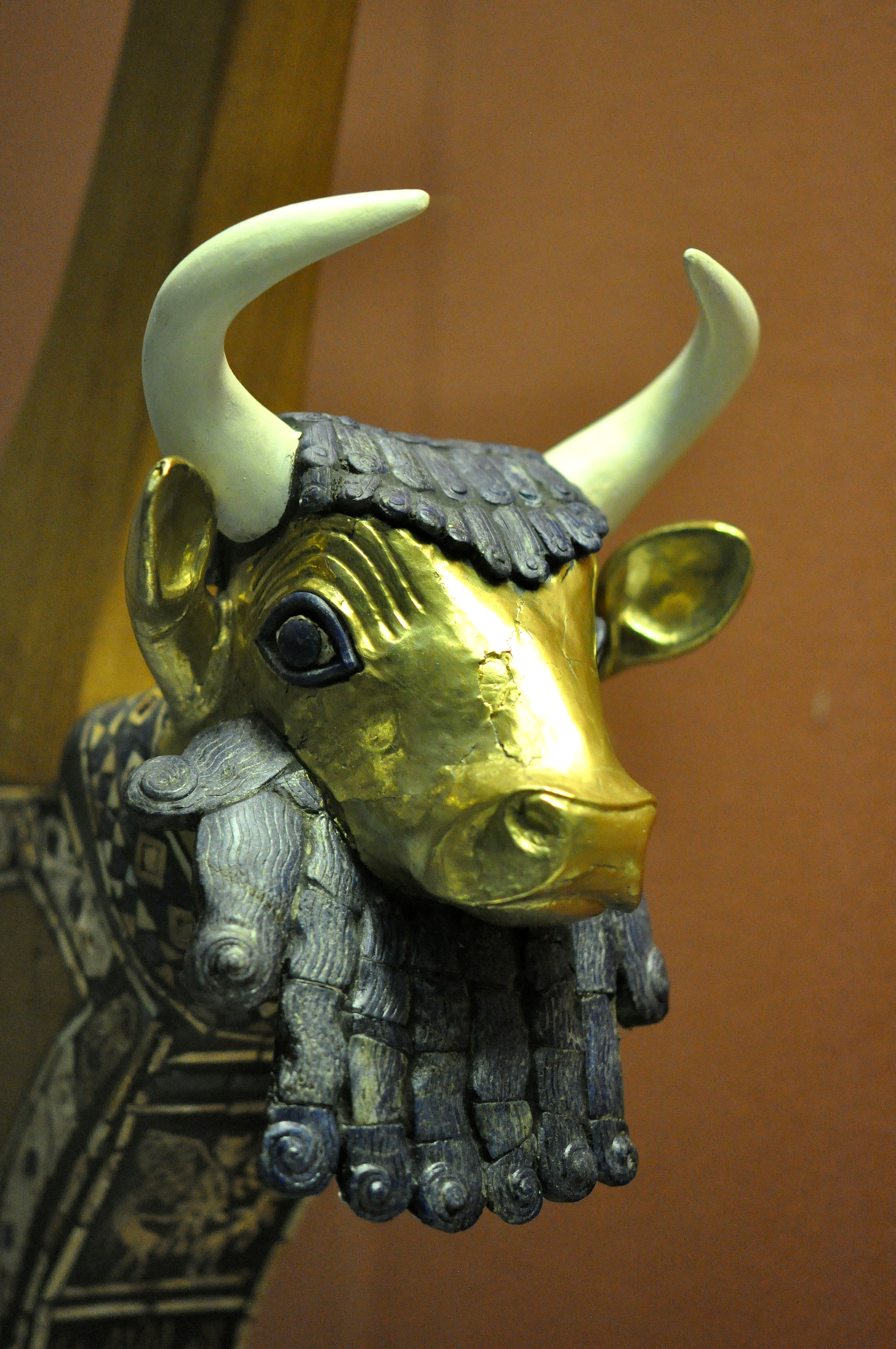
Bull's head from the Queen's Lyre from Pu-abi's grave, Ur, c. 2600 BC

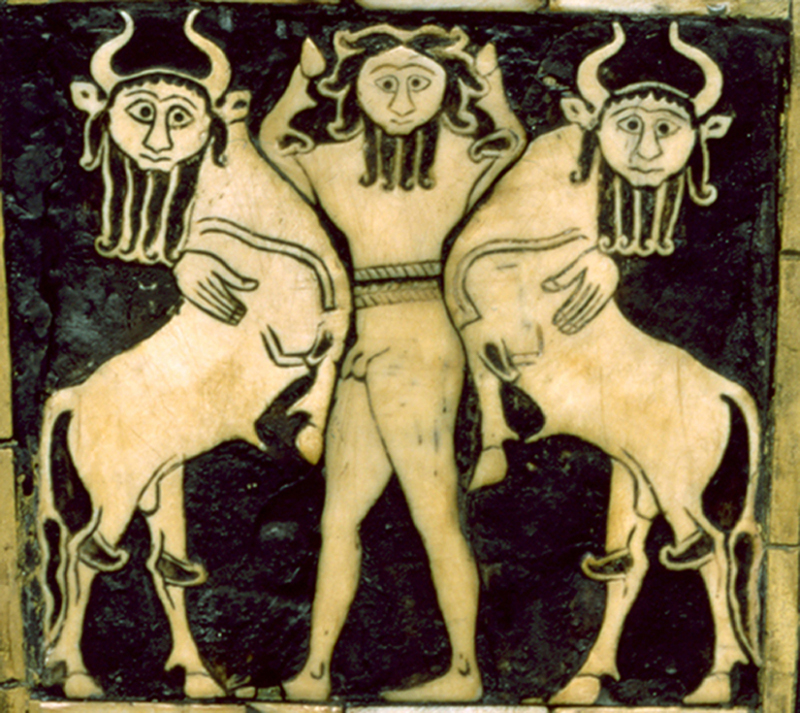
Master of animals motif in a panel of the soundboard of the Ur harp

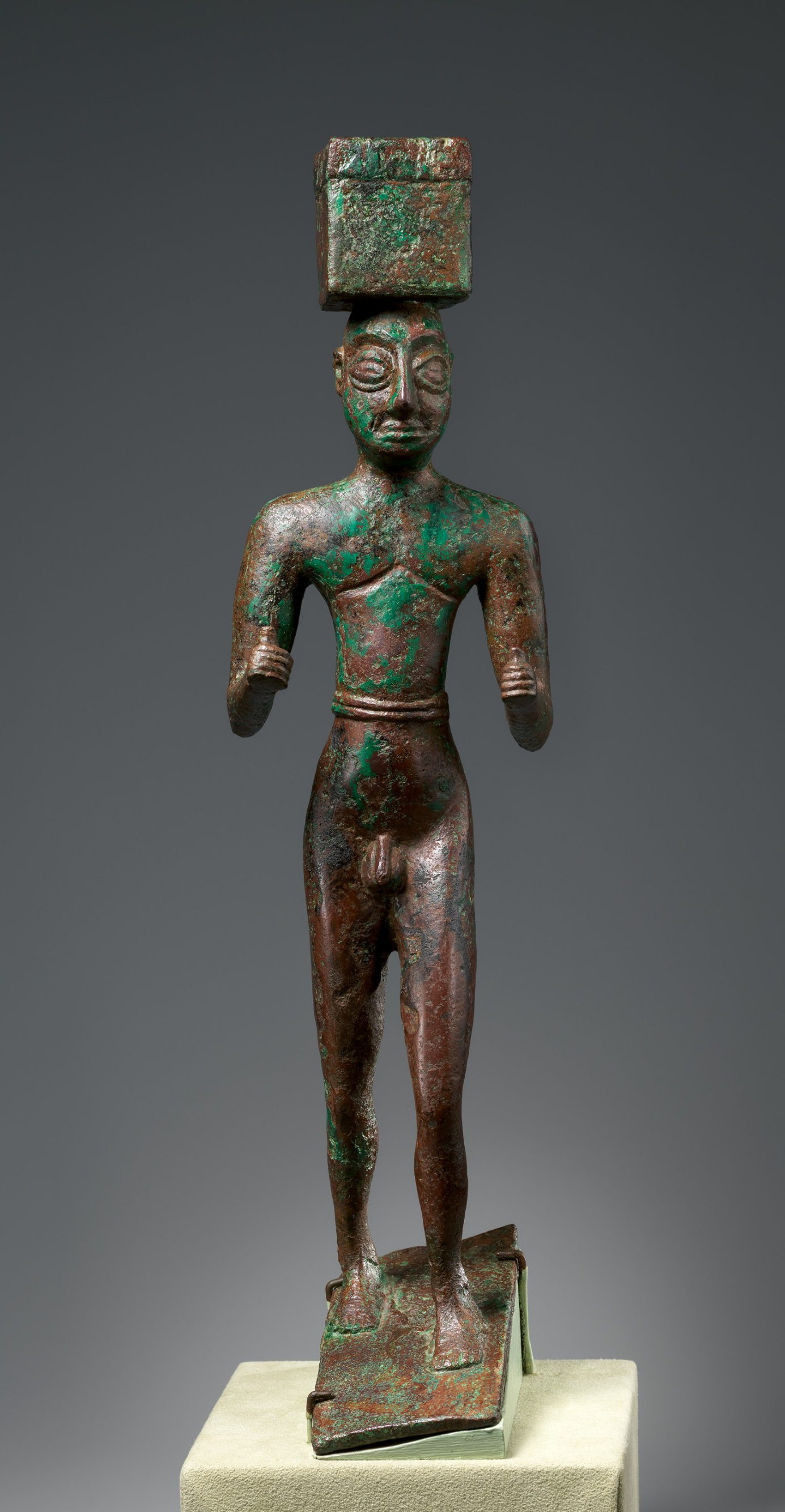
Man carrying a box, possibly for offerings. Metalwork, ca. 2900–2600 BC, Sumer. Metropolitan Museum of Art.

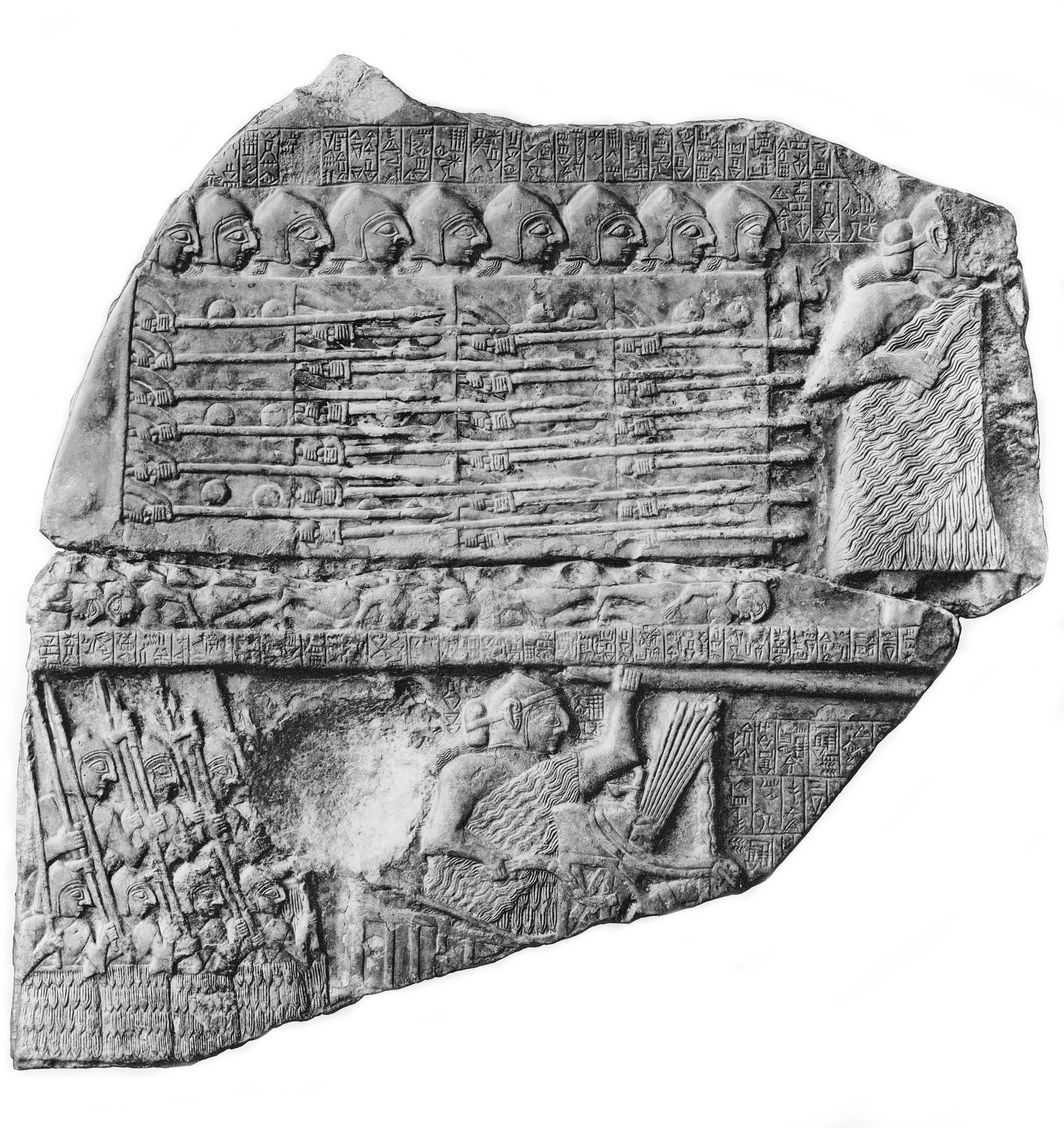
Battle scene, with phalanx led by King Eannatum, on the Stele of the Vultures, Early Dynastic III period, 2600–2350 BC

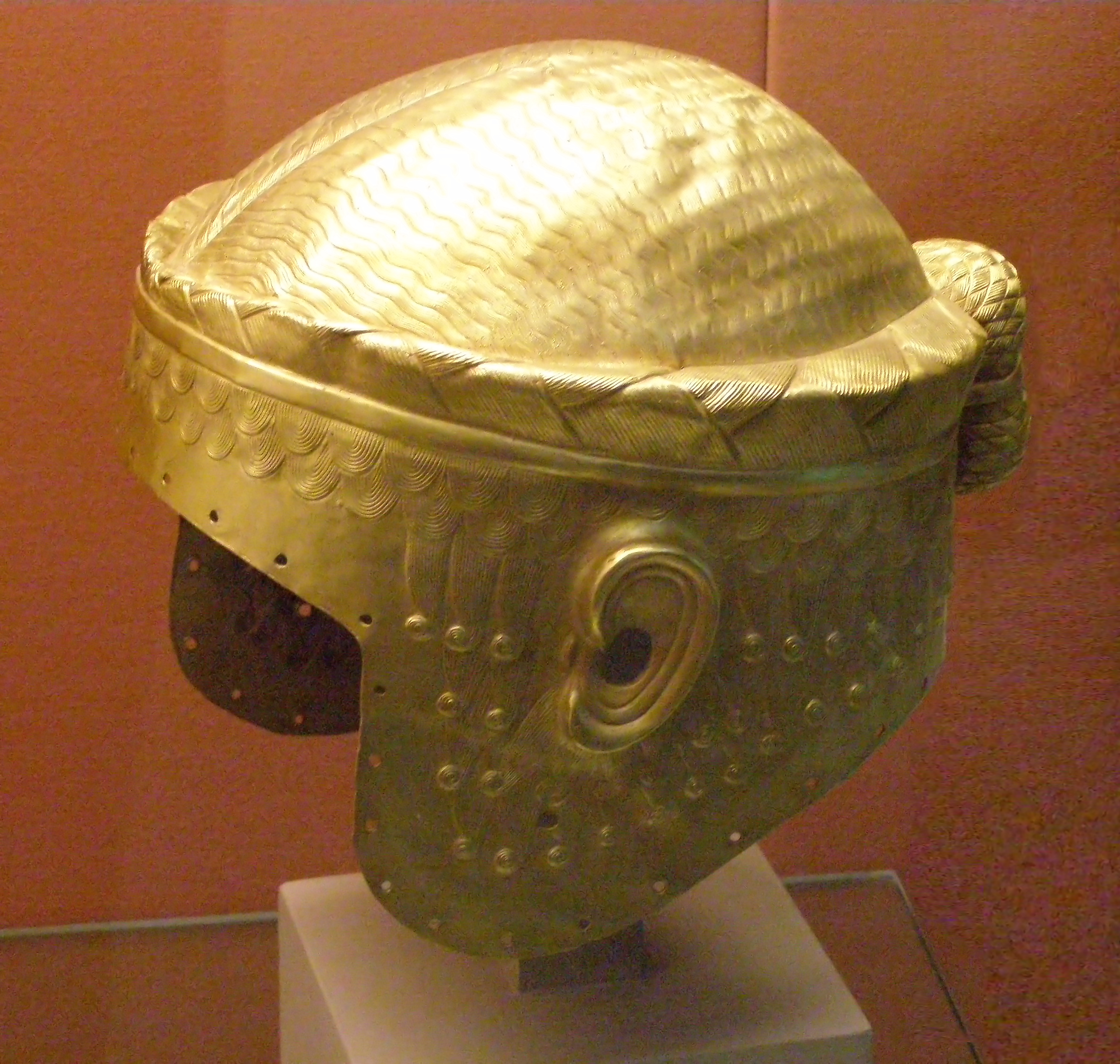
Gold helmet of Meskalamdug, ruler of the First Dynasty of Ur, circa 2500 BC, Early Dynastic period III.

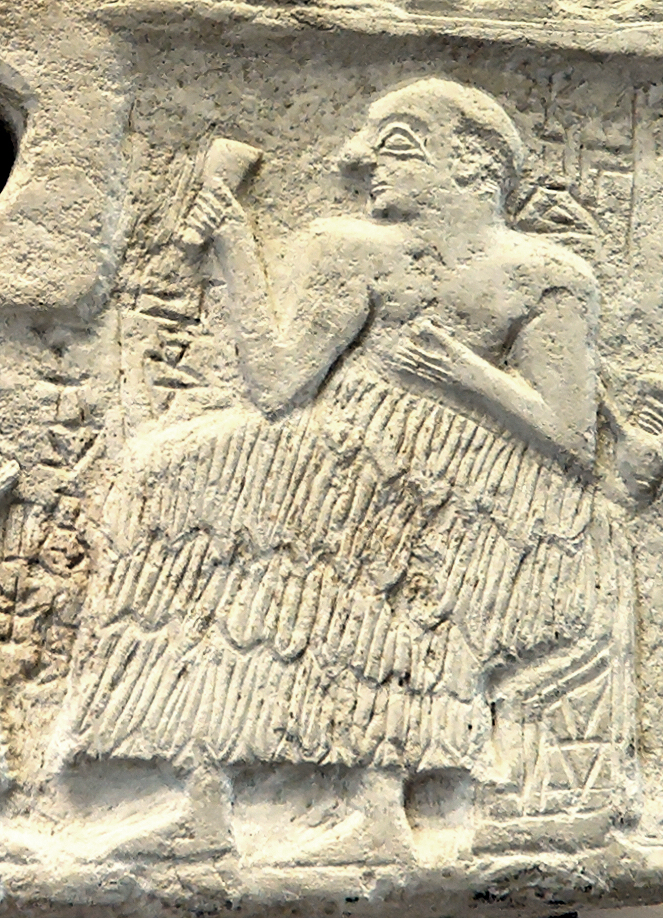
King Ur-Nanshe, seated, wearing flounced skirt. Limestone, Early Dynastic III (2550–2500 BC). Found in Telloh (ancient city of Girsu). Louvre Museum.

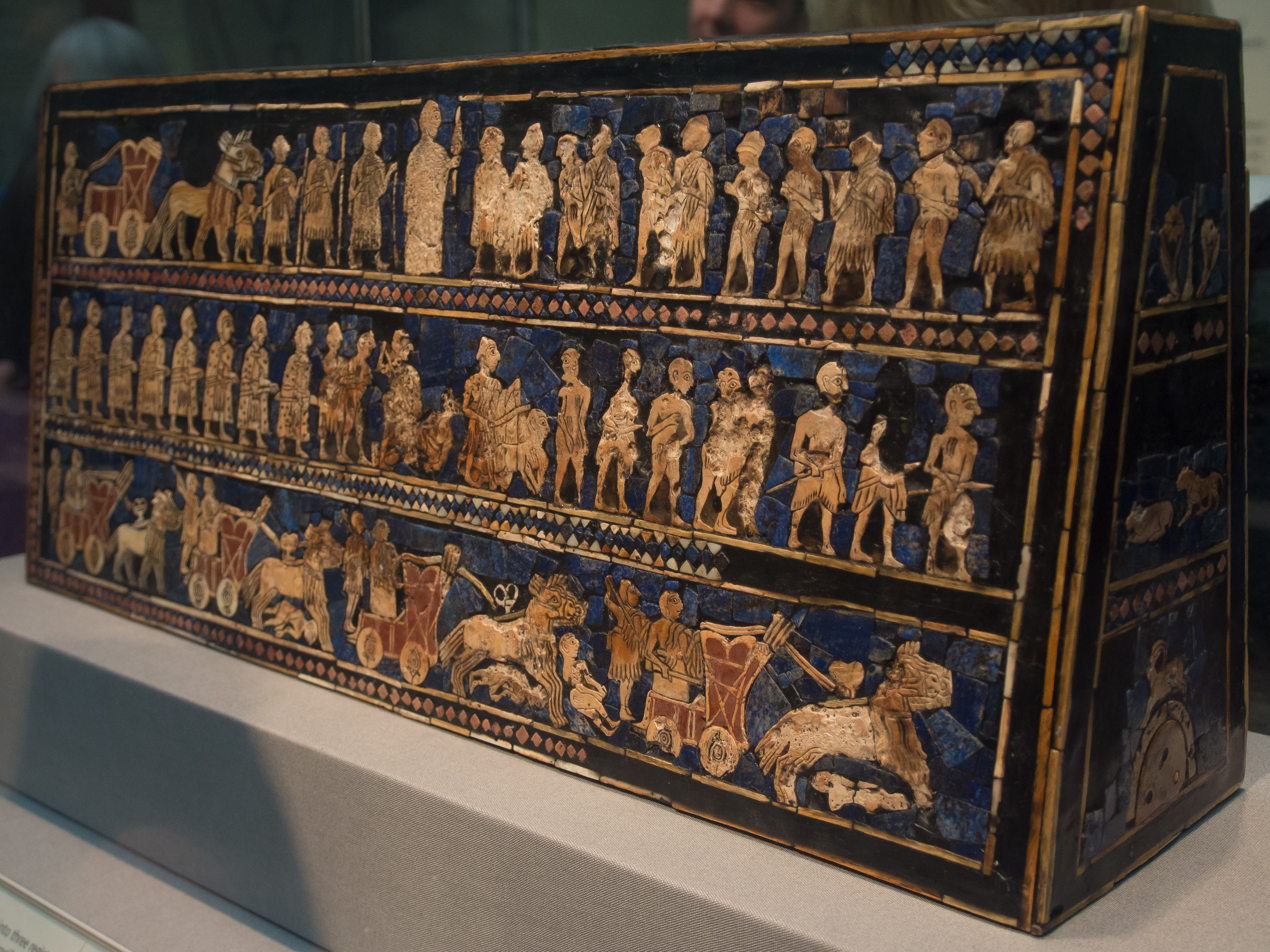
Standard of Ur; 2600–2400 BC; shell, red limestone and lapis lazuli on wood; length: 49.5 cm; from the Royal Cemetery at Ur; British Museum

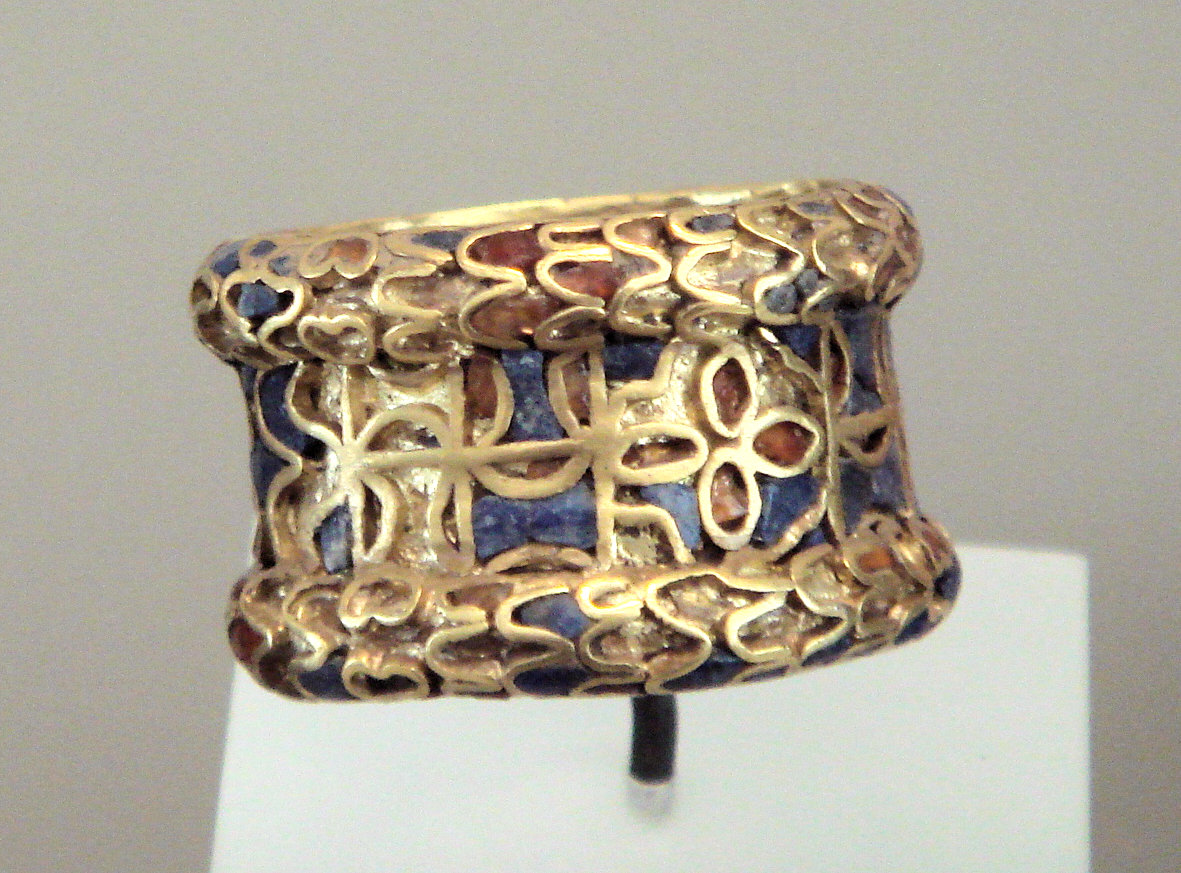
Ring of Gold, Carnelian, Lapis Lazuli, Tello, ancient Girsu, mid-3rd millennium BC.

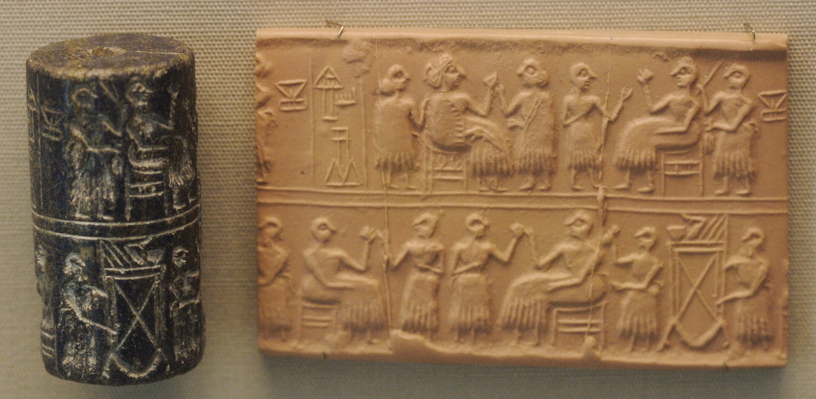
Cylinder-seal of the "lady" or "queen" Puabi, Royal Cemetery at Ur, c. 2600 BC; British Museum

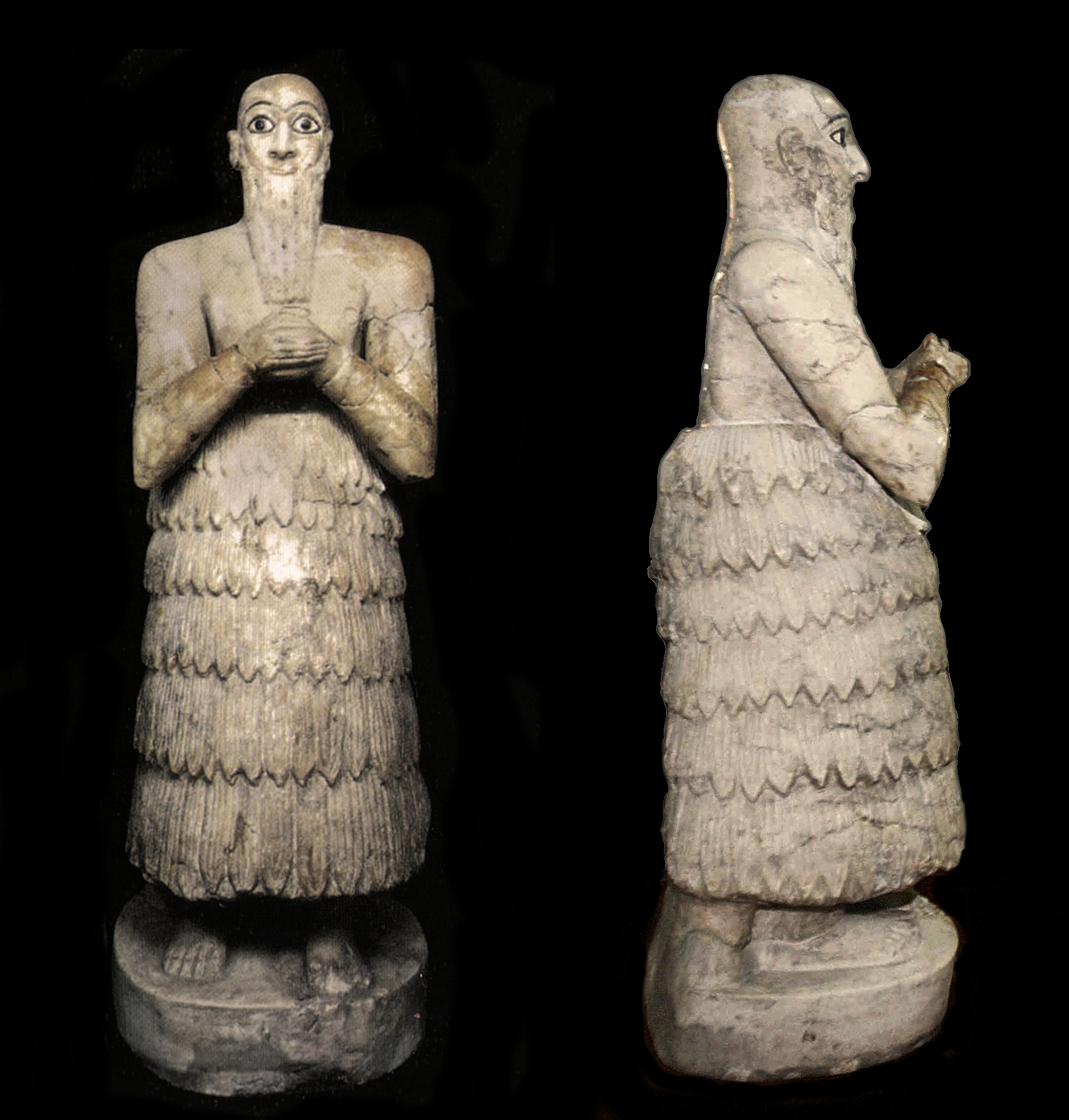
Statue of Iku-Shamagan king of Mari, c.2500 BC. National Museum of Damascus

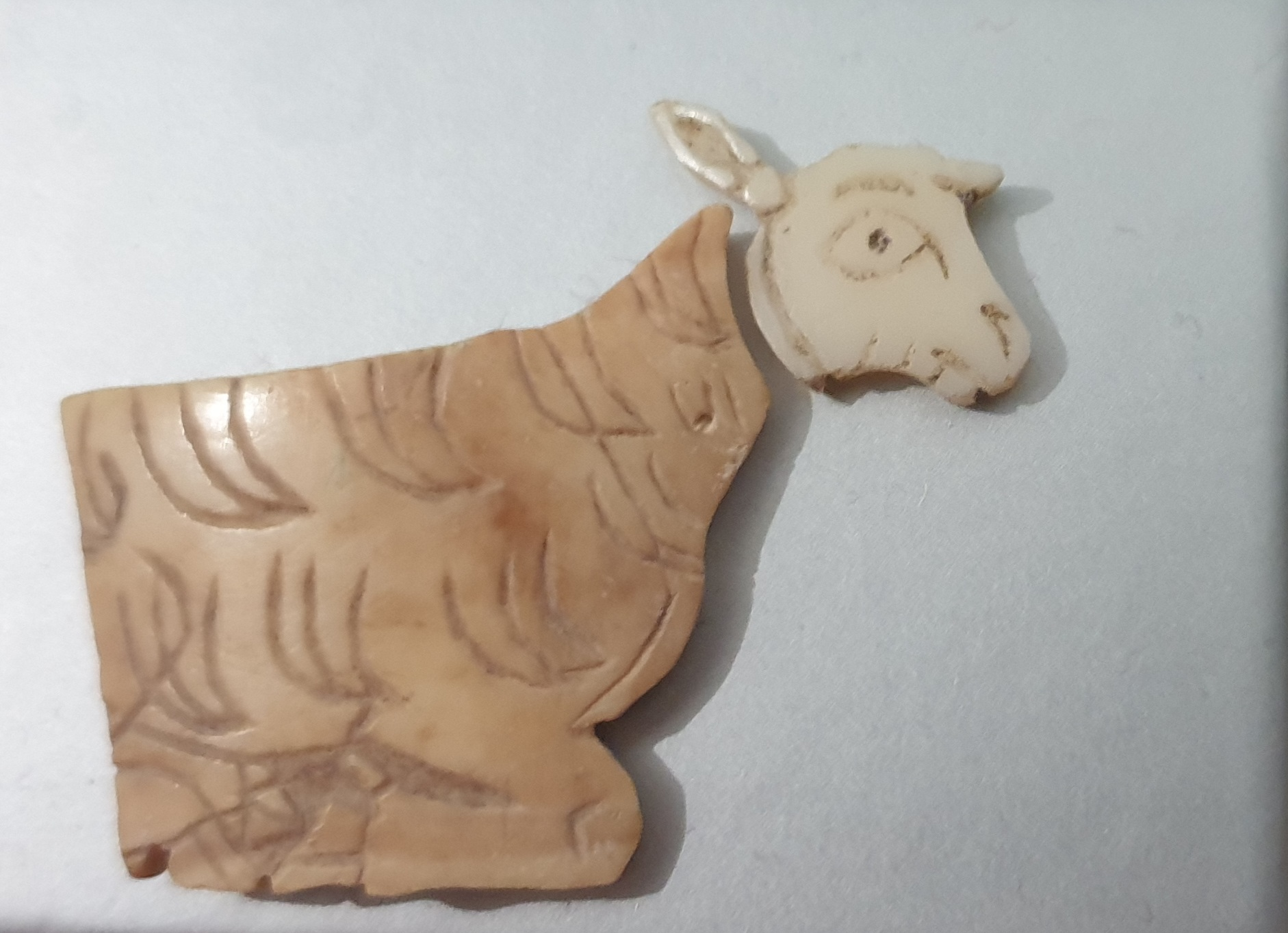
A Sumerian group of two separate shell inlay fragments forming the body and head of a sheep. Circa 27th - 24th Century BC. From a Mayfair gallery, London, UK.

=== Akkadian Empire period (c. 2334–2154 BC) ===
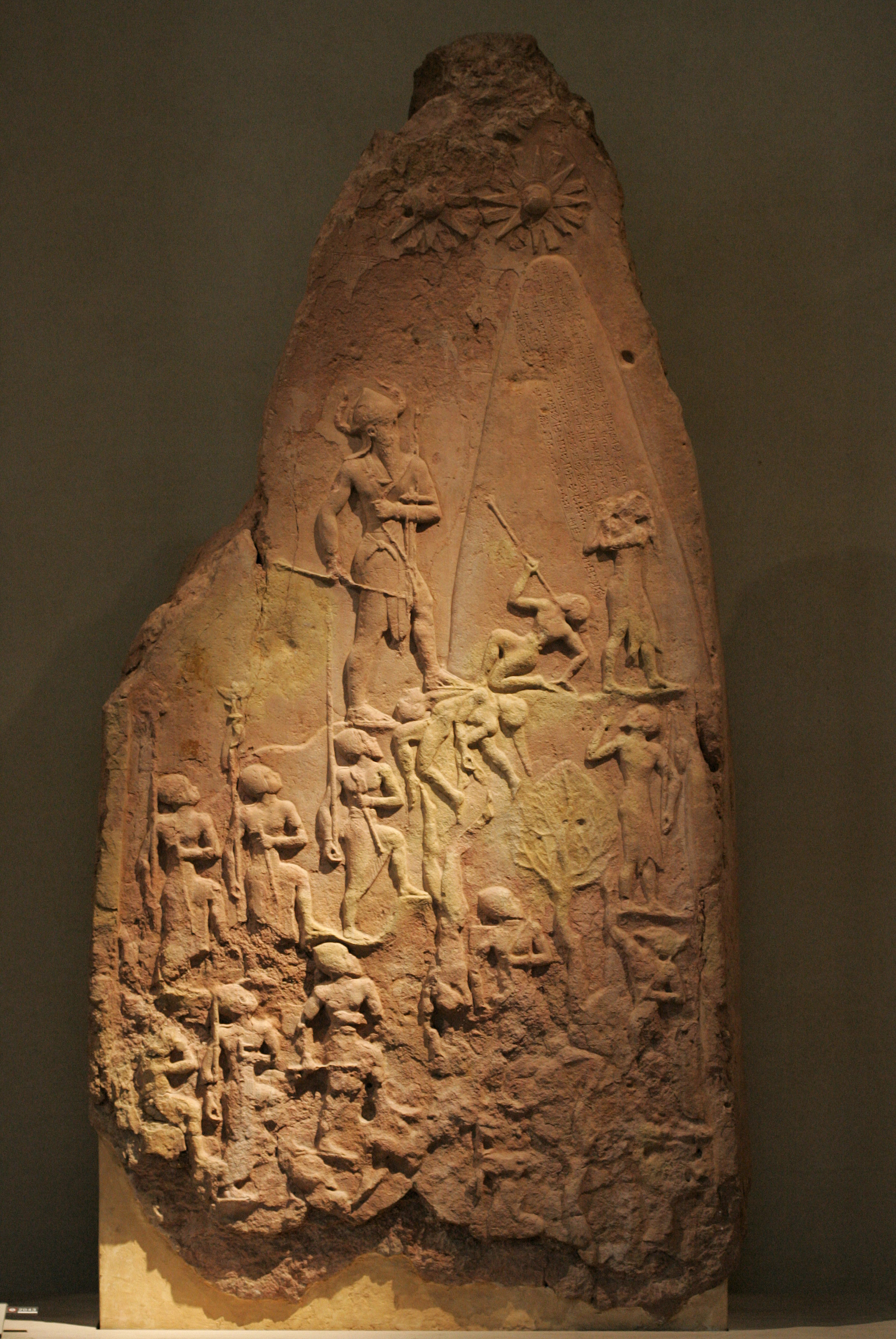
Victory Stele of Naram-Sin; 2255–2220 BC; reddish sandstone with yellow patches (signs of having been burnt?); height: 200 cm, width: 150 cm; Louvre

The Akkadian Empire was the first to control not only all Mesopotamia, but other territories in the Levant, from about 2334 to 2154 BC. The Akkadians were not Sumerian, and spoke a Semitic language. In art there was a great emphasis on the kings of the dynasty, alongside much that continued earlier Sumerian art. In large works and small ones such as seals, the degree of realism was considerably increased, but the seals show a "grim world of cruel conflict, of danger and uncertainty, a world in which man is subjected without appeal to the incomprehensible acts of distant and fearful divinities who he must serve but cannot love. This sombre mood ... remained characteristic of Mesopotamian art..."

King Naram-Sin's famous Victory Stele depicts him as a god-king (symbolized by his horned headdress, typically reserved for deities) climbing a mountain above his soldiers, and his enemies, the defeated Lullubi. Although the stele was broken off at the top when it was stolen and carried off by the Elamite forces of Shutruk-Nakhunte, it still strikingly reveals the pride, glory, and divinity of Naram-Sin. The stele seems to break from tradition by using successive diagonal tiers to communicate the story to viewers; however, the more traditional horizontal frames are visible on smaller broken pieces. It is 6 feet 7 inches (2.01 m) tall, and made from pink sandstone. From the same reign, the bare legs and lower torso of the copper Bassetki Statue show an unprecedented level of realism, as does the imposing bronze head of a bearded ruler (Louvre).

The Louvre head is a life-size, bronze bust found in Nineveh. The intricate curling and patterning of the beard and the complex hairstyle suggests royalty, power, and wealth from an ideal male in society. Aside from its aesthetic traits, this piece is spectacular because it is the earliest hollow-cast sculpture item known to use the lost-wax casting process. There is deliberate damage on the left side of the face and eye, indicating that the bust was intentionally slashed at a later period to demonstrate political iconoclasm.

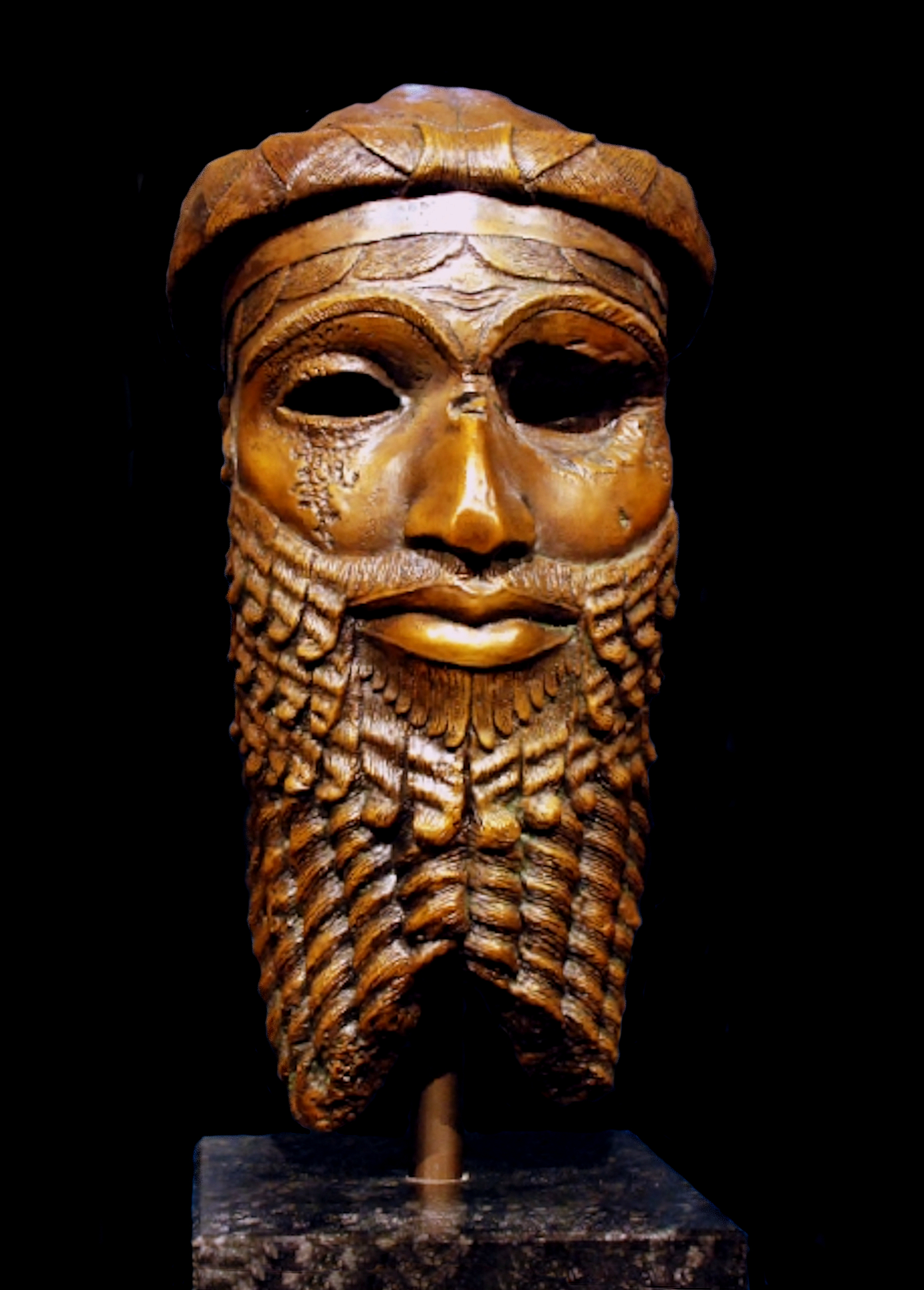
Bronze head of an Akkadian ruler, discovered in Nineveh in 1931, presumably depicting either Sargon of Akkad or Sargon's grandson Naram-Sin.

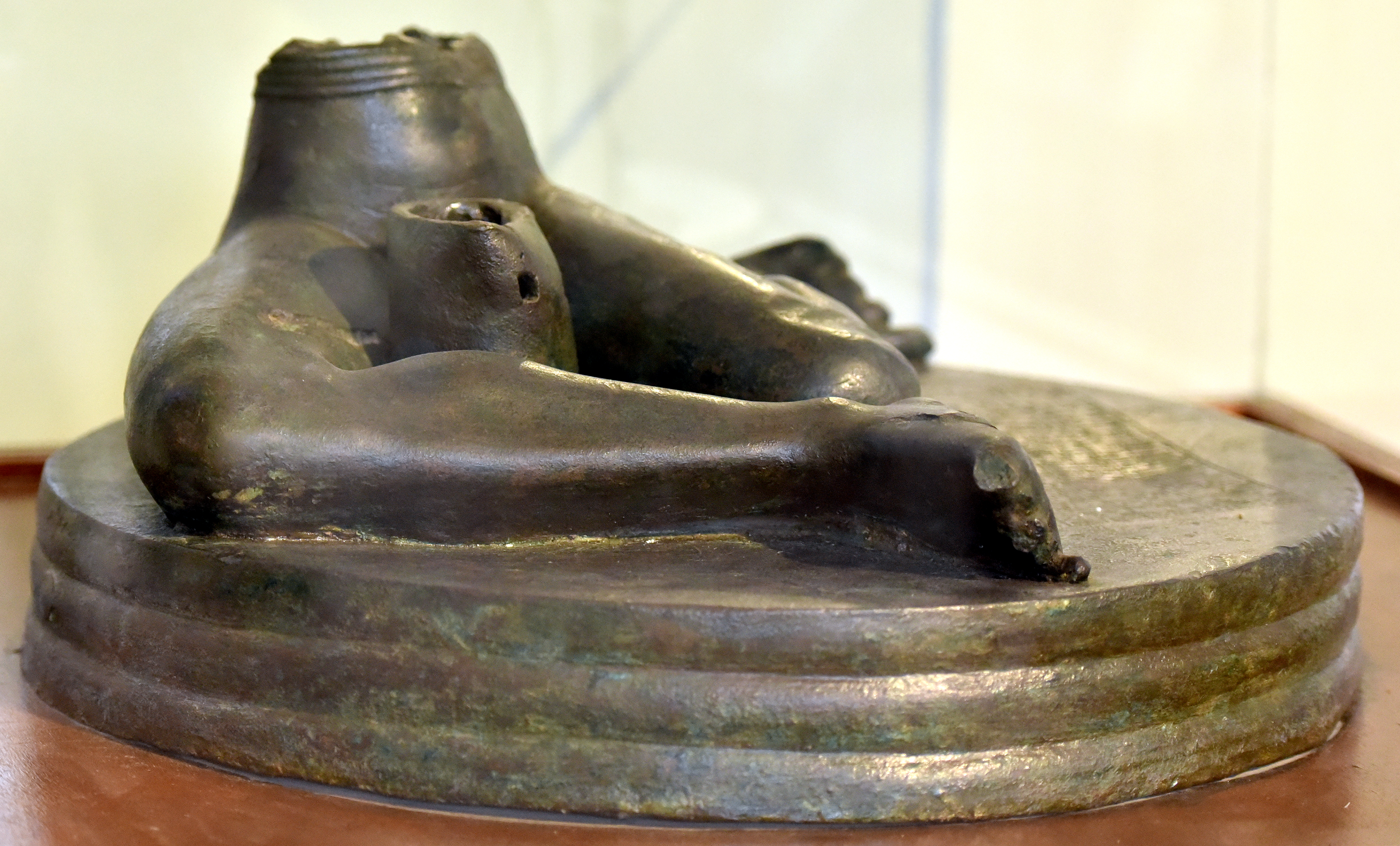
The copper Bassetki Statue

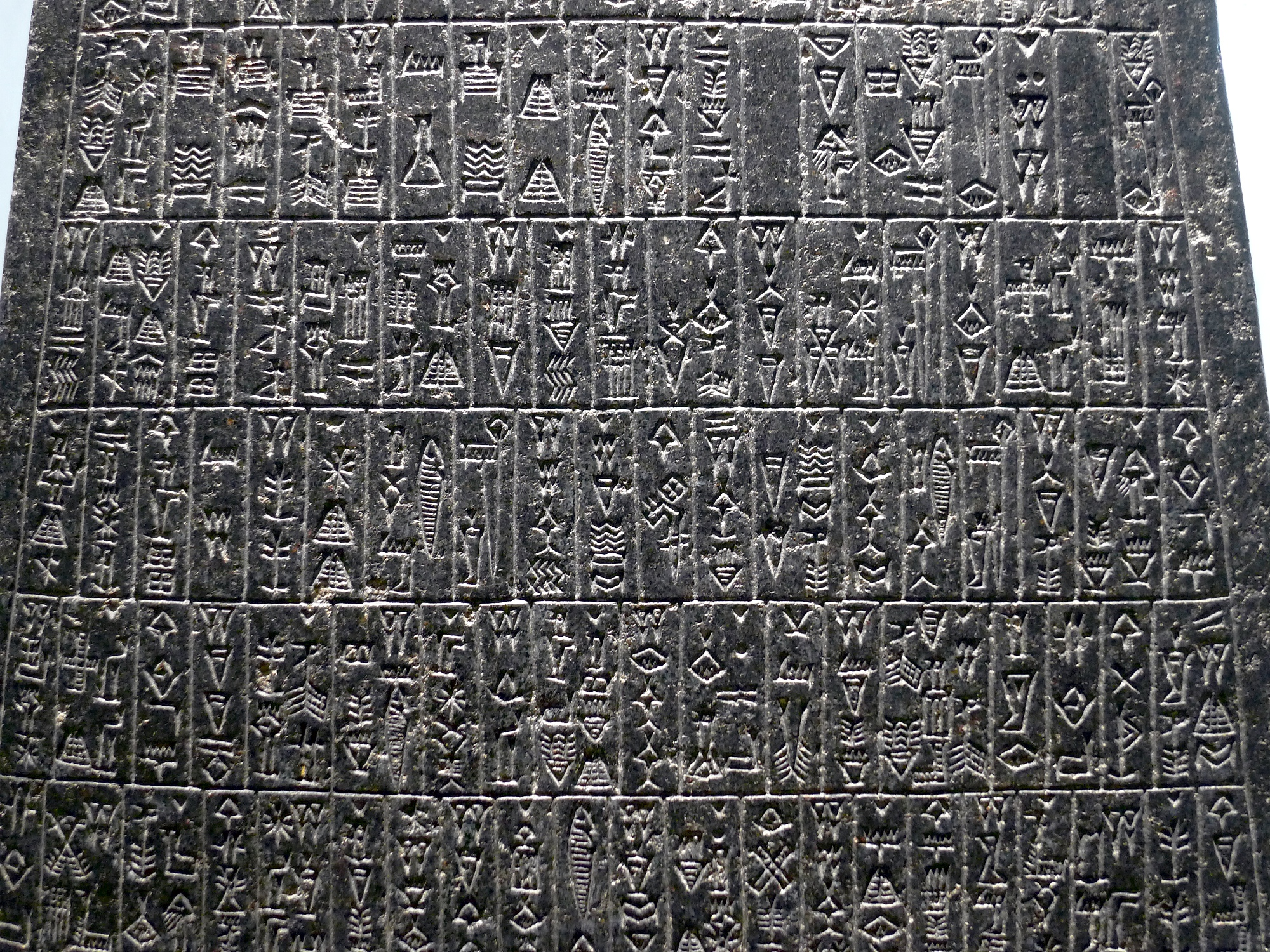
Akkadian language inscription on the obelisk of Manishtushu

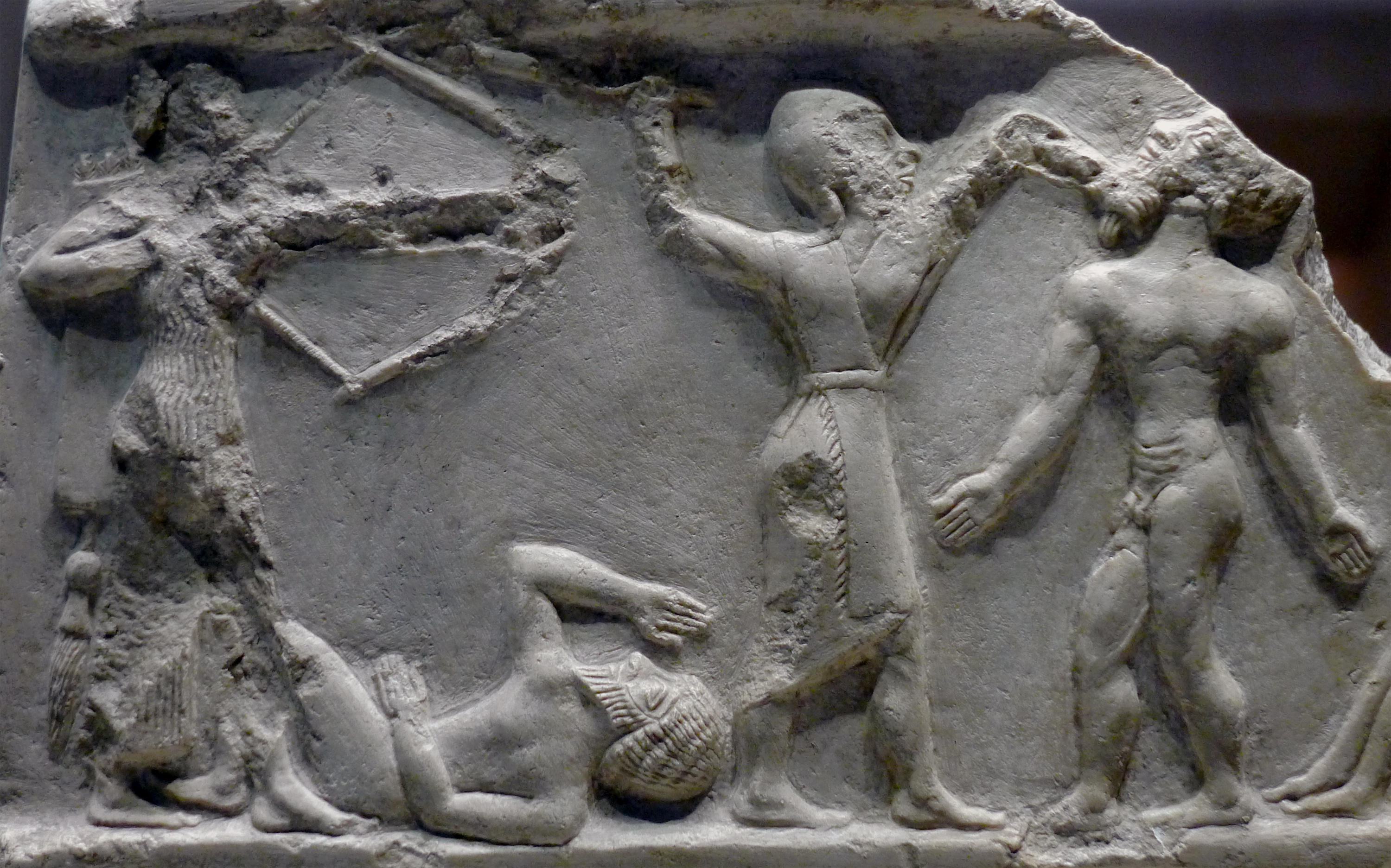
Detail of a victory stele of Akkadian king Rimush

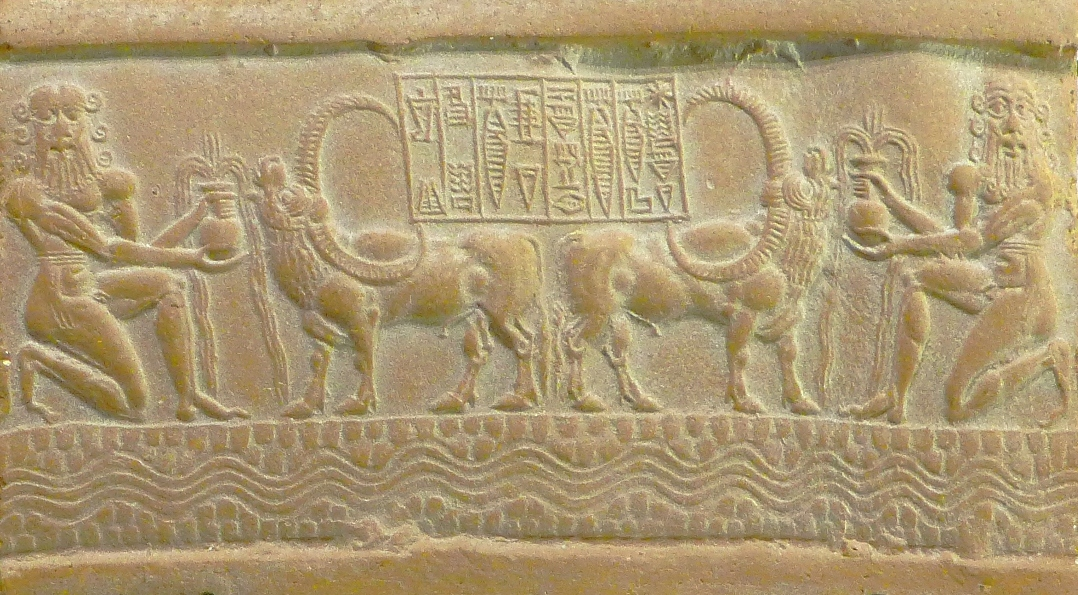
Seal impression with gods and water buffaloes, thought to have been imported from the Indus Valley civilization, an example of Indus-Mesopotamia relations at the time.

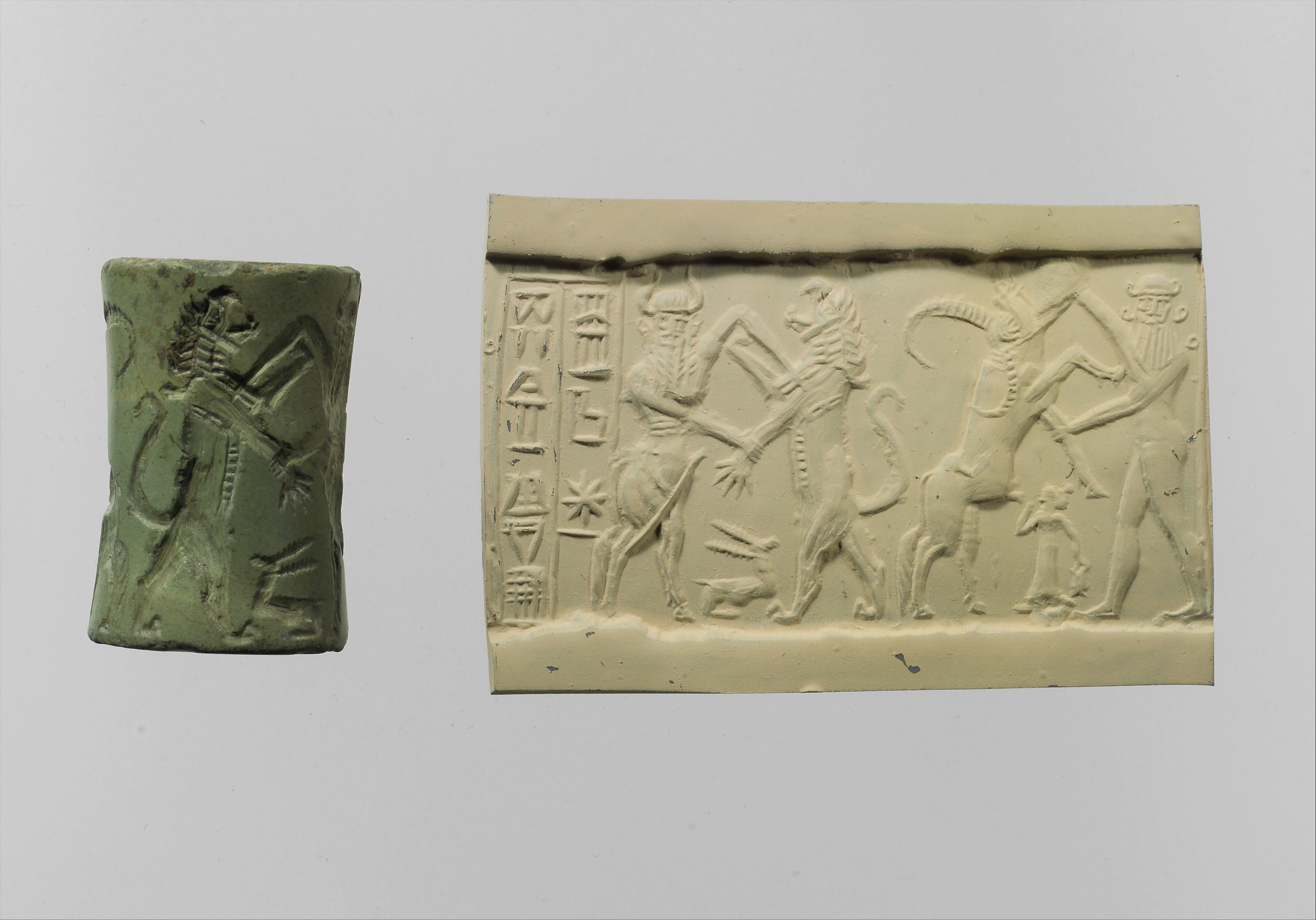
Cylinder seal and modern impression – bull-man combatting lion; nude hero combatting water buffalo; 2250–2150 BC; albite; height: 3.4 cm, diameter: 2.3 cm; Metropolitan Museum of Art (New York City)

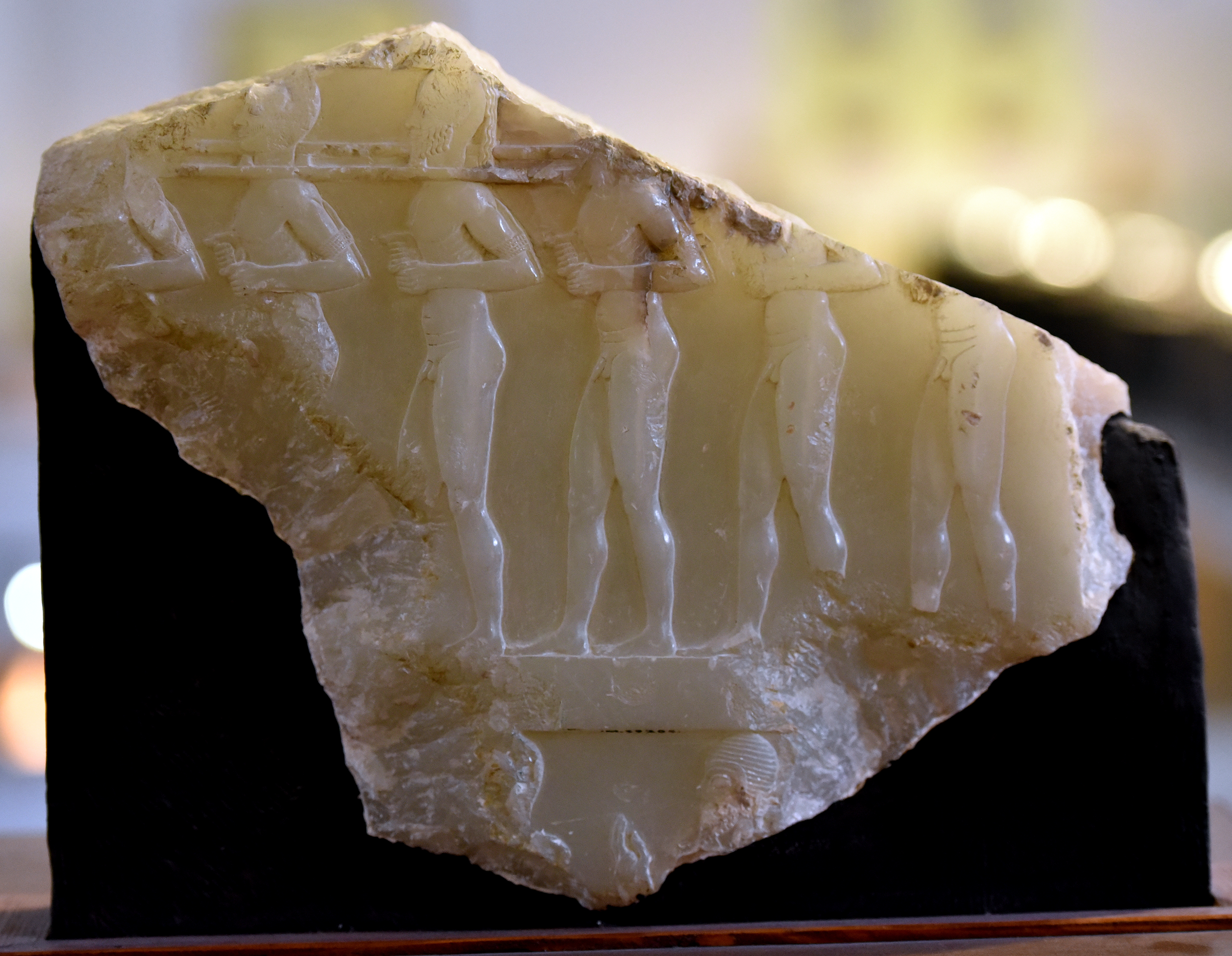
Naked captives, on the Nasiriyah stele of Naram-Sin.

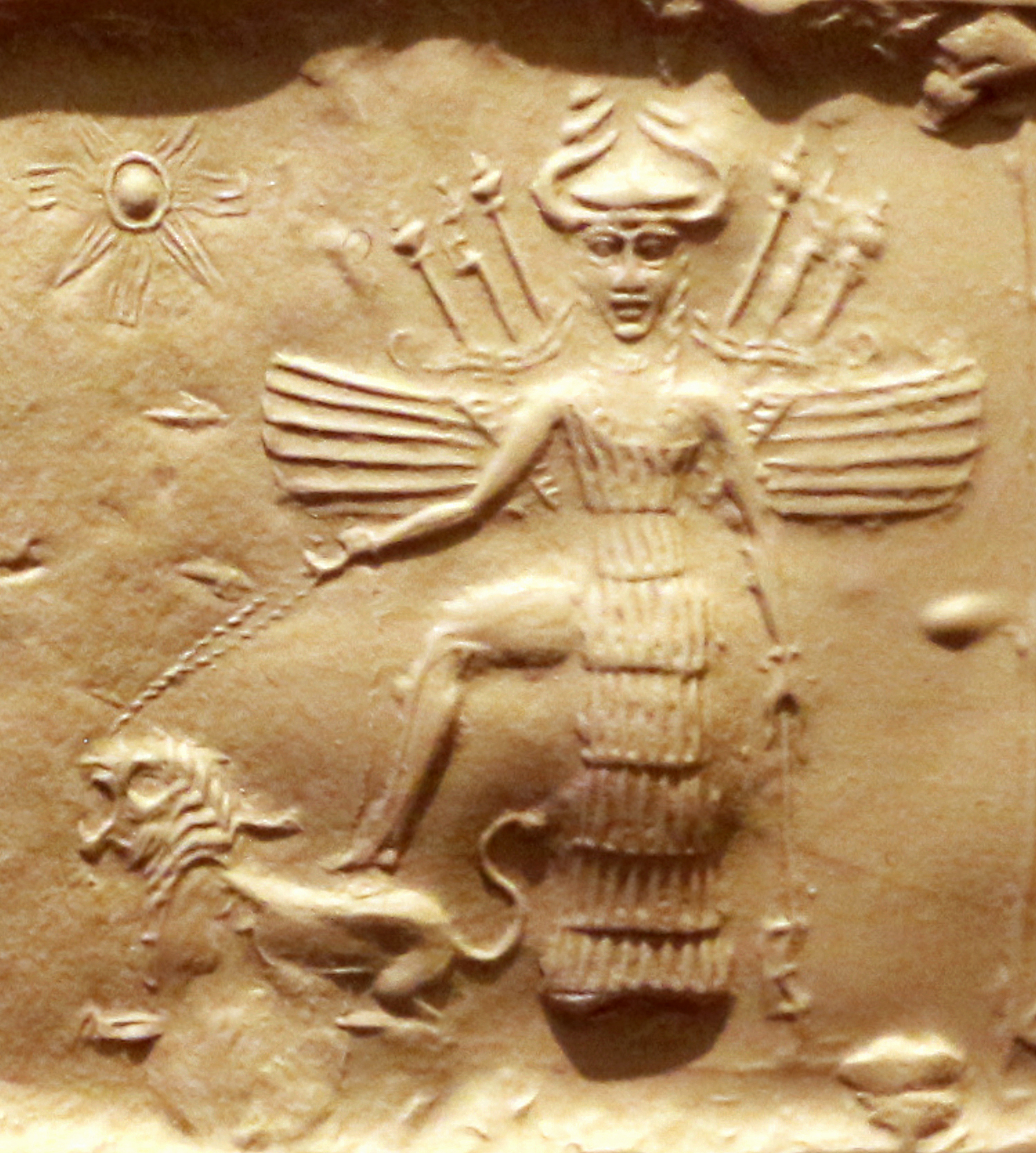
Goddess Ishtar on an Akkadian Empire seal, 2350–2150 BC. She is equipped with weapons in her back, has a horned helmet, and is trampling a lion.

=== Neo-Sumerian period (c. 2112–2004 BC) ===
After the fall of the Akkadian Empire, a local dynasty emerged in Lagash. Gudea, ruler of Lagash (reign ca. 2144 to 2124 BC), was a great patron of new temples early in the period, and an unprecedented 26 statues of Gudea, mostly rather small, have survived from temples, beautifully executed, mostly in "costly and very hard diorite" stone. These exude a confident serenity.

The northern Royal Palace of Mari produced a number of important objects from before about 1800 BC, including the Statue of Iddi-Ilum, and the most extensive remains of Mesopotamian palace frescos.

The Neo-Sumerian art of the Third Dynasty of Ur reached new heights, especially in terms of realism and fine craftmanship.

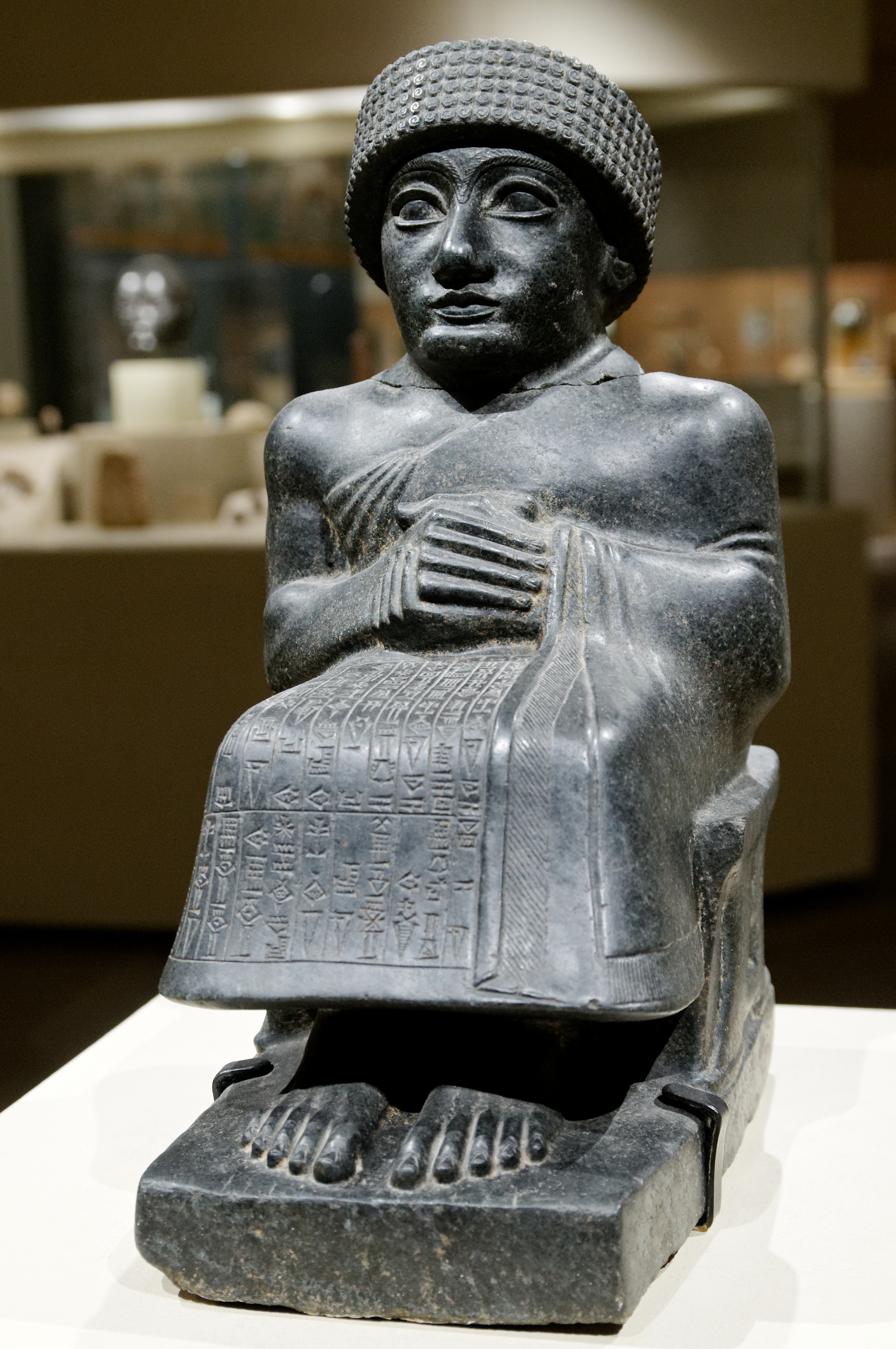
Statue of Gudea P; circa 2090 BC; diorite; height: 44 cm, width: 21.5 cm, depth: 29.5 cm; Metropolitan Museum of Art

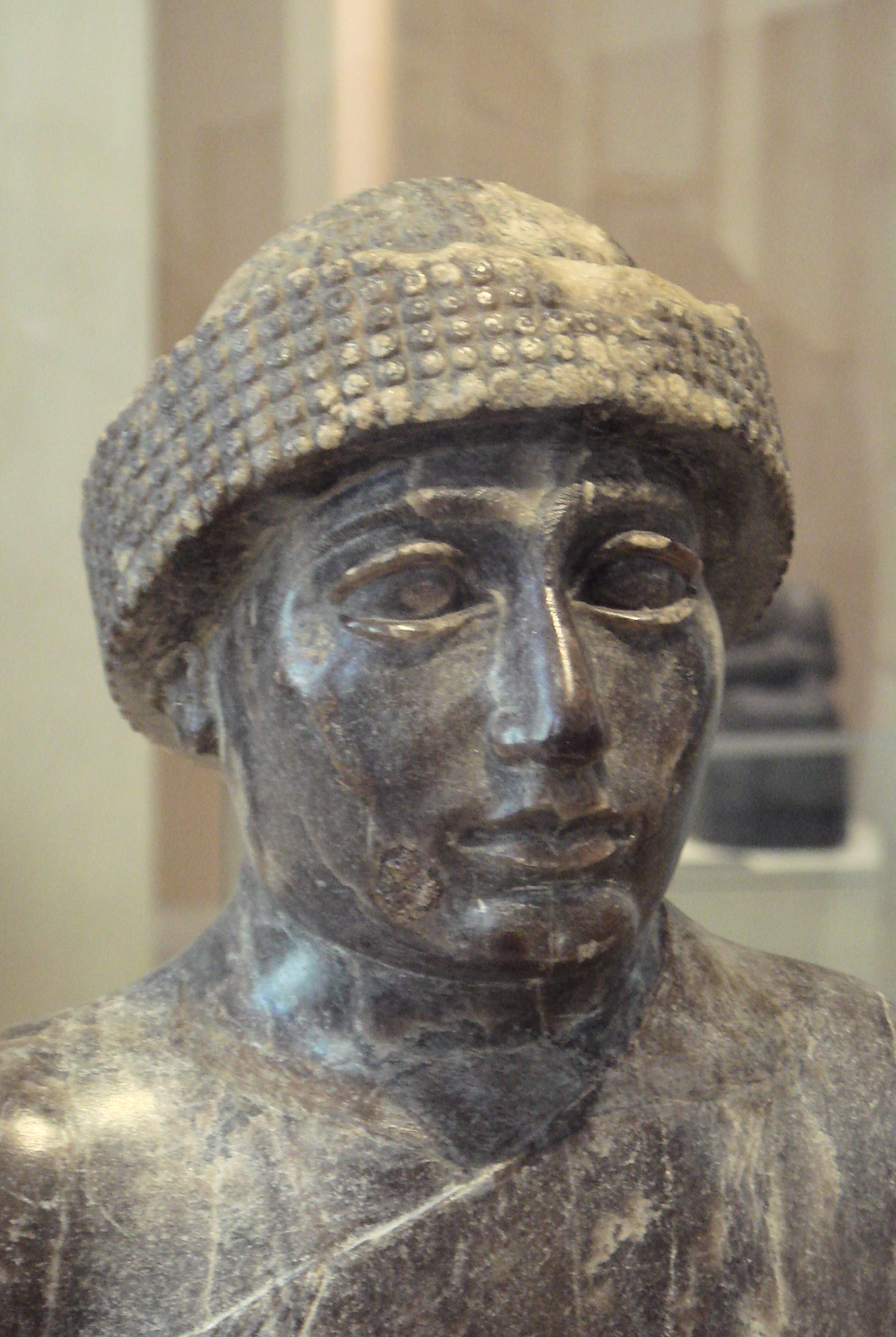
Portrait of Ur-Ningirsu. Louvre Museum

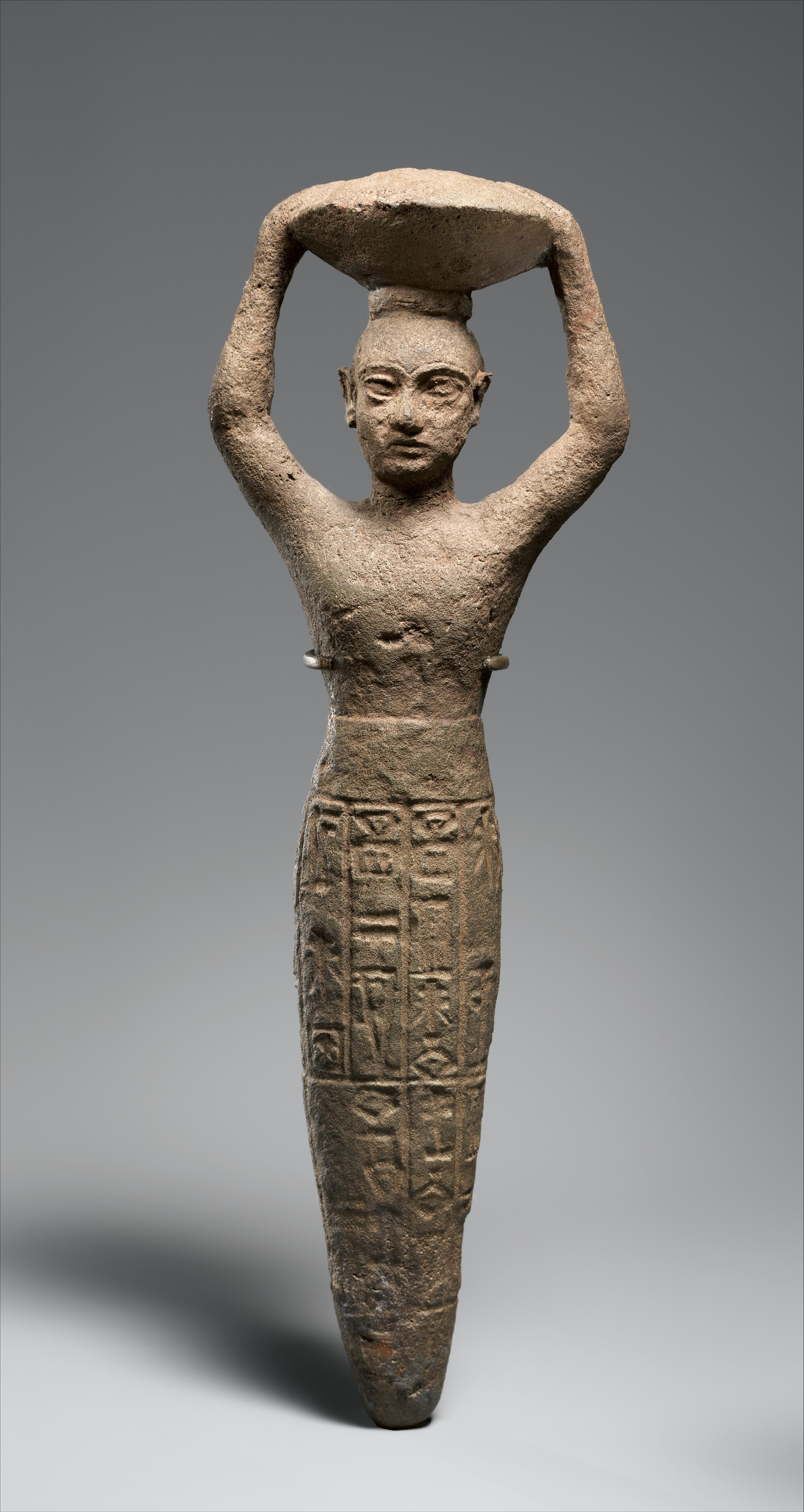
Foundation figure of Ur-Namma holding a basket; 2112-2095 BC; copper alloy; height: 27.3 cm; Metropolitan Museum of Art (New York City)

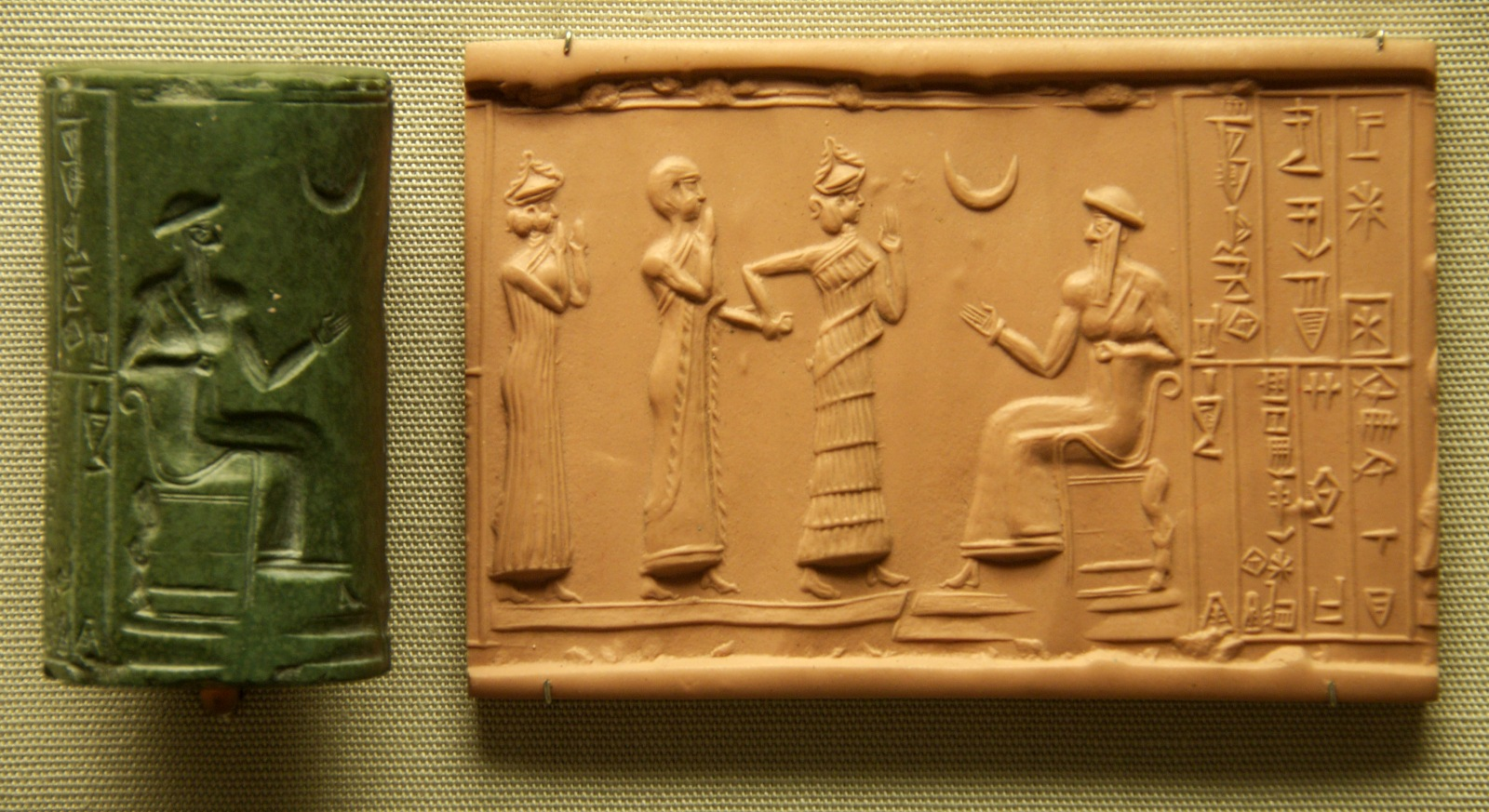
Seal of Hash-hamer, showing enthroned king Ur-Nammu, with modern impression; circa 2100 BC; greenstone; height: 5.3 cm; British Museum (London)

=== Amorite and Kassite periods (c. 2000–1155 BC) ===
The Burney Relief from the Isin-Larsa or First Babylonian Dynasty (19th–18th century BC) is probably either Ereshkigal or Ishtar; clay; 49.5 cm high, 37 cm rice, 4.8 cm thick

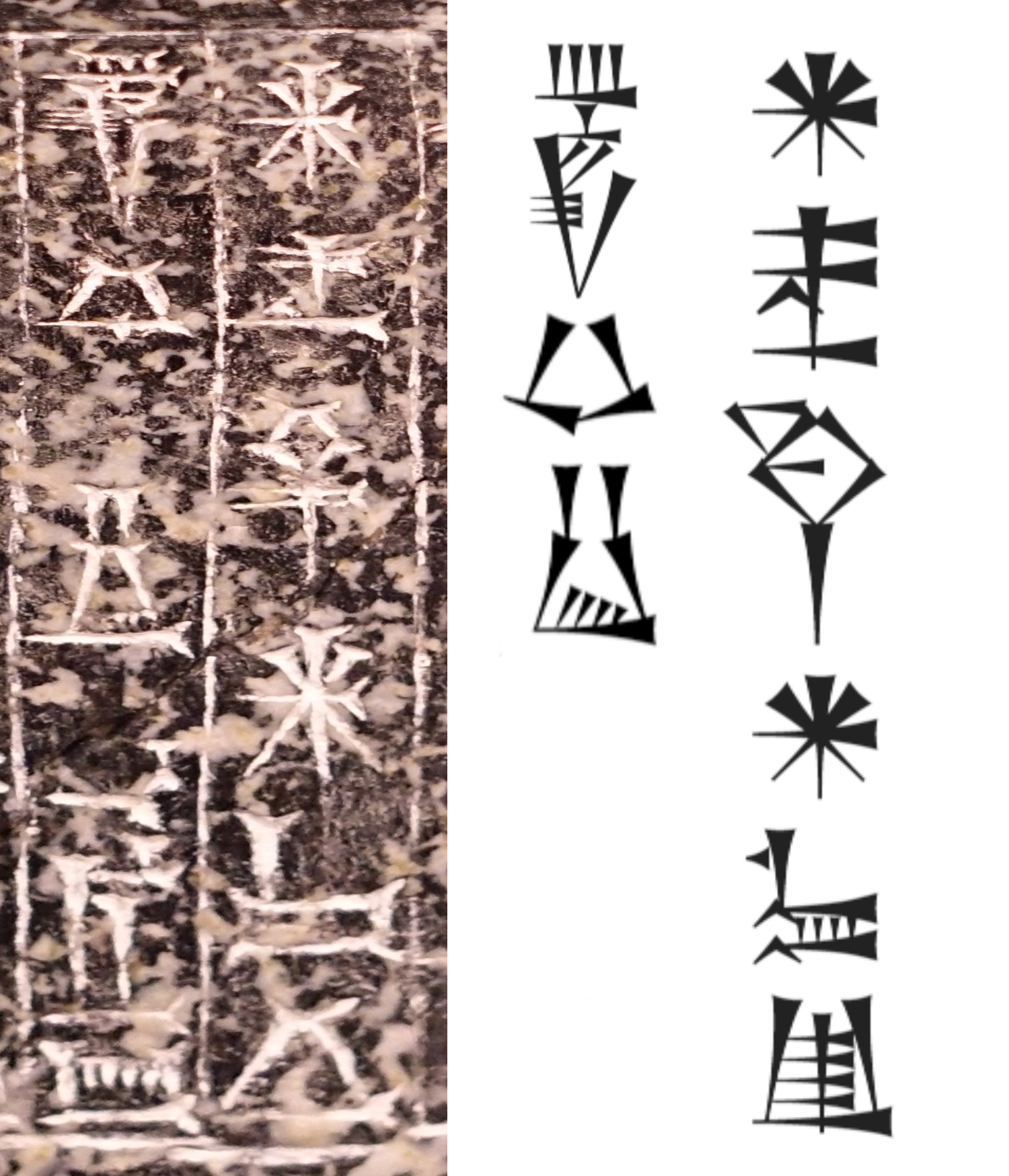
Title "Rim-Sin, King of Larsa" on the stone bowl: 𒀭𒊑𒅎𒀭𒂗𒍪 Rim-Sin 𒈗 King of 𒌓𒀕 Larsa

The political history of this period of nearly 1000 years is complicated, marked by the rise of Semitic-speaking polities originating in northwestern Mesopotamia. The period includes the Amorites Isin-Larsa Period and the First Babylonian Dynasty or Old Babylonian period (c.1830–1531 BC), an interlude under the rule of the Kassites (c. 1531–1155 BC) followed by invasions of the Elamite, while the Middle Assyrian Empire (1392–934 BC) developed in the northern part of Mesopotamia. The period ended with the decisive advent of the Neo-Assyrian Empire under Adad-nirari II, whose reign began in 911 BC.

==== Isin-Larsa period (c. 2000–1763 BCE) ====
The Isin-Larsa period is a period of turmoil, marked by the rise of the influence of the Amorites for the northwest of Mesopotamia. Life was often unstable, and non-Sumerian invasions a recurring theme.

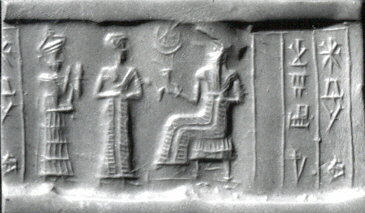
Cylinder seal and modern impression. Presentation scene, c. 2000–1750 BC. Isin-Larsa

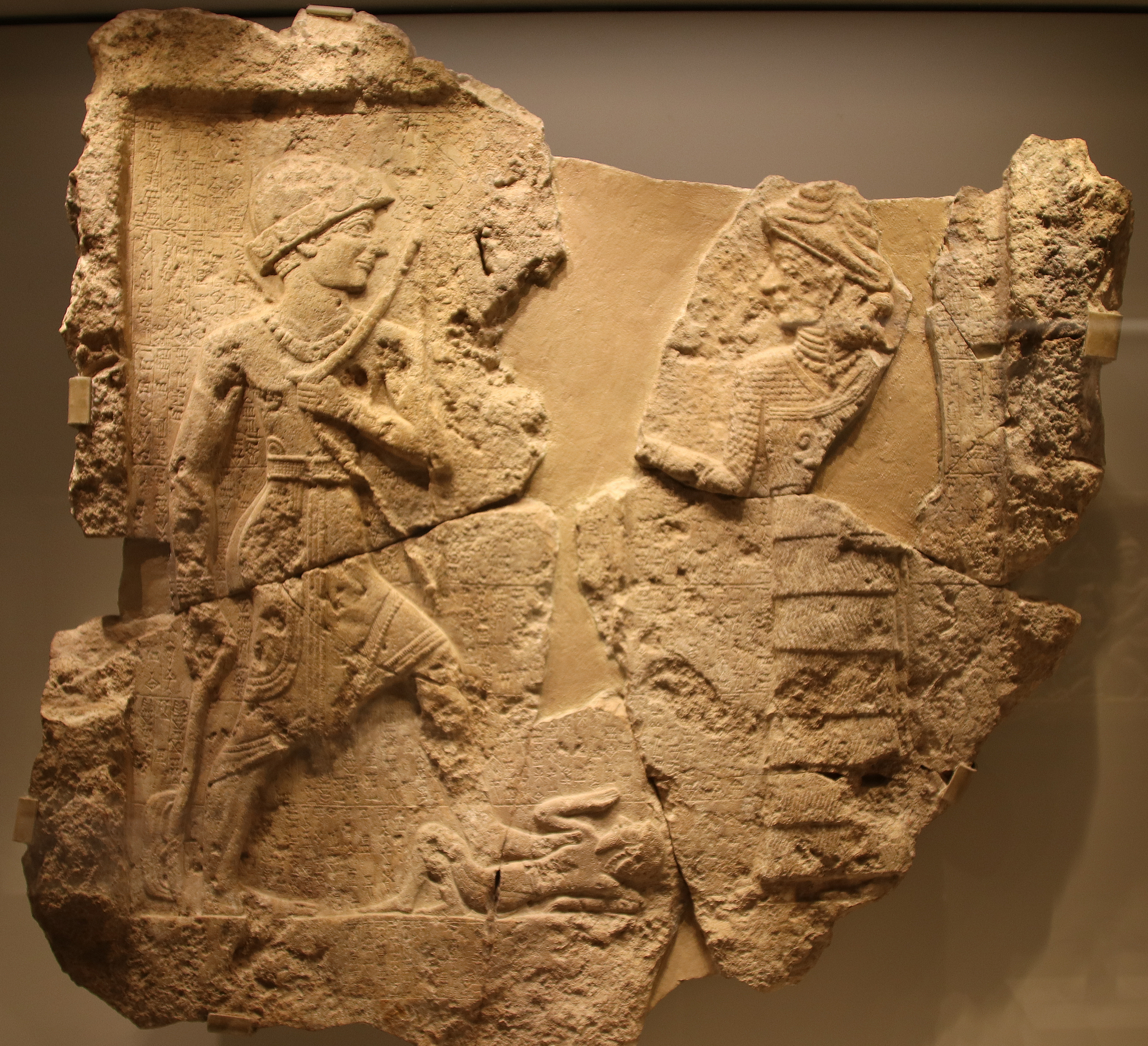
King Iddin-Sin of the Kingdom of Simurrum, holding an axe and a bow, trampling a foe, in front of Goddess Ishtar. Circa 2000 BC.

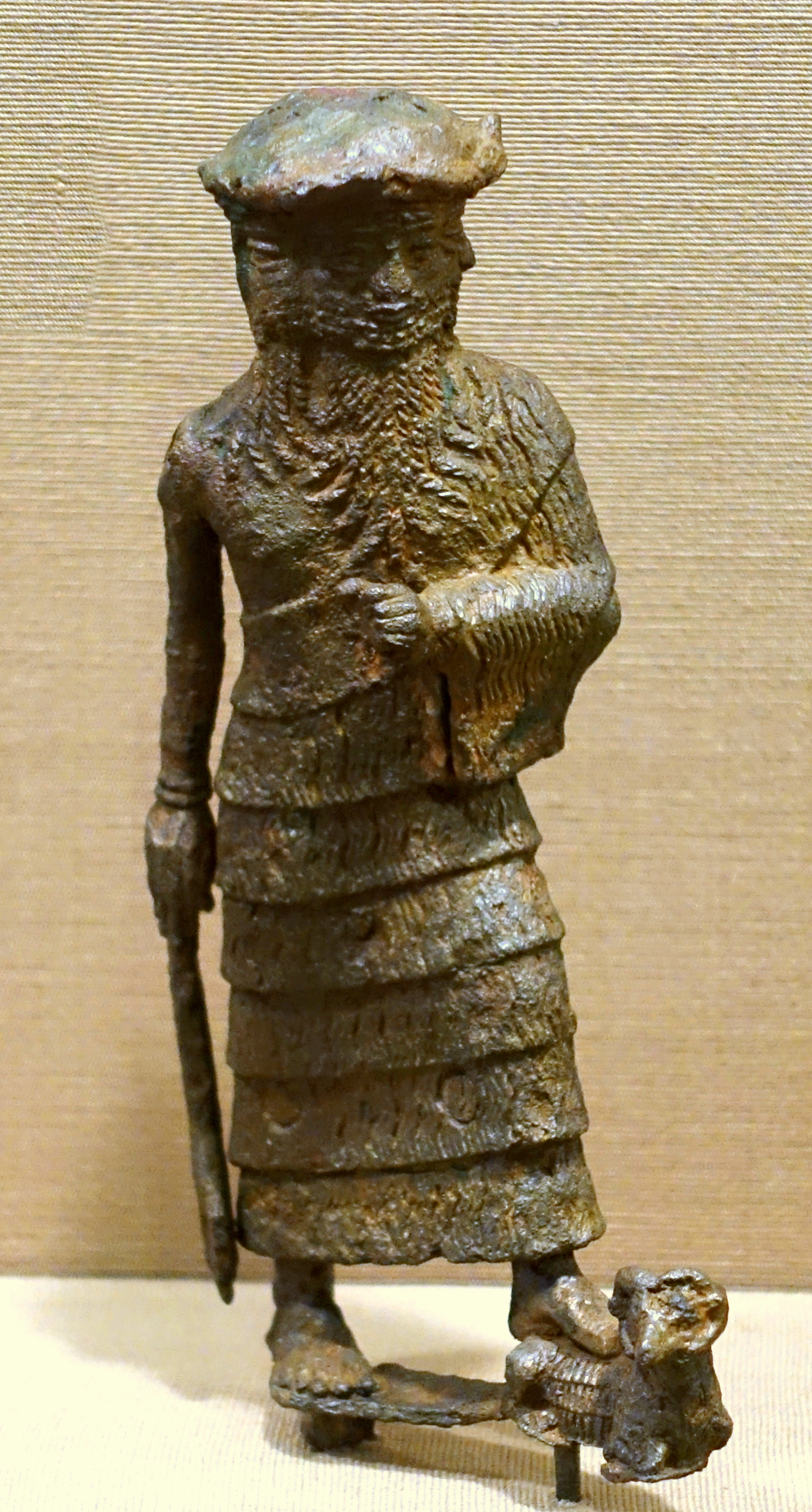
Four-faced god, Ishchali, Isin-Larsa to Old Babylonia periods, 2000–1600 BC, bronze - Oriental Institute Museum, University of Chicago

==== First Babylonian Dynasty (1894–1595 BCE) ====
From the 18th century BC, Hammurabi (1792 BC to 1750 BC), the Amorite ruler of Babylon, turned Babylon into a major power and eventually conquered Mesopotamia and beyond. He is famous for his law code and conquests, but he is also famous due to the large amount of records that exist from the period of his reign. During the period Babylon became a great city, which was often the seat of the dominant power. The period was not one of great artistic development, these invaders failing to bring new artistic impetus, and much religious art was rather self-consciously conservative, perhaps in a deliberate assertion of Sumerian values. The quality of execution is often lower than in preceding and later periods. Some "popular" works of art displayed realism and mouvement, such as the statuette of a walking four-headed god from Ishchali, attributed to the period between 2000 and 1600 BC.

The Burney Relief is an unusual, elaborate, and relatively large (20×15 inches) terracotta plaque of a naked winged goddess with the feet of a bird of prey, and attendant owls and lions. It comes from the 18th or 19th century BC, and may also be moulded. Similar pieces, small statues or reliefs of deities, were made for altars in homes or small wayside shrines, and small moulded terracotta ones were probably available as souvenirs from temples.

The Investiture of Zimri-Lim, now in the Louvre, is a large palace fresco that is the outstanding survival of Mesopotamian wall-painting, although comparable schemes were probably common in palaces.

After the death of Hammurabi, the first Babylonian dynasty lasted for another century and a half, but his empire quickly unravelled, and Babylon once more became a small state. The Amorite dynasty ended in 1595 BC, when Babylonia fell to the Hittite king Mursilis, after which the Kassites took control.

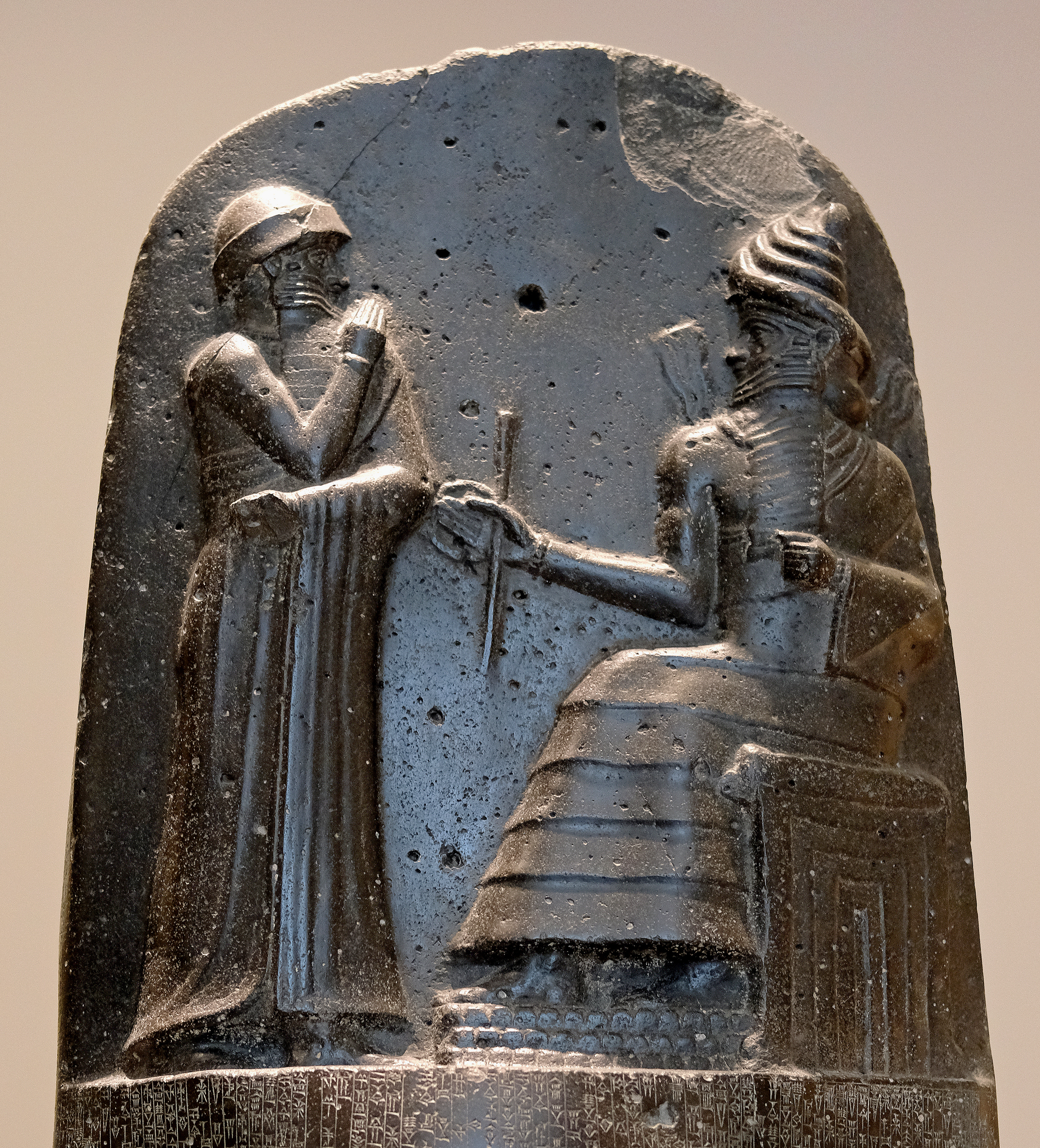
Hammurabi (standing), depicted as receiving his royal insignia from Shamash (or possibly Marduk). Hammurabi holds his hands over his mouth as a sign of prayer (relief on the upper part of the stele of Hammurabi's code of laws).

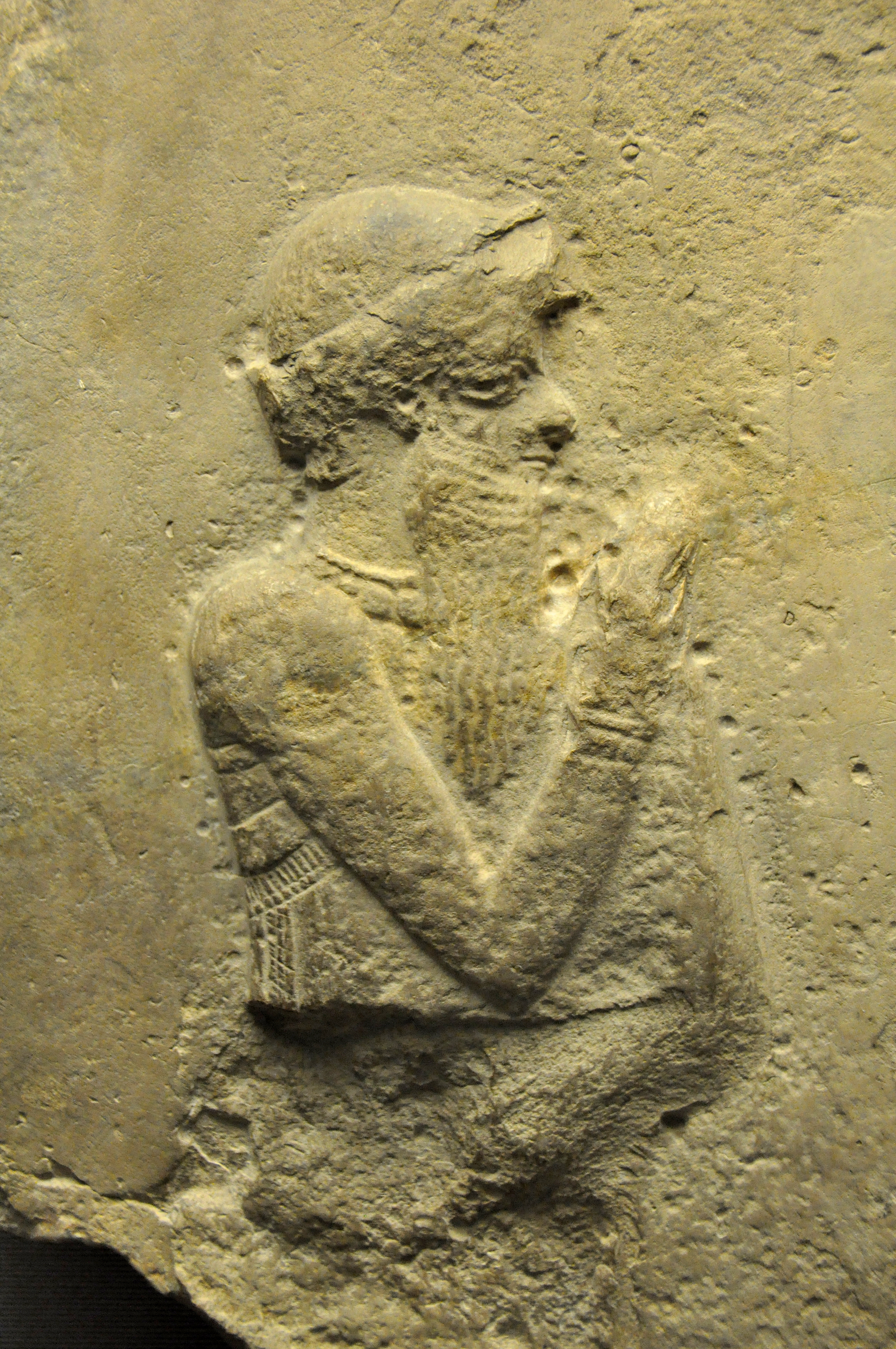
Detail of a limestone votive monument from Sippar, Iraq, dating to c. 1792 – c. 1750 BC showing King Hammurabi raising his right arm in worship, now held in the British Museum

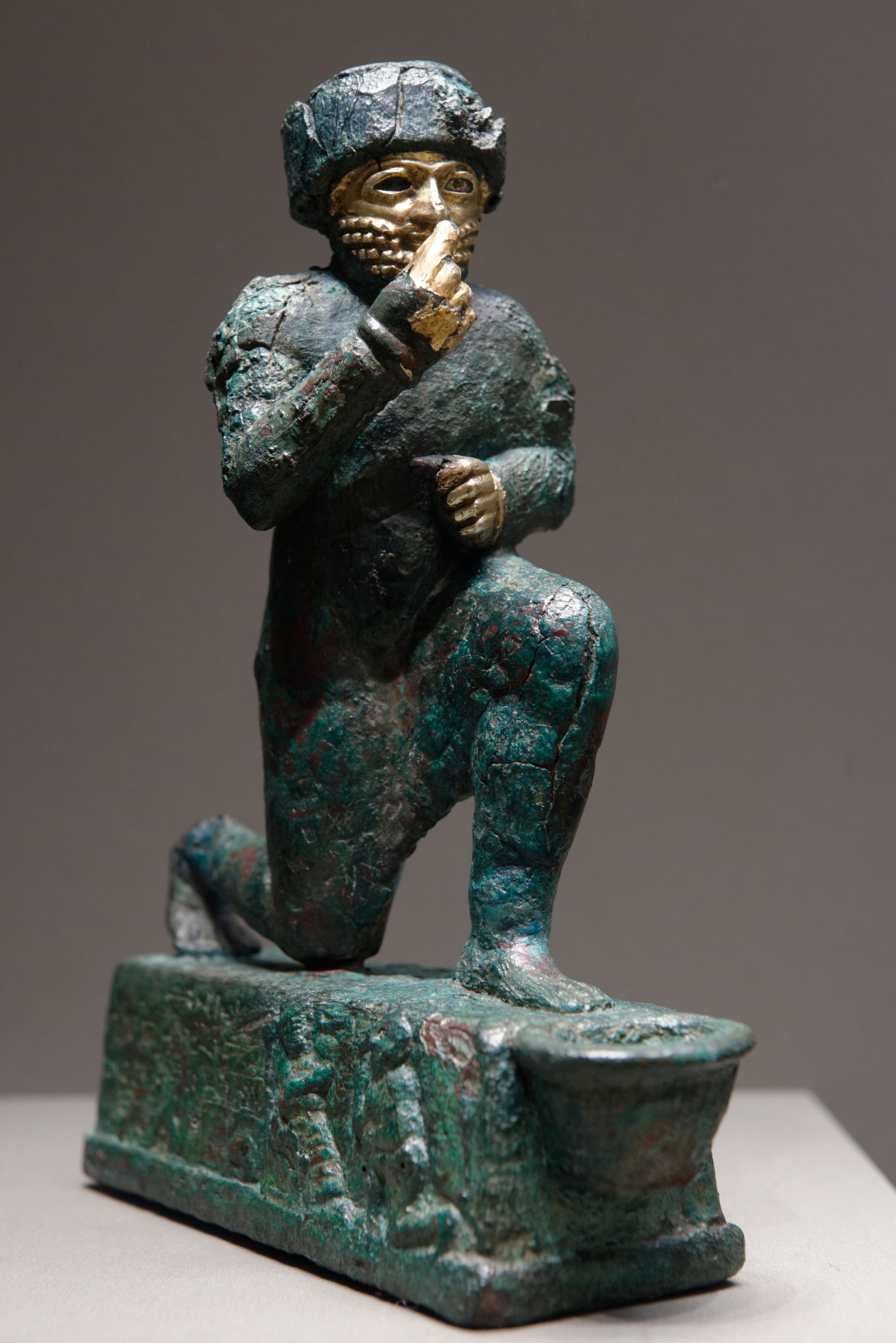
"The Worshipper of Larsa", a votive statuette dedicated to the god Amurru for Hammurabi's life; circa 1760 BC; bronze and gold; 19 x 15 cm; Louvre

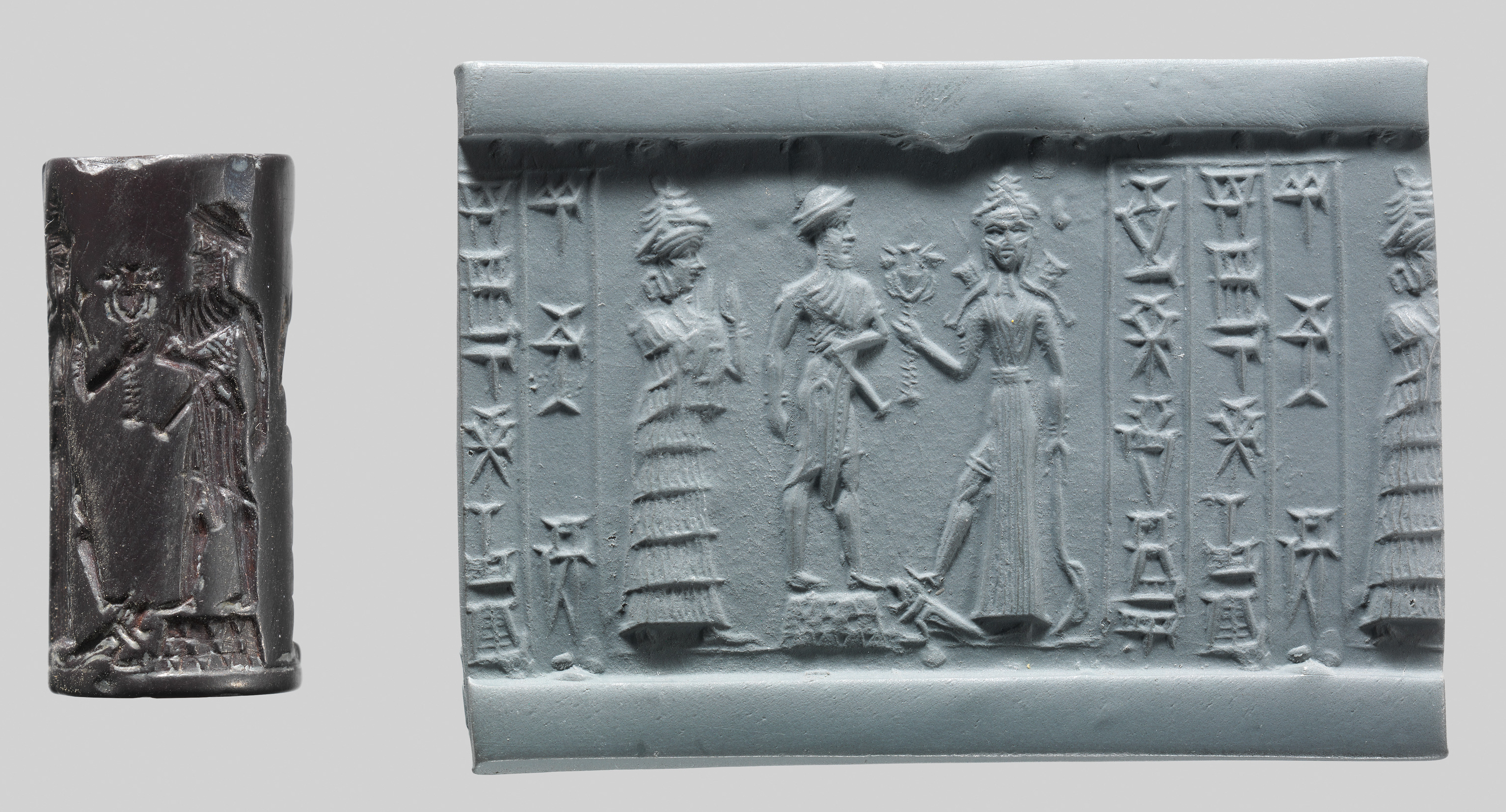
Cylinder seal, ca. 18th–17th century BC. Babylonia

==== Kassites (1600–1155 BC) ====
The original homeland of the Kassites is not well-known, but appears to have been located in the Zagros Mountains, in what is now the Lorestan Province of Iran. This was generally not a period of the highest quality for cylinder seal images; at different times the inscription took prominence over the image, and the variety of scenes shown reduced, with the "presentation scene" of a king before a god, or an official before a seated king, becoming the norm at times. Especially from the Kassite period several stone kudurru stelae survive, mostly taken up with inscriptions recording grants of land, boundary lines, and other official records, but often with figures and emblems of the gods or the king as well; a land grant by Meli-Shipak II is an example.

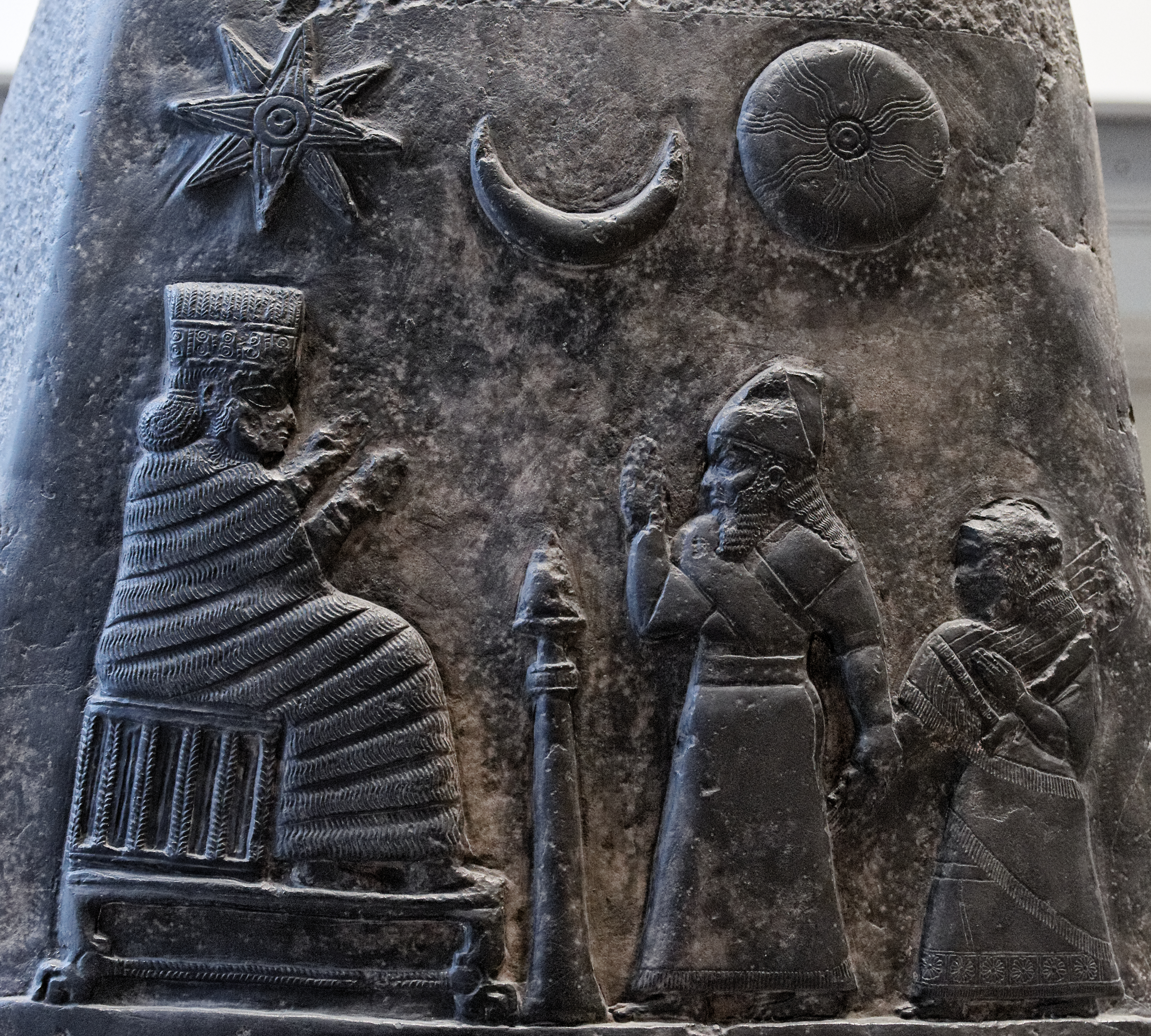
Kassite king Meli-Shipak II on his throne on a kudurru-Land grant to Ḫunnubat-Nanaya. The eight-pointed star was Inanna-Ishtar's most common symbol. Here it is shown alongside the solar disk of her brother Shamash (Sumerian Utu) and the crescent moon of her father Sin (Sumerian Nanna).

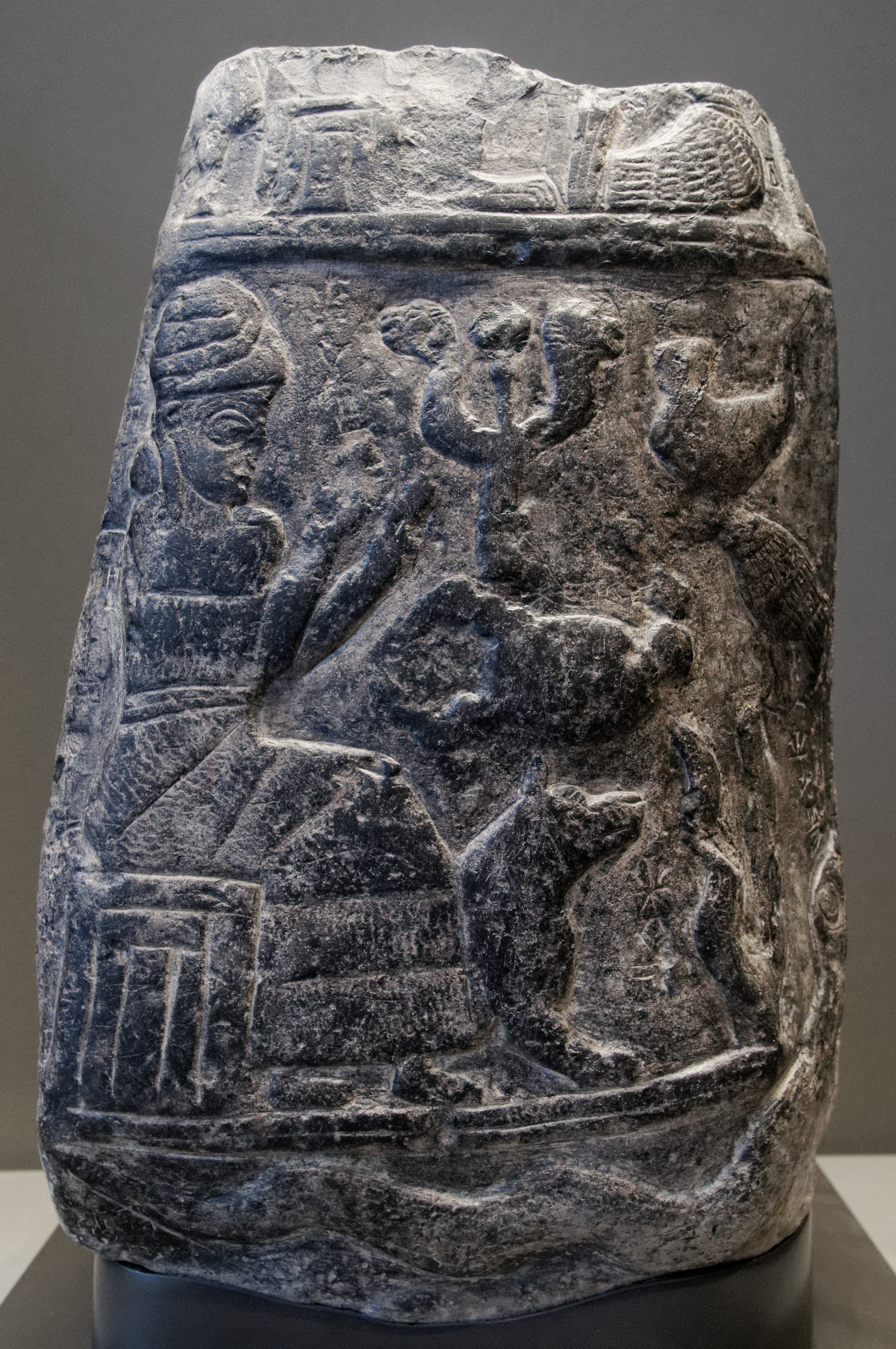
Kassite Kudurru stele of Kassite king Marduk-apla-iddina I. Louvre Museum.

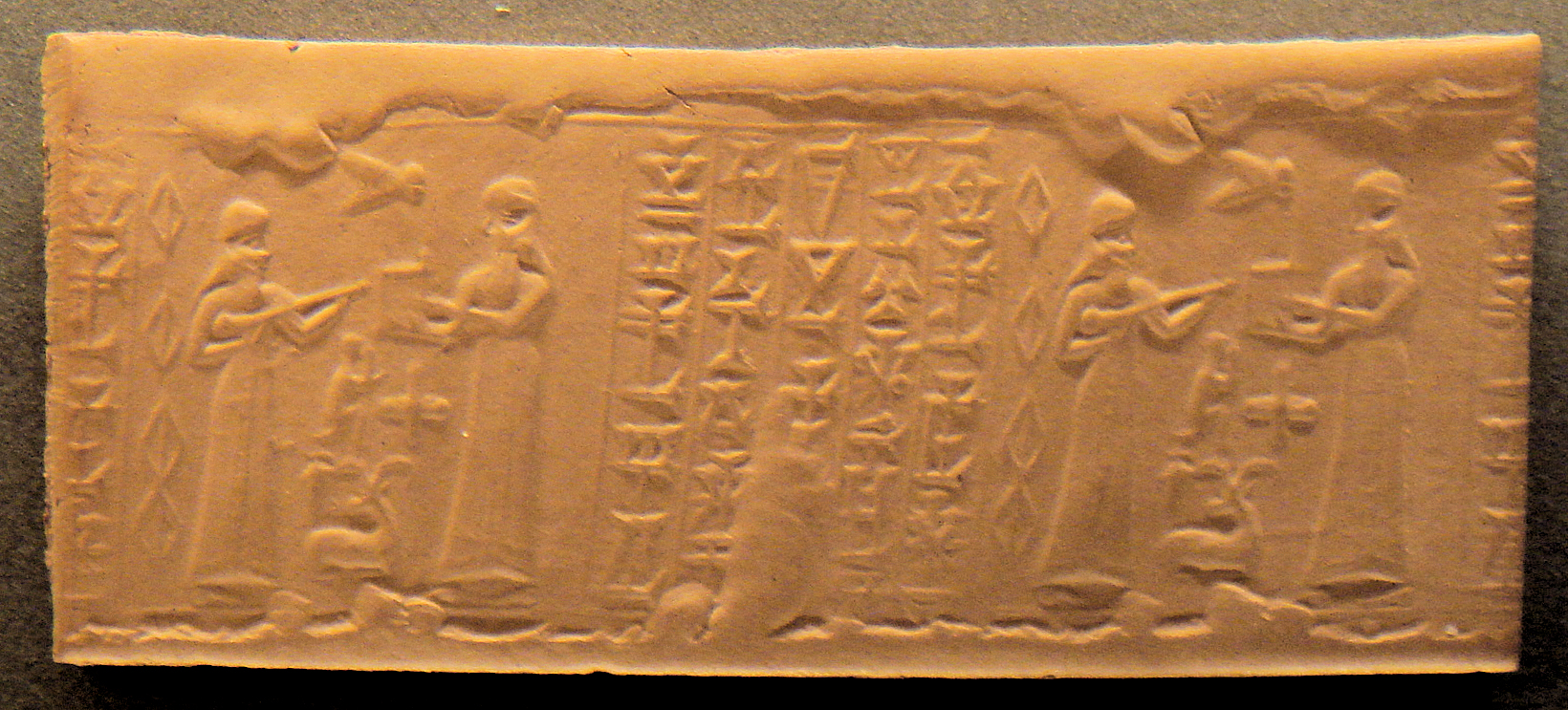
Cylinder seal of Kassite king Kurigalzu II (c. 1332–1308 BC). Louvre Museum AOD 105

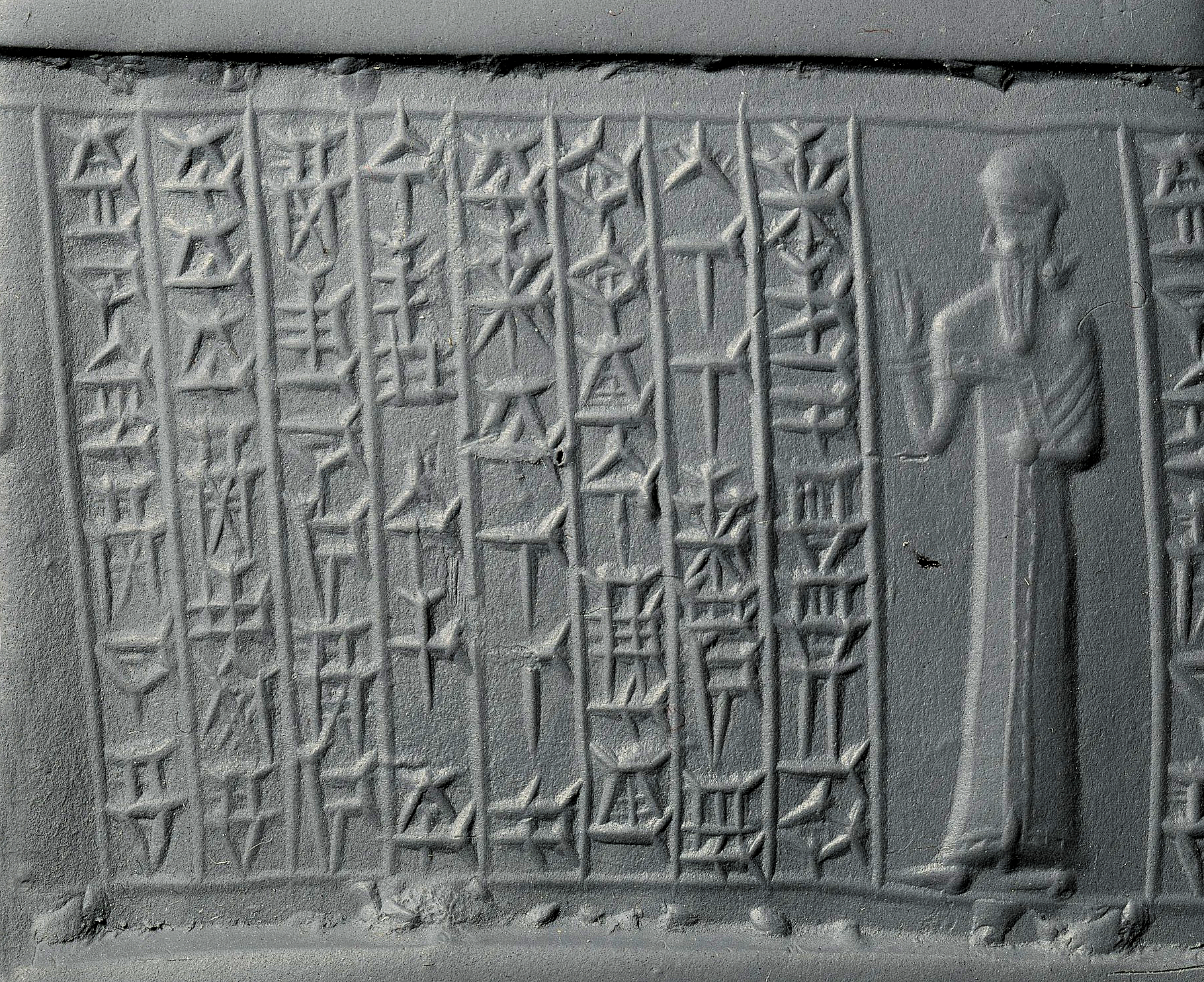
Kassite cylinder seal, ca. 16th–12th century BC.

=== Assyrian period (c. 1500 – 612 BC) ===
An Assyrian artistic style distinct from that of Babylonian art, which was the dominant contemporary art in Mesopotamia, began to emerge c. 1500 BC, well before their empire included Sumer, and lasted until the fall of Nineveh in 612 BC.

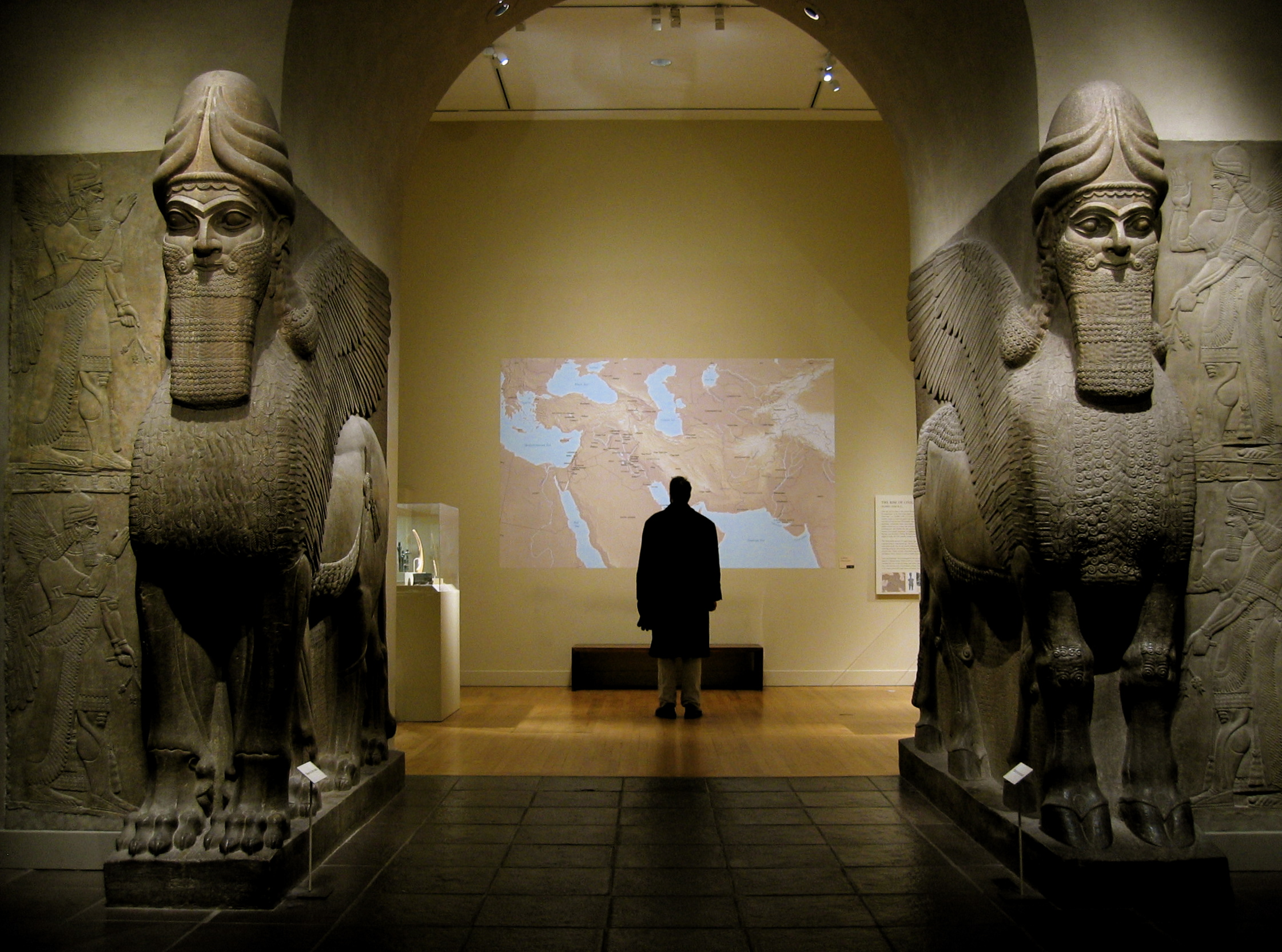
Pair of Lamassus, Nimrud

The conquest of the whole of Mesopotamia and much surrounding territory by the Neo-Assyrian Empire (911–609 BC) created a larger and wealthier state than the region had known before, and very grandiose art in palaces and public places, no doubt partly intended to match the splendour of the art of the neighbouring Egyptian empire. From around 879 BC the Assyrians developed a style of extremely large schemes of very finely detailed narrative low reliefs in stone or gypsum alabaster, originally painted, for palaces. The precisely delineated reliefs concern royal affairs, chiefly hunting and war making. Predominance is given to animal forms, particularly horses and lions, which are magnificently represented in great detail.

Human figures are comparatively rigid and static but are also minutely detailed, as in triumphal scenes of sieges, battles, and individual combat. Among the best known Assyrian reliefs are the famous Lion Hunt of Ashurbanipal scenes in alabaster, and the Lachish reliefs showing a war campaign in the Kingdom of Judah, both of which are of the 7th century BC, from Nineveh and now in the British Museum. Reliefs were also carved into rock faces, as at Shikaft-e Gulgul, a style which the Persians continued.

The Assyrians produced relatively little sculpture in the round, with the partial exception of colossal human-headed lamassu guardian figures, with the bodies of lions or bulls, which are sculpted in high relief on two sides of a rectangular block, with the heads effectively in the round (and often also five legs, so that both views seem complete). These marked fortified royal gateways, an architectural form common throughout Asia Minor. A single statue of a nude female is known. The Assyrian form of the winged genie, winged spirits with bearded human heads seen in reliefs, influenced Ancient Greek art, which in its "orientalizing period" added various winged mythological beasts including the Chimera, griffin and winged horses (Pegasus) and men (Talos). Many carry the bucket and cone.

Even before dominating the region the Assyrians had continued the cylinder seal tradition with designs which are often exceptionally energetic and refined. At Nimrud the carved Nimrud ivories and bronze bowls were found that are decorated in the Assyrian style but were produced in several parts of the Near East including many by Phoenician and Aramaean artisans.

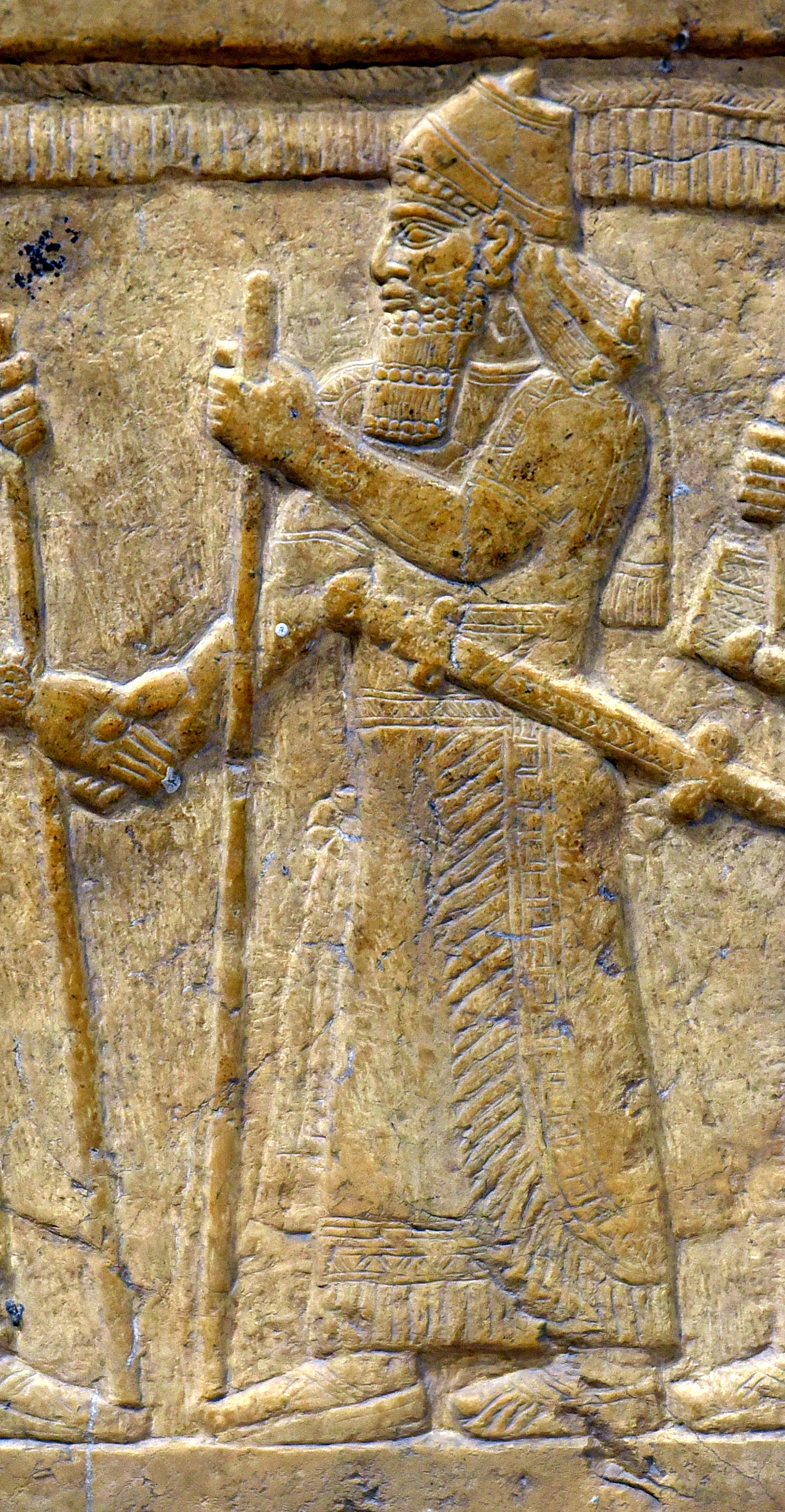
Shalmaneser III, on the Throne Dais of Shalmaneser III at the Iraq Museum.

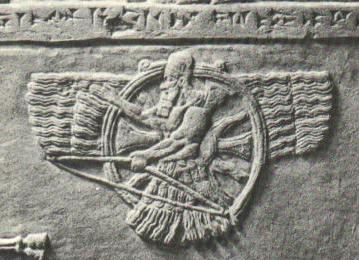
A Neo-Assyrian relief of Ashur as a feather robed archer holding a bow instead of a ring (9th-8th century BC)

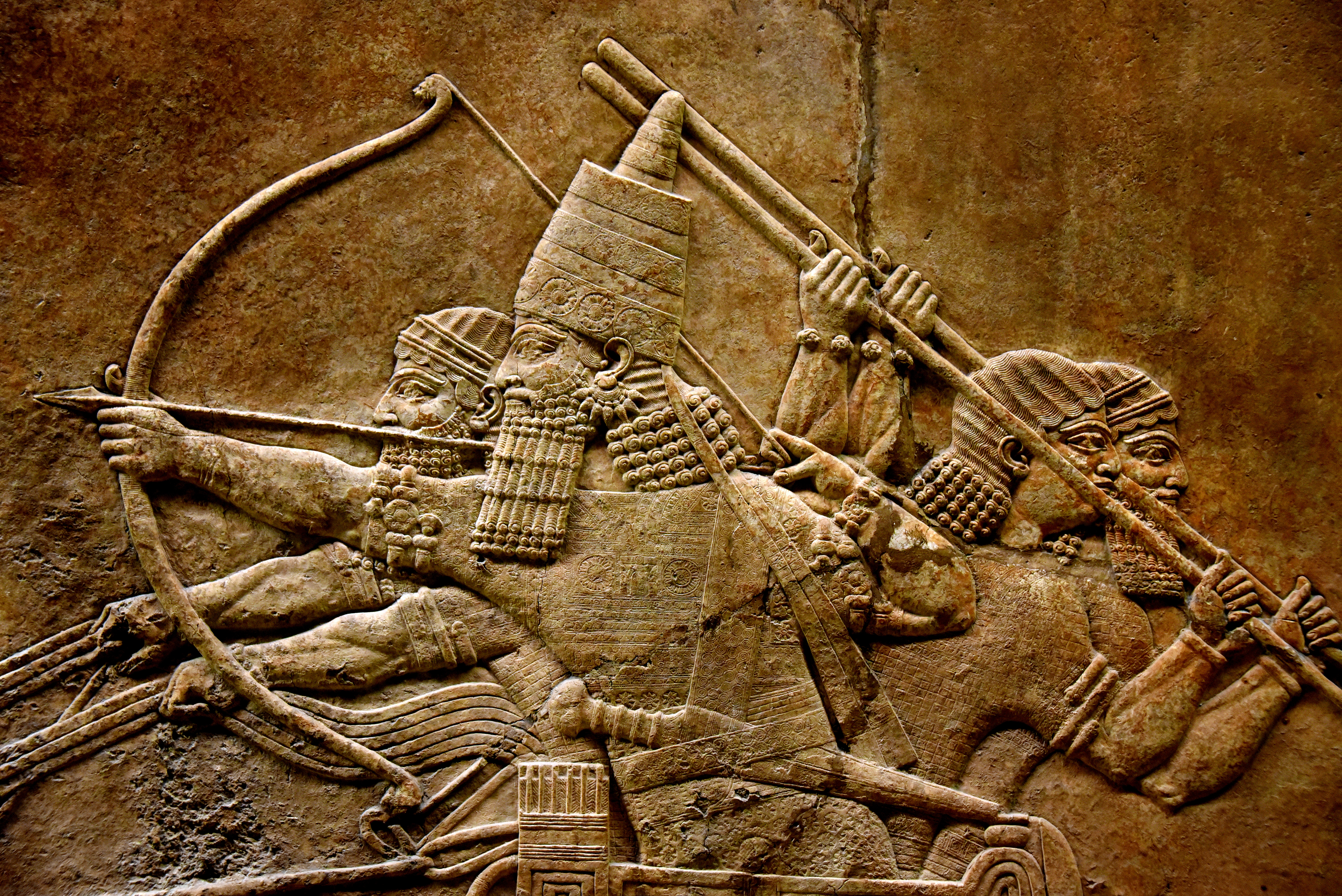
7th-century BC relief depicting Ashurbanipal (r. 669–631 BC) and three royal attendants in a chariot. From the North Palace at Nineveh

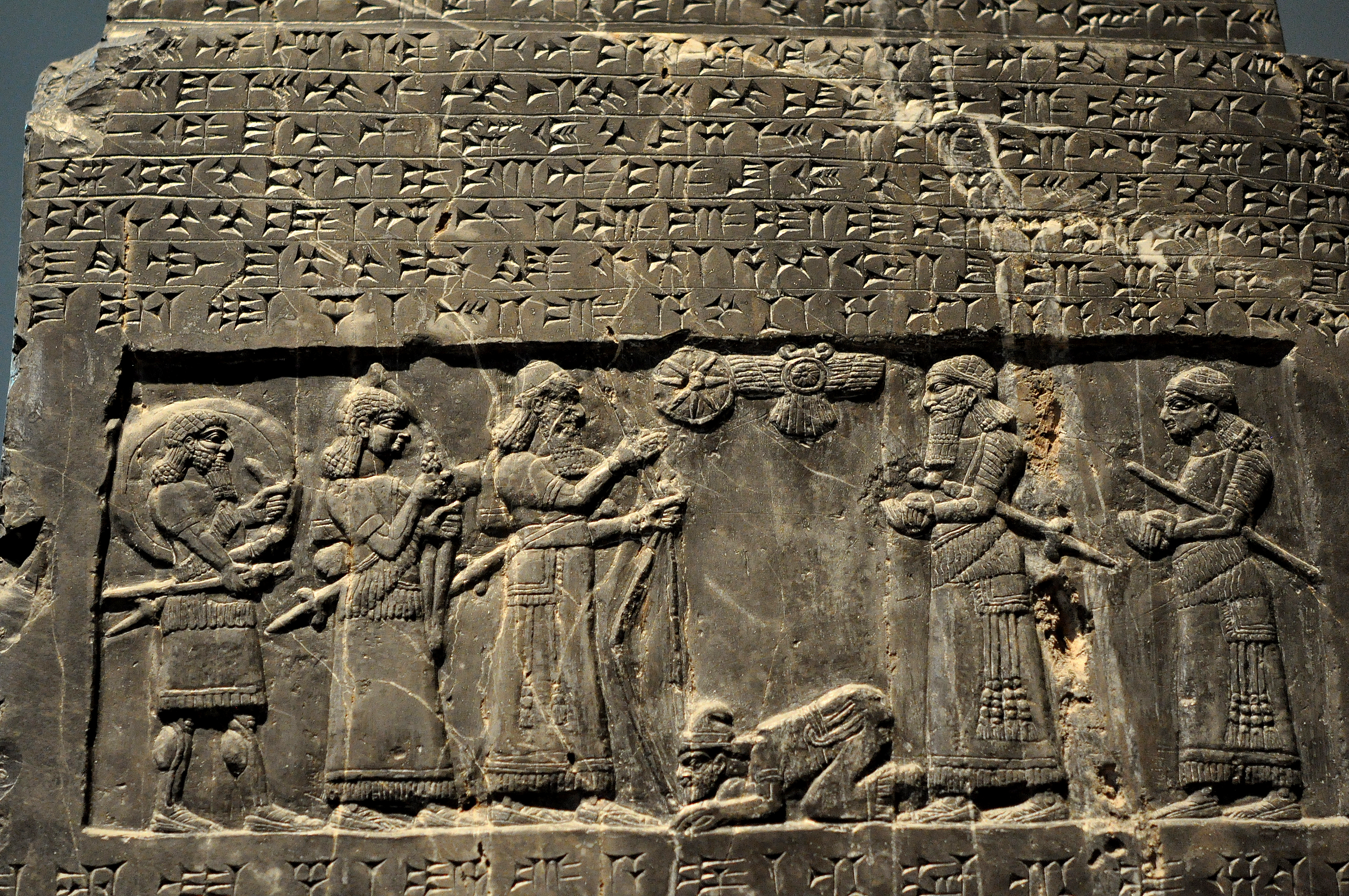
The Black Obelisk of Shalmaneser III. The king, surrounded by his royal attendants and a high-ranking official, receives a tribute from Sua, king of Gilzanu (north-west Iran), who bows and prostrates before the king. From Nimrud

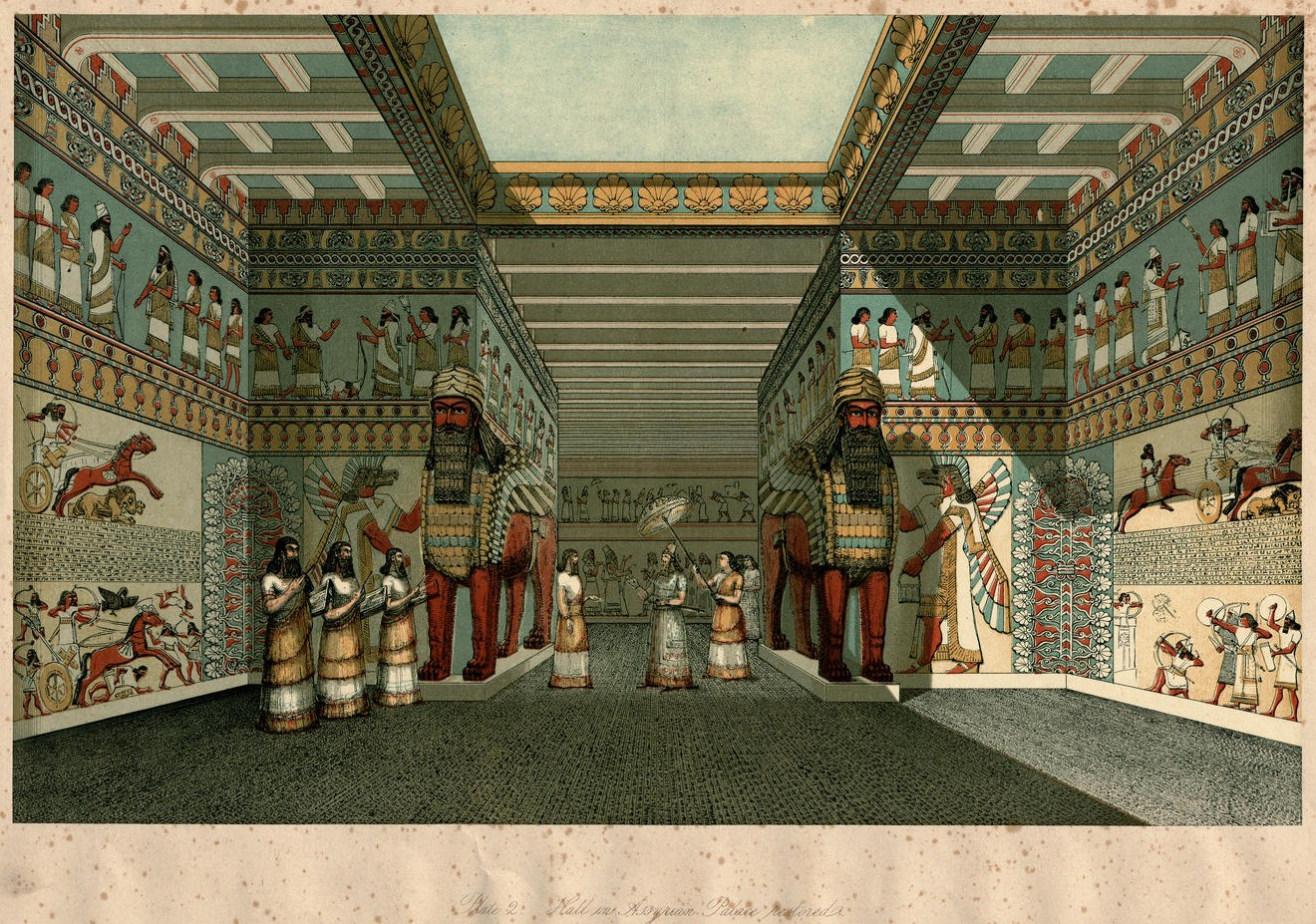
Illustration of a hall in the Assyrian Palace of Ashurnasrirpal II by Austen Henry Layard (1854)

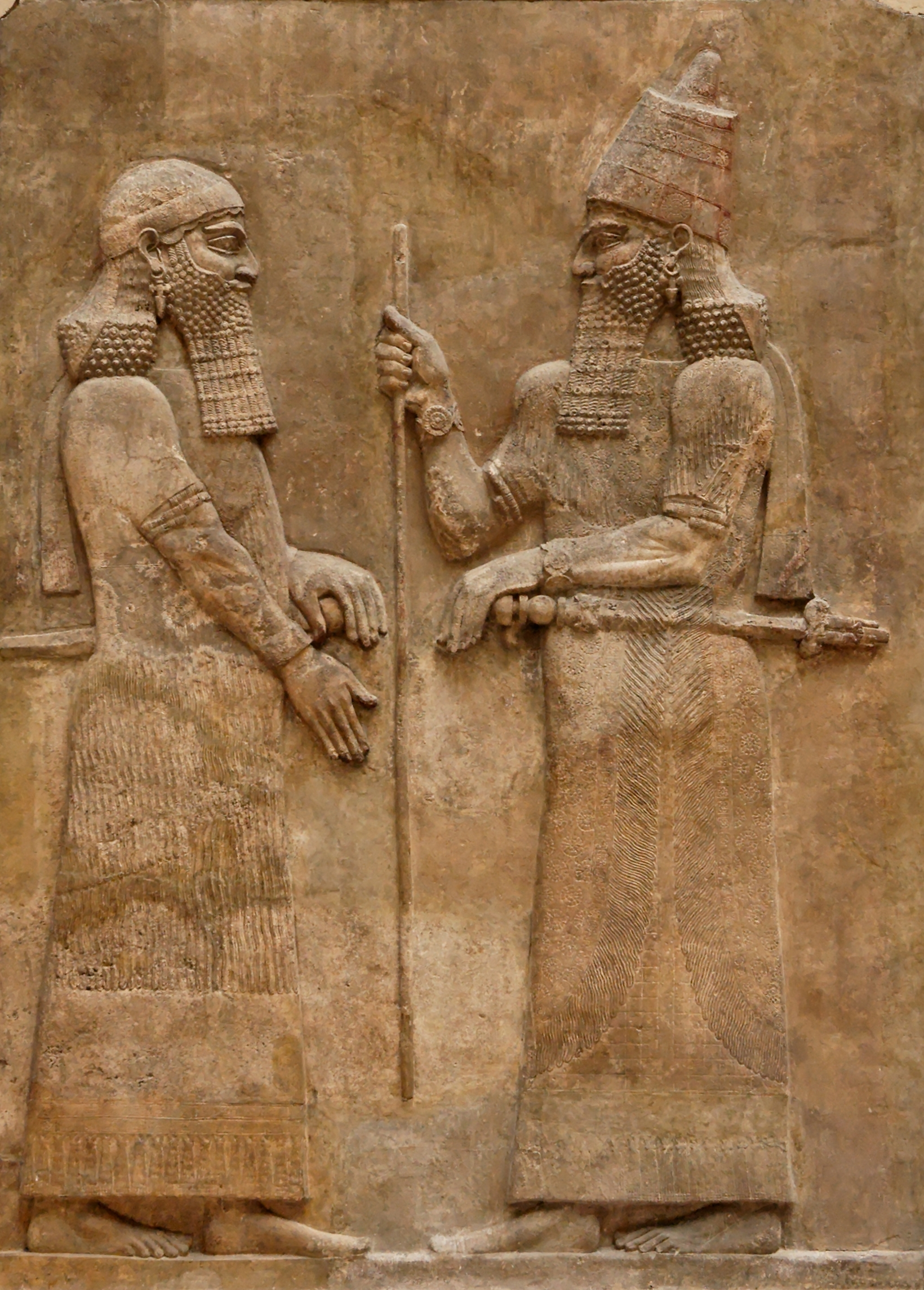
Sargon II and dignitary. Low-relief from the L wall of the palace of Sargon II at Dur Sharrukin in Assyria (modern-day Khorsabad in Iraq), c. 716–713 BC.

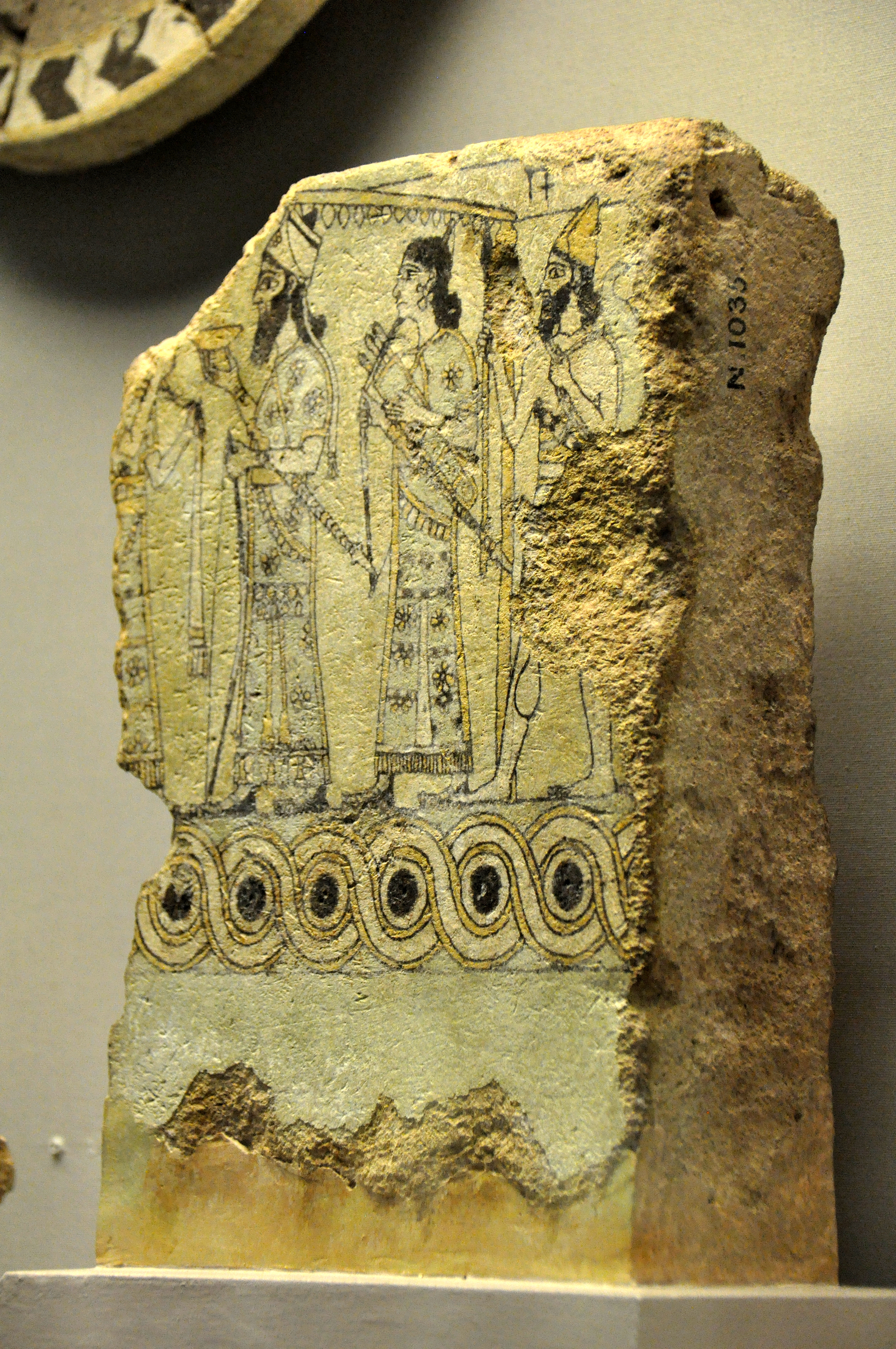
Glazed terracotta tile from Nimrud, with a court scene, British Museum

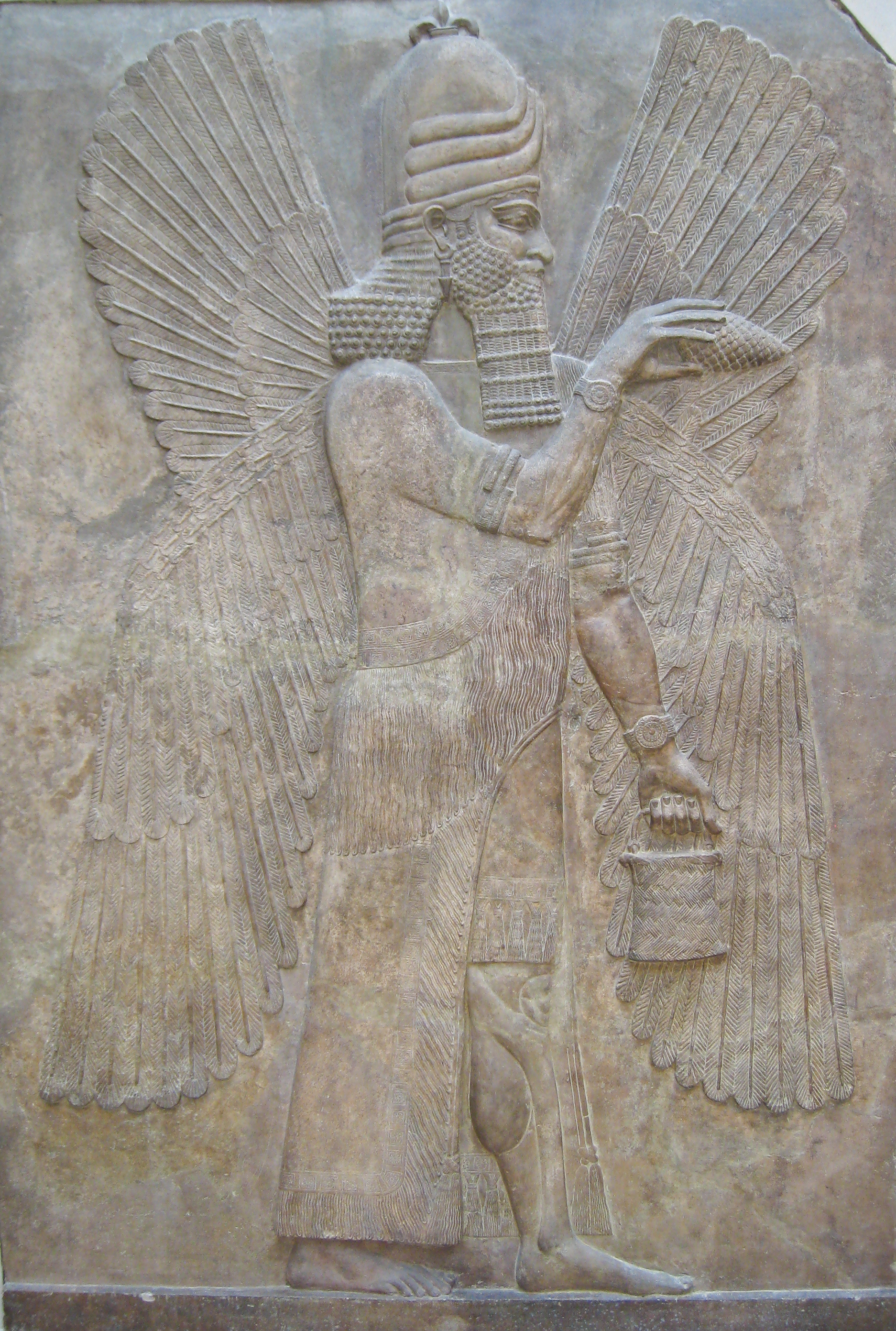
Relief with a winged genie with bucket and cone; 713-706 BC; height: 3.3 m

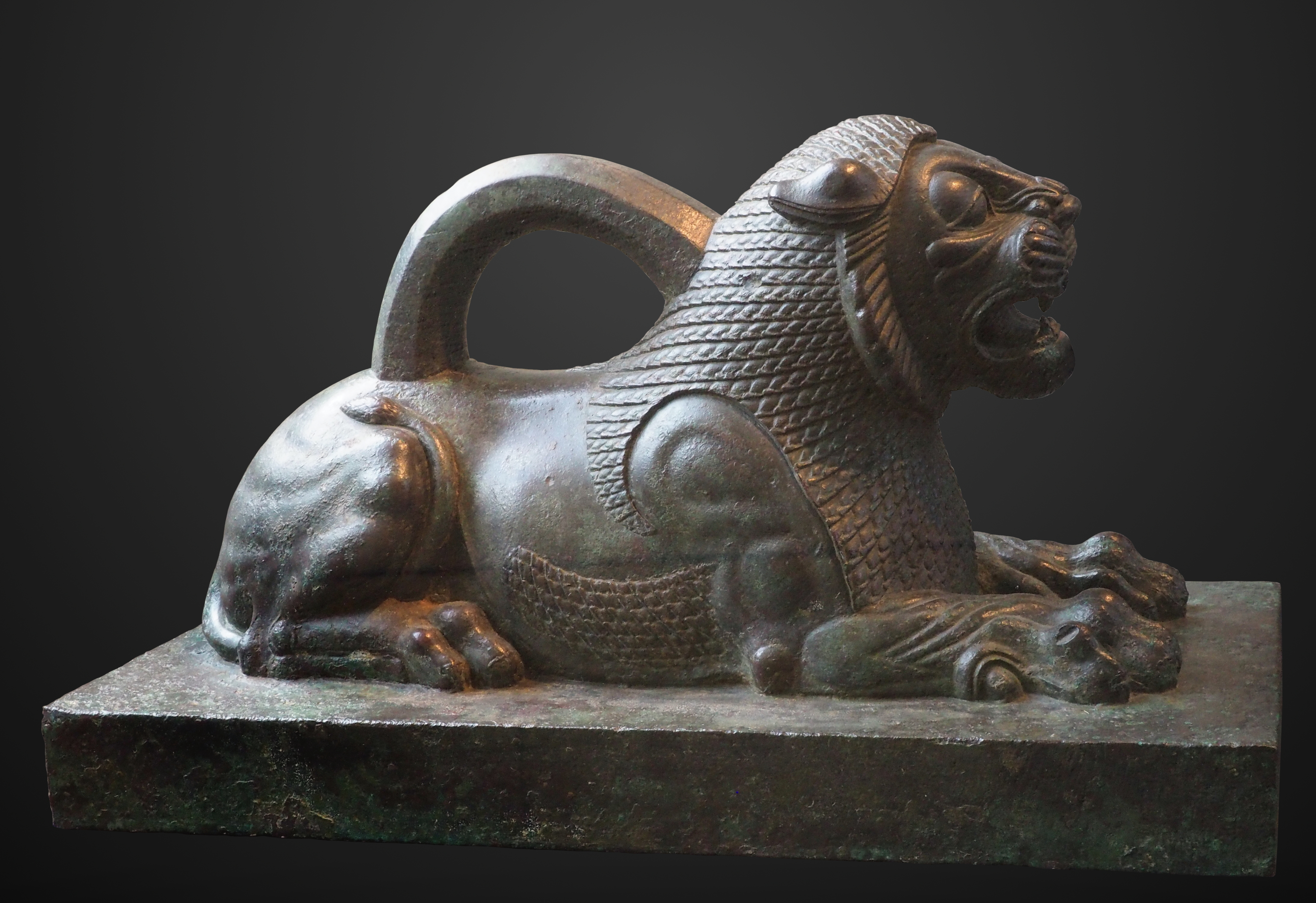
Lion weight; 6th-4th century BC; bronze; height: 29.5 cm, Louvre

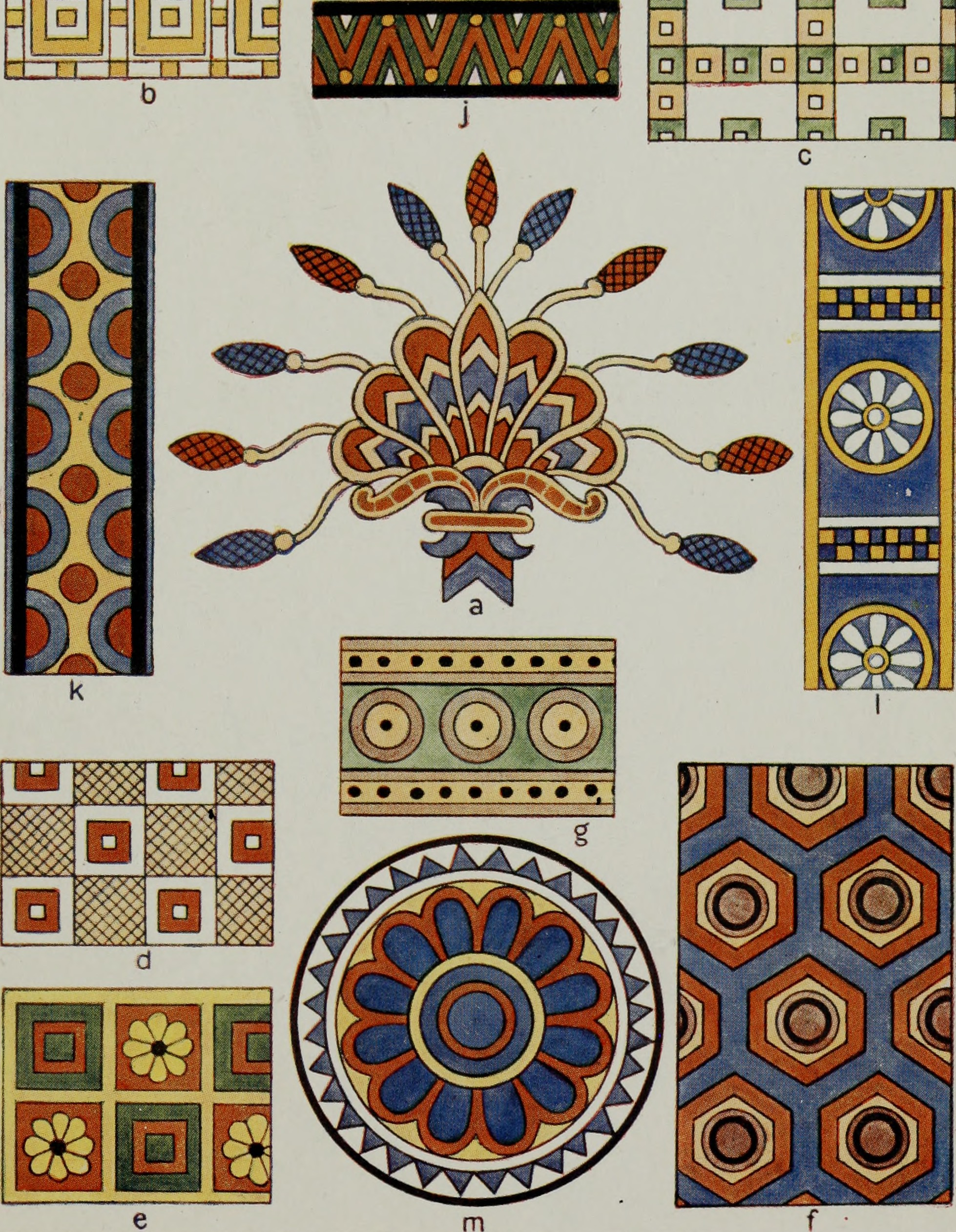
Assyrian ornaments and patterns, illustrated in a book from 1920

=== Neo-Babylonian period (626–539 BC) ===
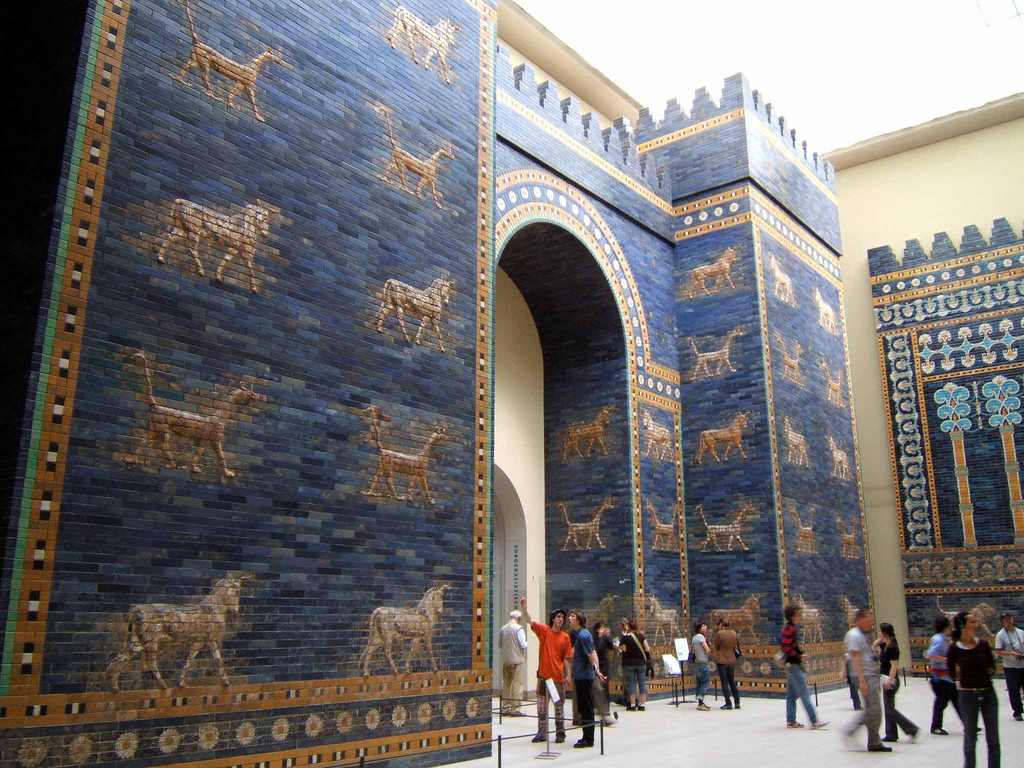
The reconstruction of the Ishtar Gate in the Pergamon Museum (Berlin)

The famous Ishtar Gate, part of which is now reconstructed in the Pergamon Museum in Berlin, was the main entrance into Babylon, built in about 575 BC by Nebuchadnezzar II, the king of the Neo-Babylonian Empire, who exiled the Jews; the empire lasted from 626 BC to 539 BC. The walls surrounding the entrance way are decorated with rows of large relief animals in glazed brick, which has therefore retained its colours. Lions, dragons and bulls are represented. The gate was part of a much larger scheme for a processional way into the city, from which there are sections in many other museums. Large wooden gates throughout the period were strengthened and decorated with large horizontal metal bands, often decorated with reliefs, several of which have survived, such as the various Balawat Gates.

Other traditional types of art continued to be produced, and the Neo-Babylonians were very keen to stress their ancient heritage. Many sophisticated and finely carved seals survive. After Mesopotamia fell to the Persian Achaemenid Empire, which had much simpler artistic traditions, Mesopotamian art was, with Ancient Greek art, the main influence on the cosmopolitan Achaemenid style that emerged, and many ancient elements were retained in the area even in the Hellenistic art that succeeded the conquest of the region by Alexander the Great.

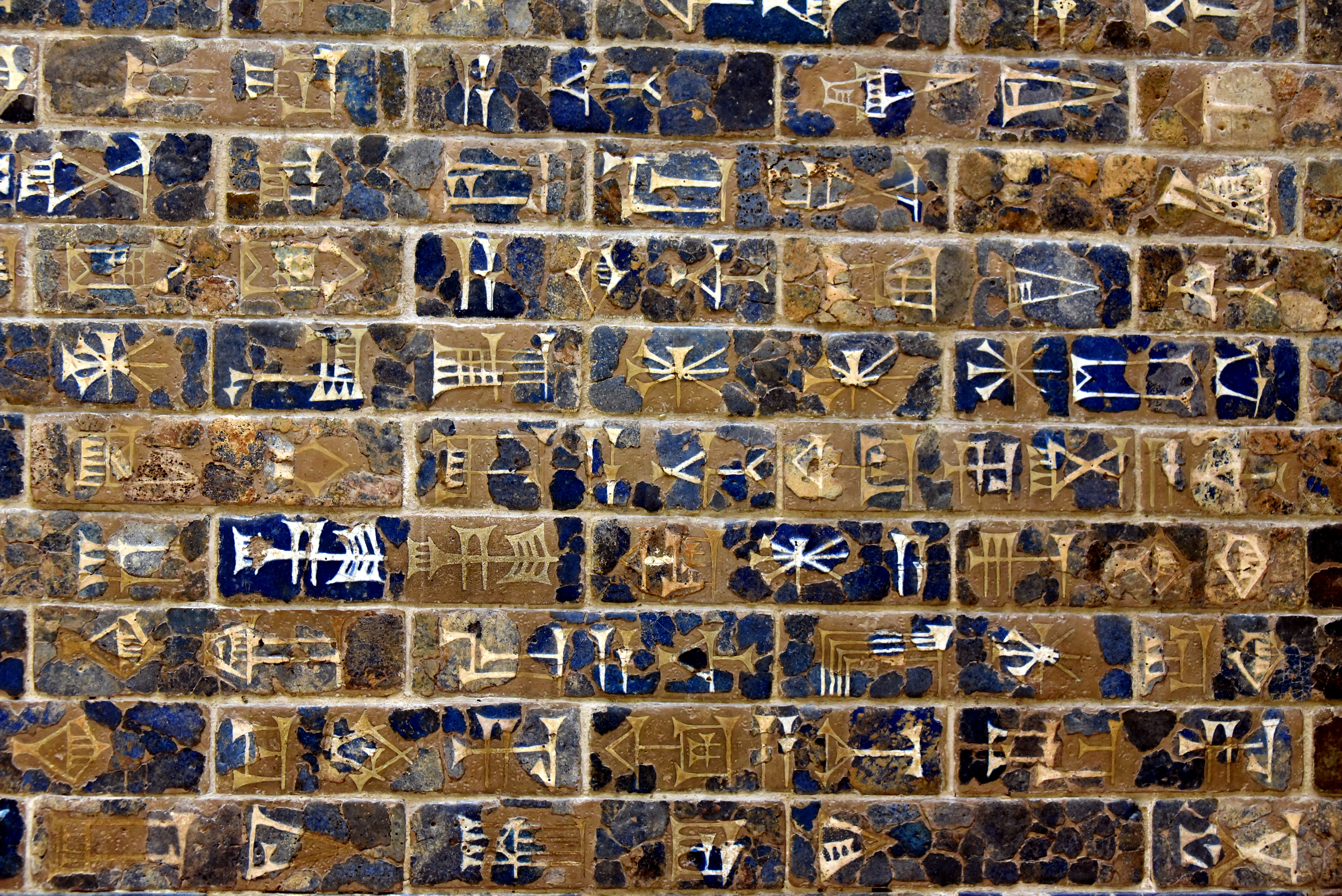
Detail of Nebuchadnezzar II's Building Inscription plaque of the Ishtar Gate, from Babylon, Iraq. 6th century BC. Pergamon Museum

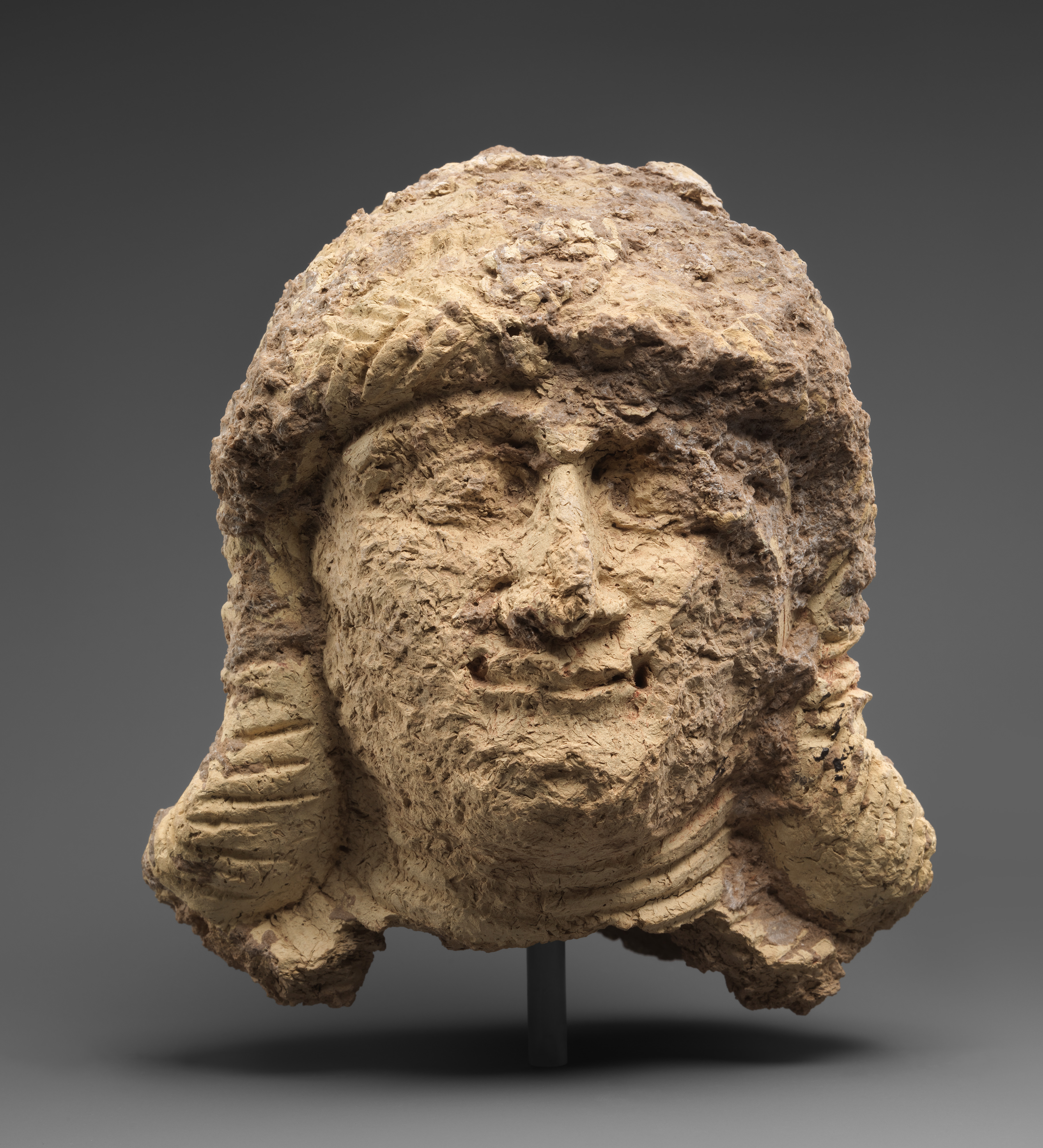
Female head; circa 2000-1600 BC; ceramic; 18 x 12.7 cm; Metropolitan Museum of Art (New York City)

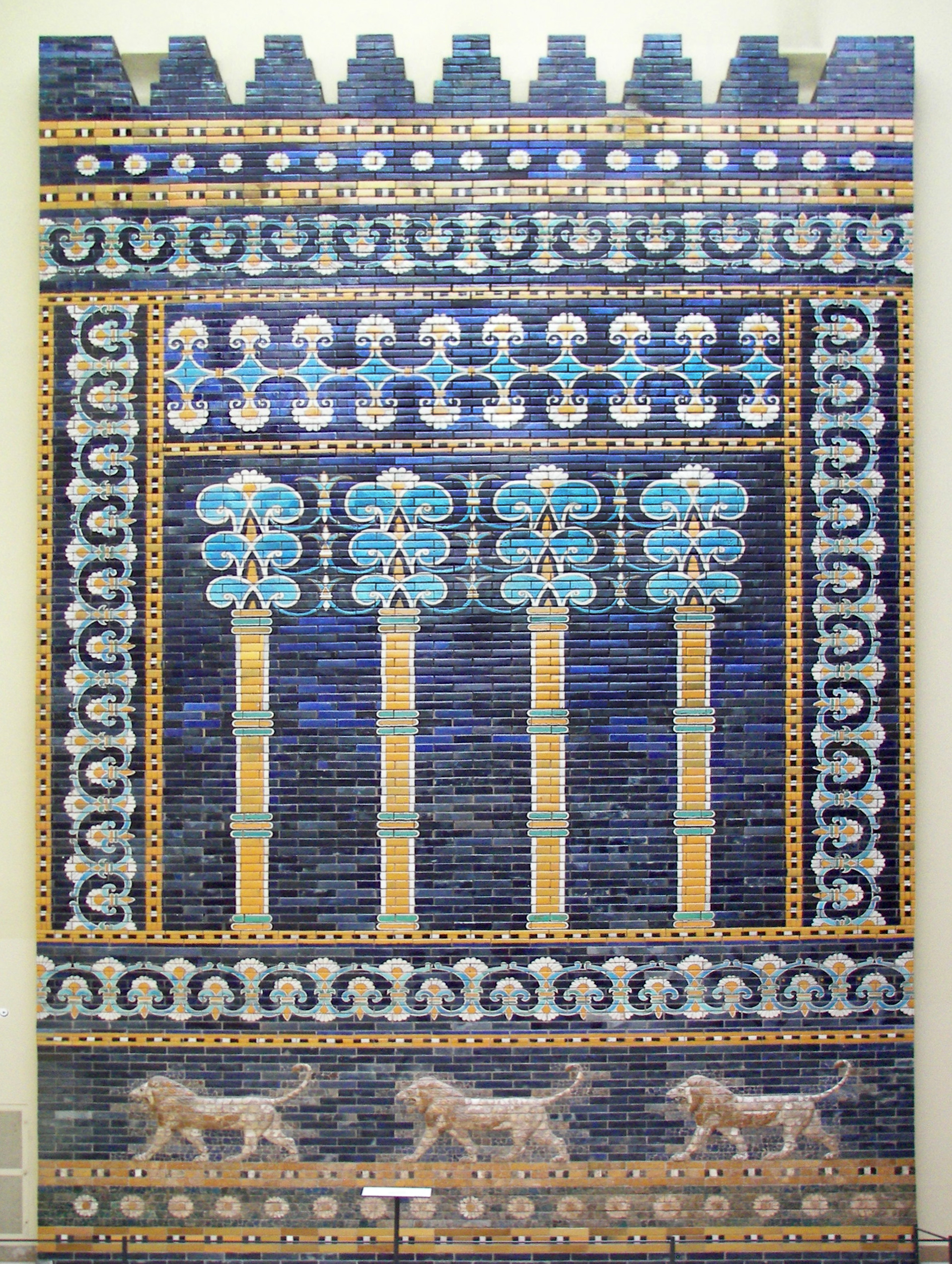
Facade of the Throne Room. Babylon, coloured, glazed bricks. 604-562 BC. The Throne-Room was situated in the third courtyard complex of the royal palace.

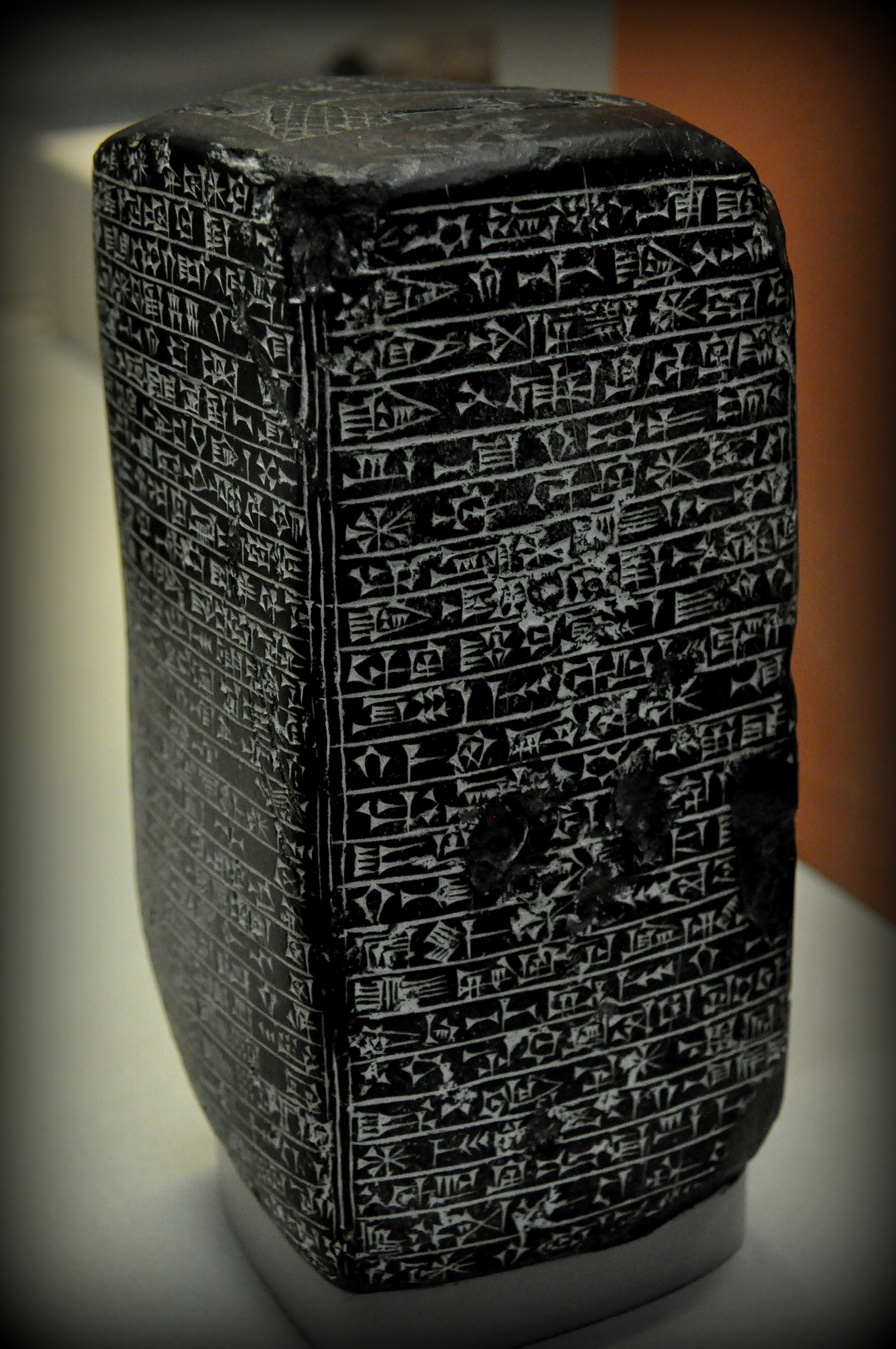
Black basalt monument of king Esarhaddon. It narrates Esarhaddon's restoration of Babylon. Circa 670 BC.

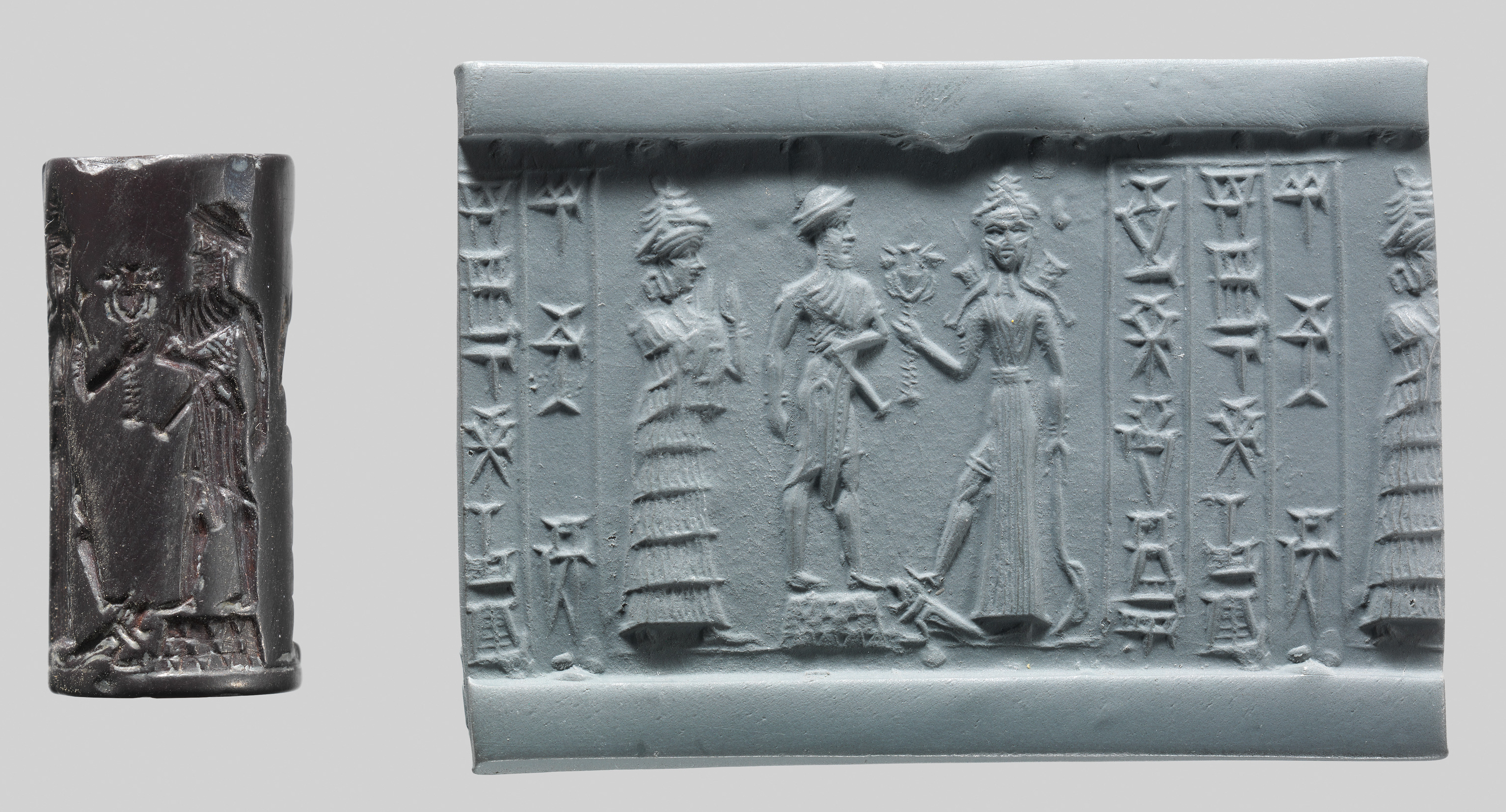
Cylinder seal with an impression; circa 18th–17th century BC; hematite; 2.39 cm; Metropolitan Museum of Art

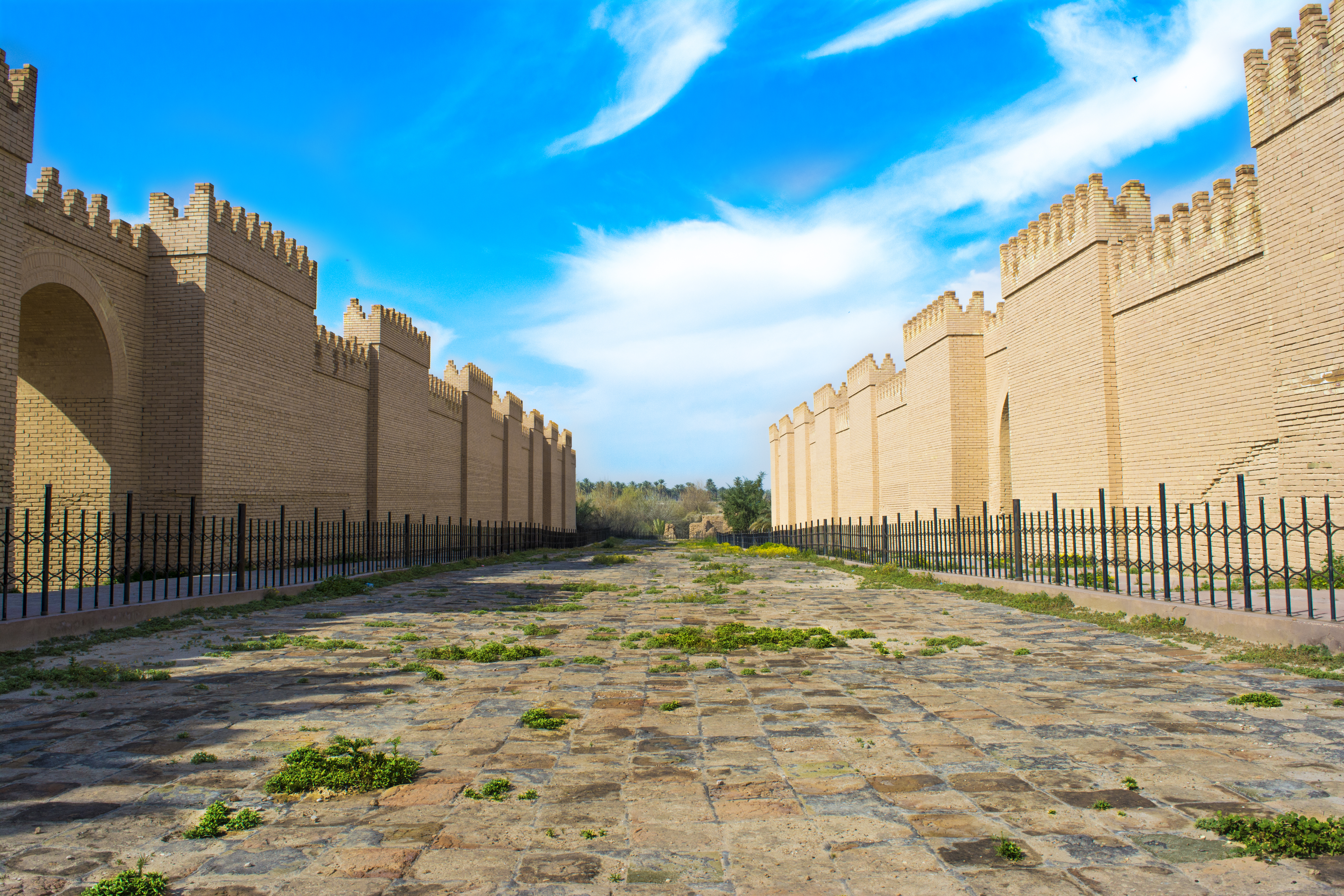
A partial view of the ruins of Babylon.

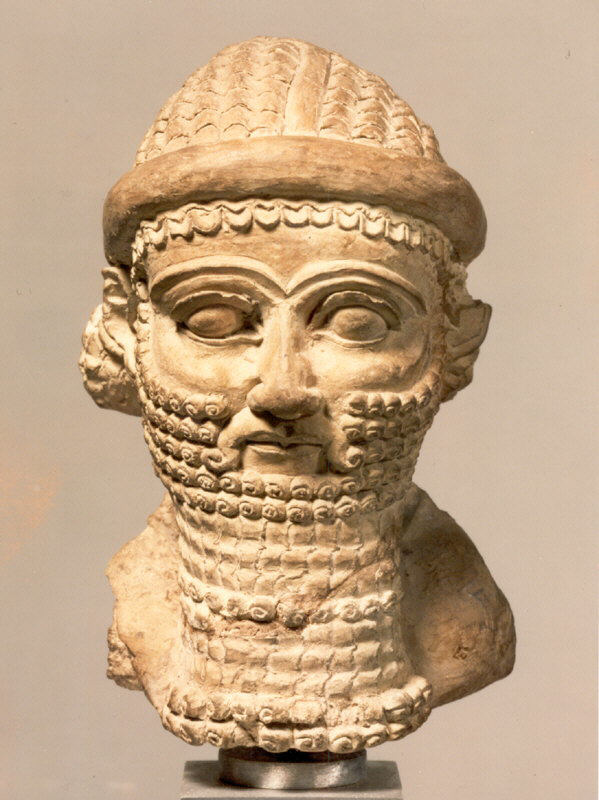
Male head; circa late 8th–early 7th century; ceramic; 12.5 cm; Metropolitan Museum of Art

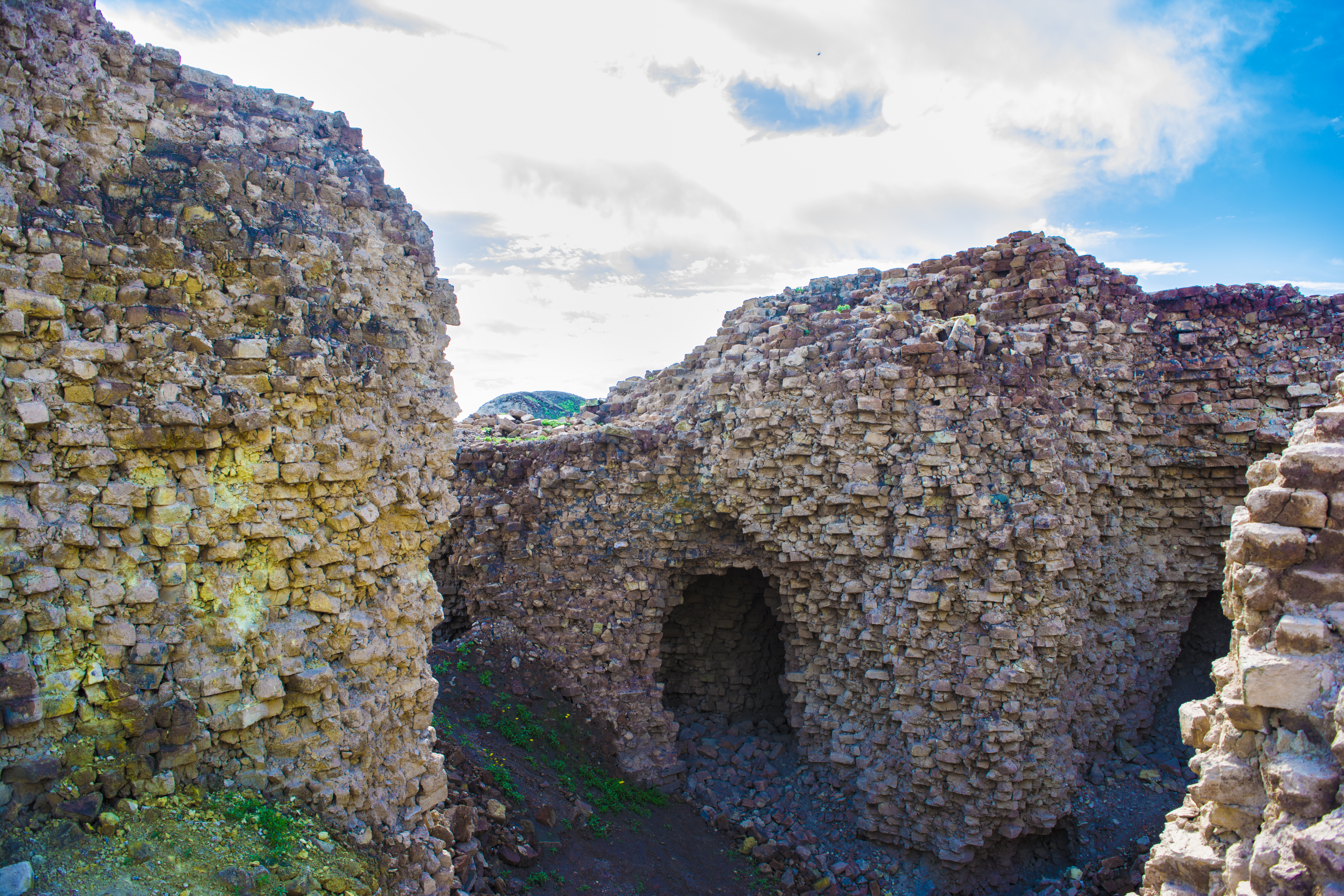
Remains of brick structures in Babylon

== Characteristics ==
The central place of worship was the ziggurat, a stepped pyramid with stairs leading to an altar where worshipers would elevate themselves closer to the heavens.

Sculptures, mostly rather small, are the main surviving artworks. In the late period Assyrian sculpture for palaces was often very large. Most of the Sumerian and Akkadian statues of figures are in a position of prayer. The main types of stone used are limestone and alabaster.

Zainab Bahrani said that visual art in Babylonia and Assyria was not intended to simply imitate or replicate reality, the goal was to produce a representation that acted as a stand-in or substitute for the real thing. This representation was then perceived as part of actual reality.

== Architecture ==
Ancient Mesopotamia is most noted for its construction of mud brick buildings and the construction of ziggurats, occupying a prominent place in each city and consisting of an artificial mound, often rising in huge steps, surmounted by a temple. The mound was no doubt to elevate the temple to a commanding position in what was otherwise a flat river valley. The great city of Uruk had a number of religious precincts, containing many temples larger and more ambitious than any buildings previously known.

The word ziggurat is an anglicized form of the Akkadian word ziqqurratum, the name given to the solid stepped towers of mud brick. It derives from the verb zaqaru, ("to be high"). The buildings are described as being like mountains linking Earth and heaven. The Ziggurat of Ur, excavated by Leonard Woolley, is 64 by 46 meters at base and originally some 12 meters in height with three stories. It was built under Ur-Nammu (circa 2100 B.C.) and rebuilt under Nabonidus (556–539 B.C.), when it was increased in height to probably seven stories.

Assyrian palaces had a large public court with a suite of apartments on the east side and a series of large banqueting halls on the south side. This was to become the traditional plan of Assyrian palaces, built and adorned for the glorification of the king. Massive amounts of ivory furniture pieces were found in some palaces.

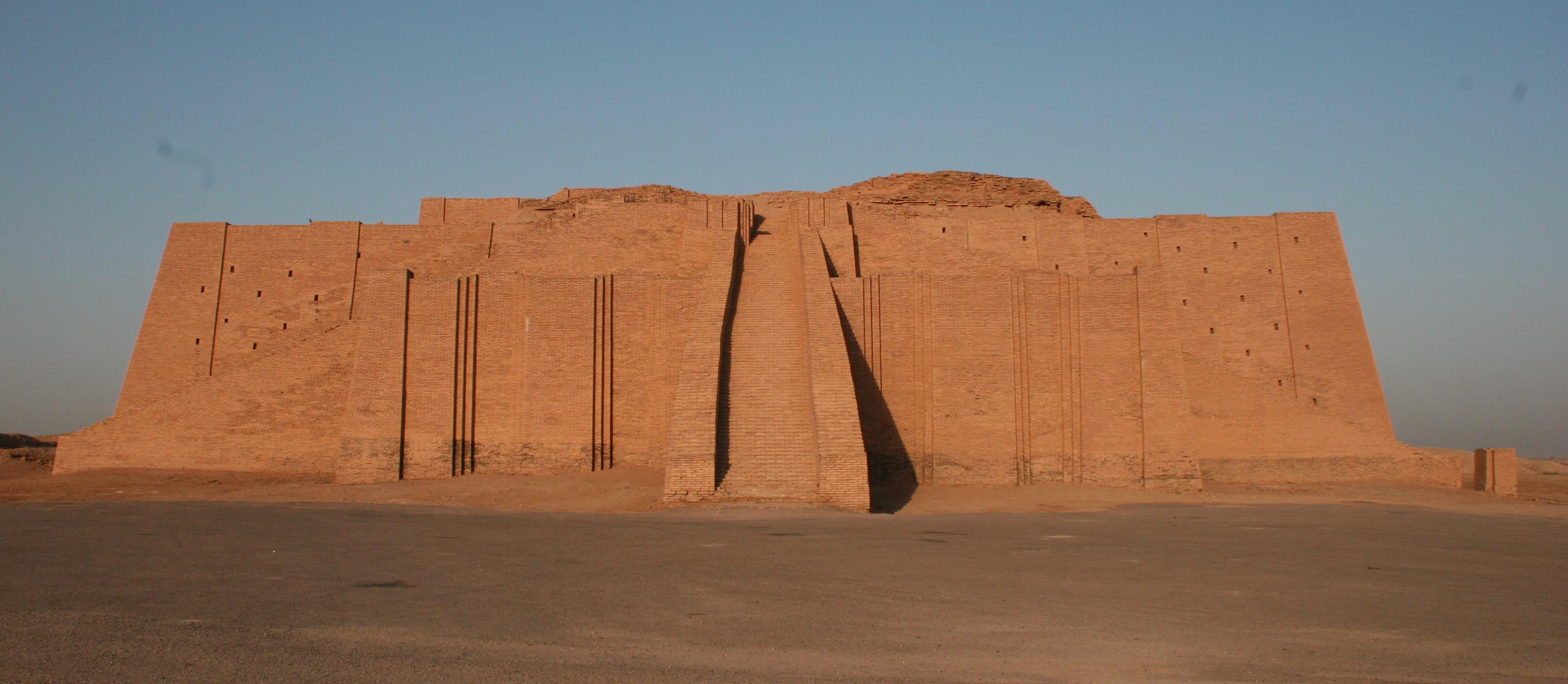
The Ziggurat of Ur, approximately 21st century BC, Ur)

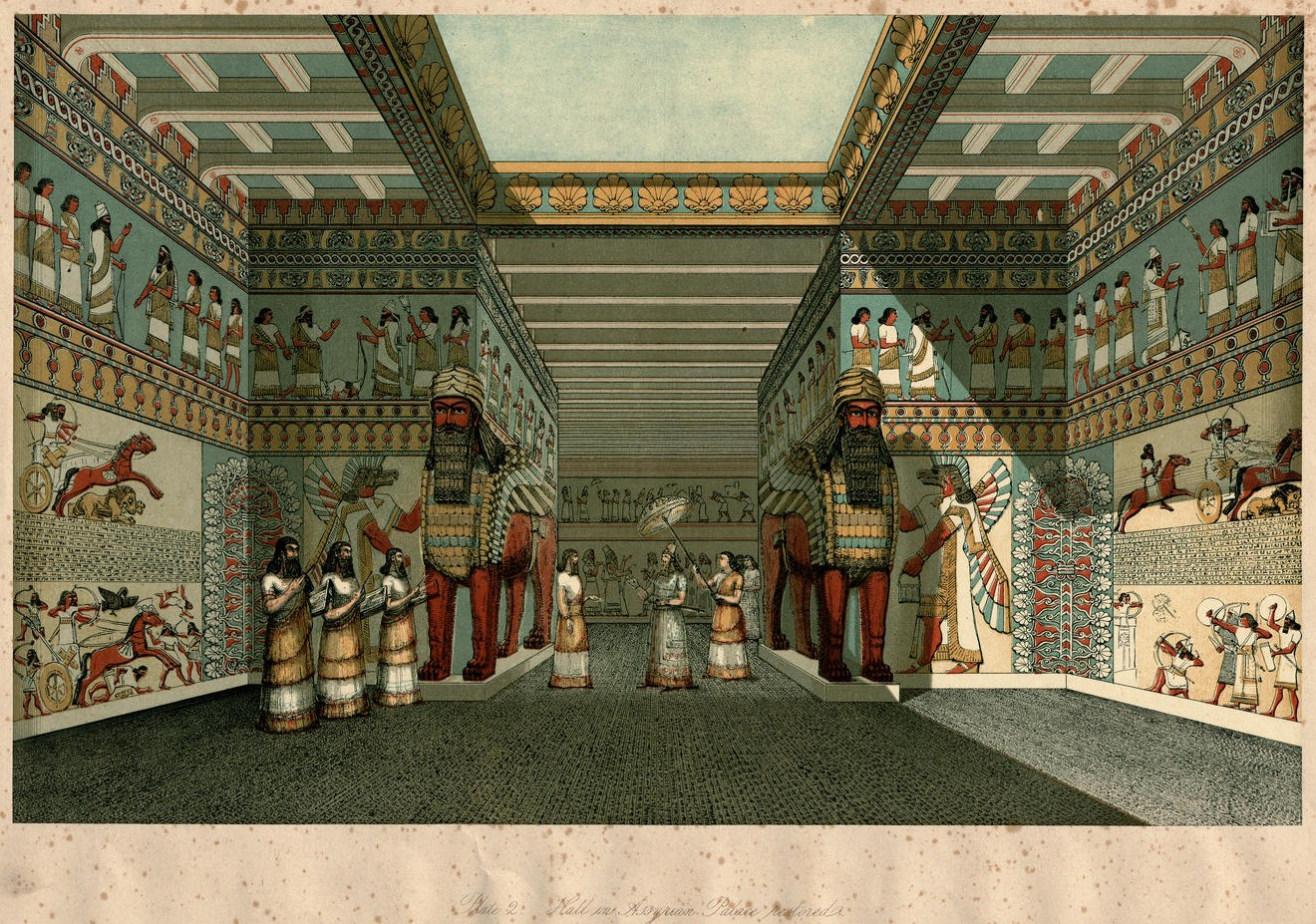
Illustration of a hall in the Assyrian Palace of Ashurnasrirpal II by Austen Henry Layard (1854)

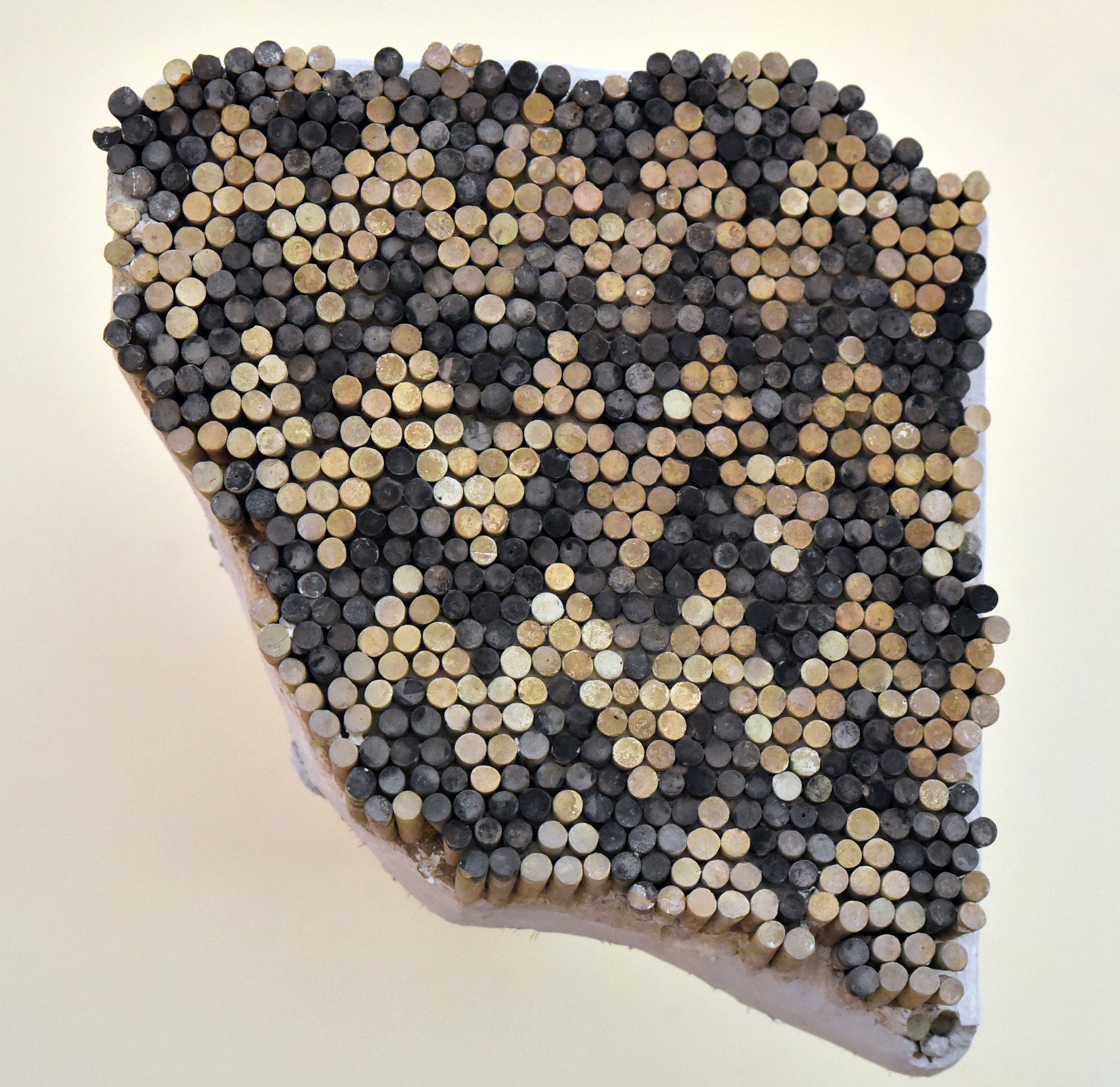
Mosaic panel (using stone cones) decorating a wall of one of the temple at the city of Warka (Uruk), Iraq. 2nd half of the 4th millennium BC. Iraq Museum

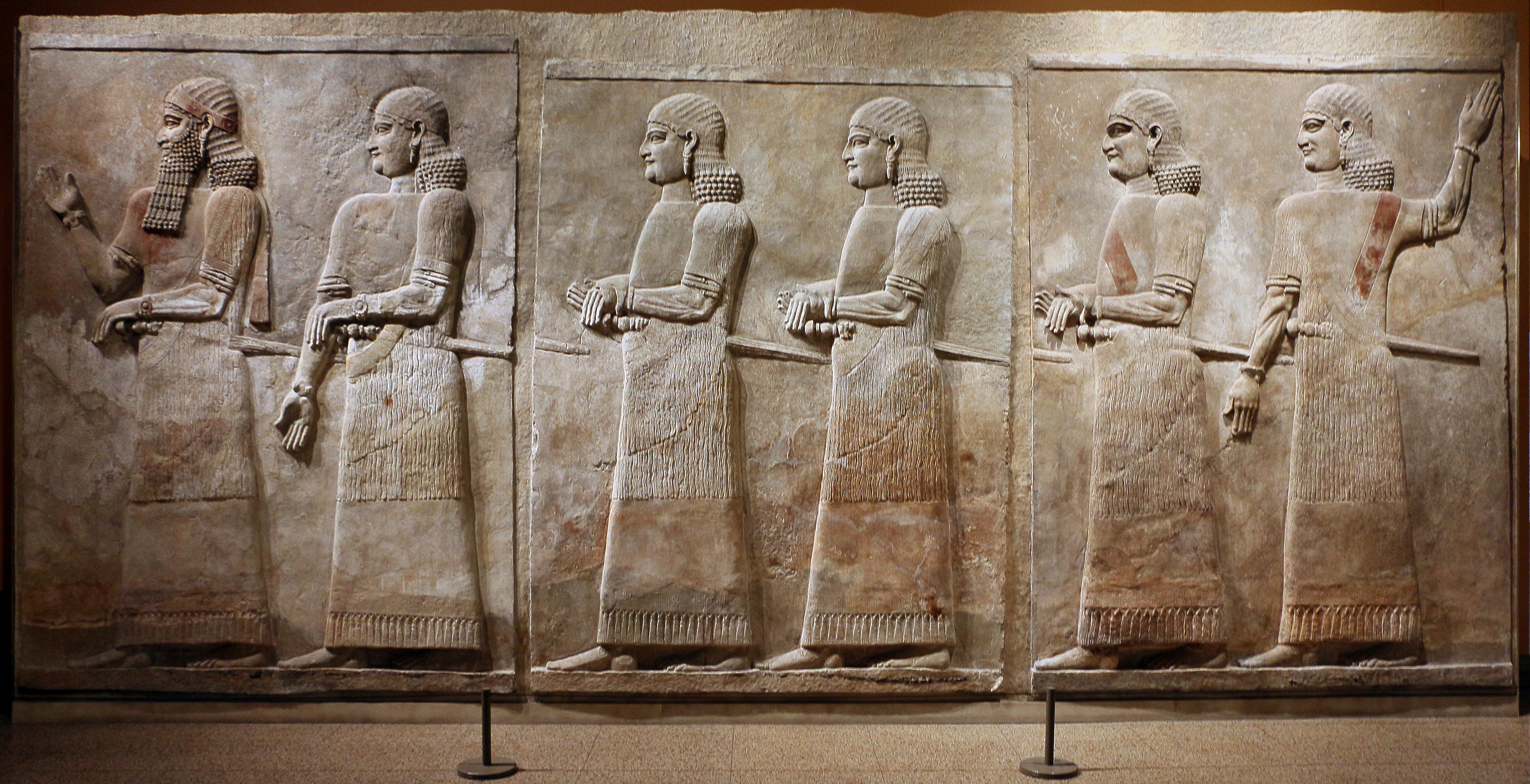
Assyrian reliefs from the Palace of Sargon II in Khorsabad, 721-705 BC, Oriental Institute Museum (Chicago, USA)

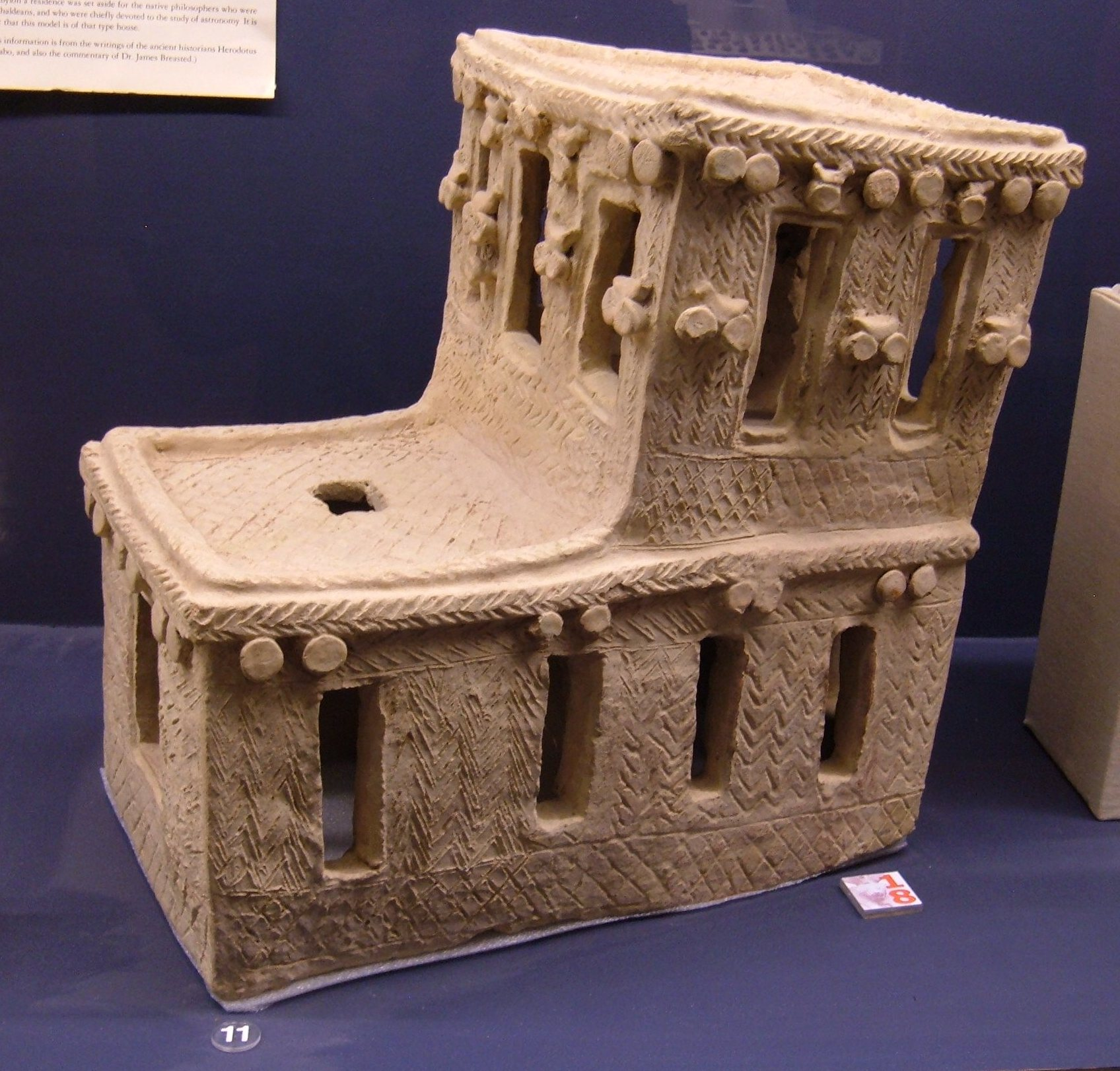
Terracotta model of a house from Babylon, 2600 BC

== Jewellery ==
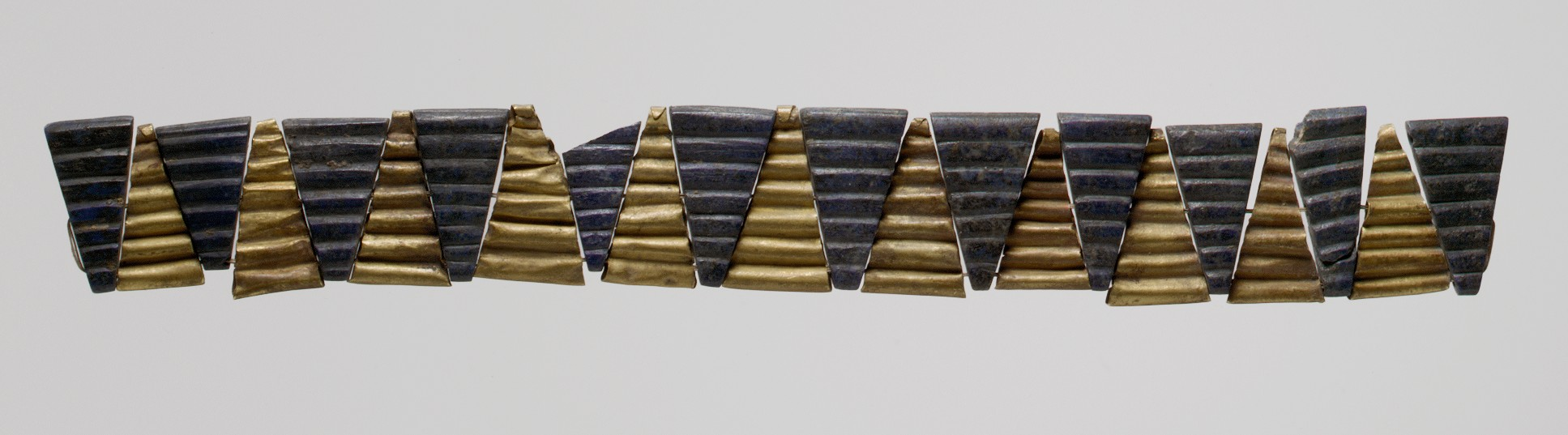
Necklace; 2600–2500 BC; gold and lapis lazuli; length: 22.5 cm; Royal Cemetery at Ur, Iraq

The preferred jewellery designs used in Mesopotamia were natural and geometric motifs such as leaves, cones, spirals, and bunches of grapes. Sumerian and Akkadian jewellery was created from gold and silver leaf and set with many semiprecious stones (mostly agate, carnelian, jasper, lapis lazuli and chalcedony). A number of documents have been found that relate to the trade and production of jewellery from Sumerian sites.

Later Mesopotamian jewellers and craftsmen employed metalworking techniques such as cloisonné, engraving, granulation, and filigree. The large variety and size of necklaces, bracelets, anklets, pendants, and pins found may be due to the fact that jewellery was worn by both men and women, and perhaps even children.

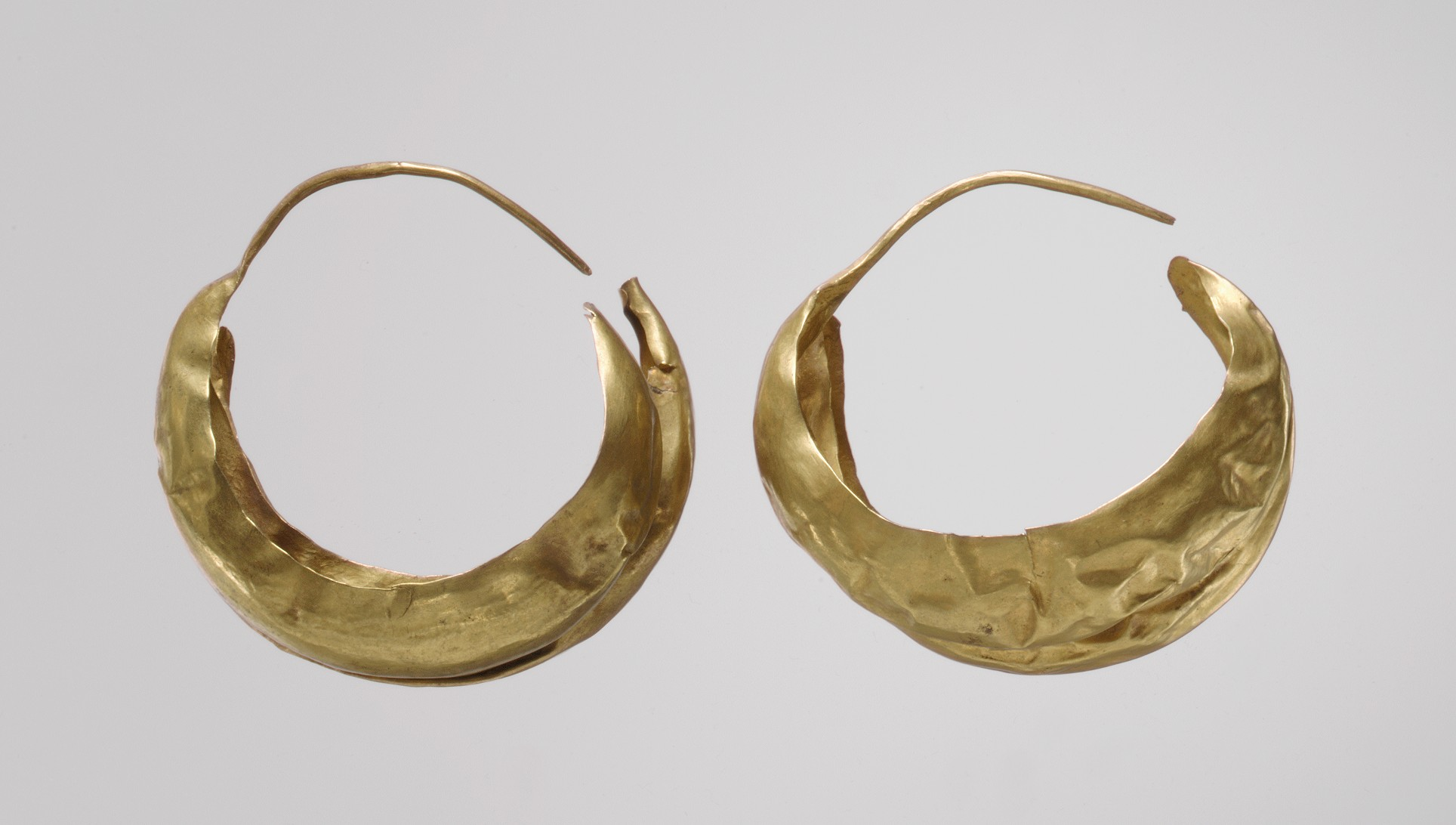
Pair of earrings; 2600–2500 BC; gold; Metropolitan Museum of Art

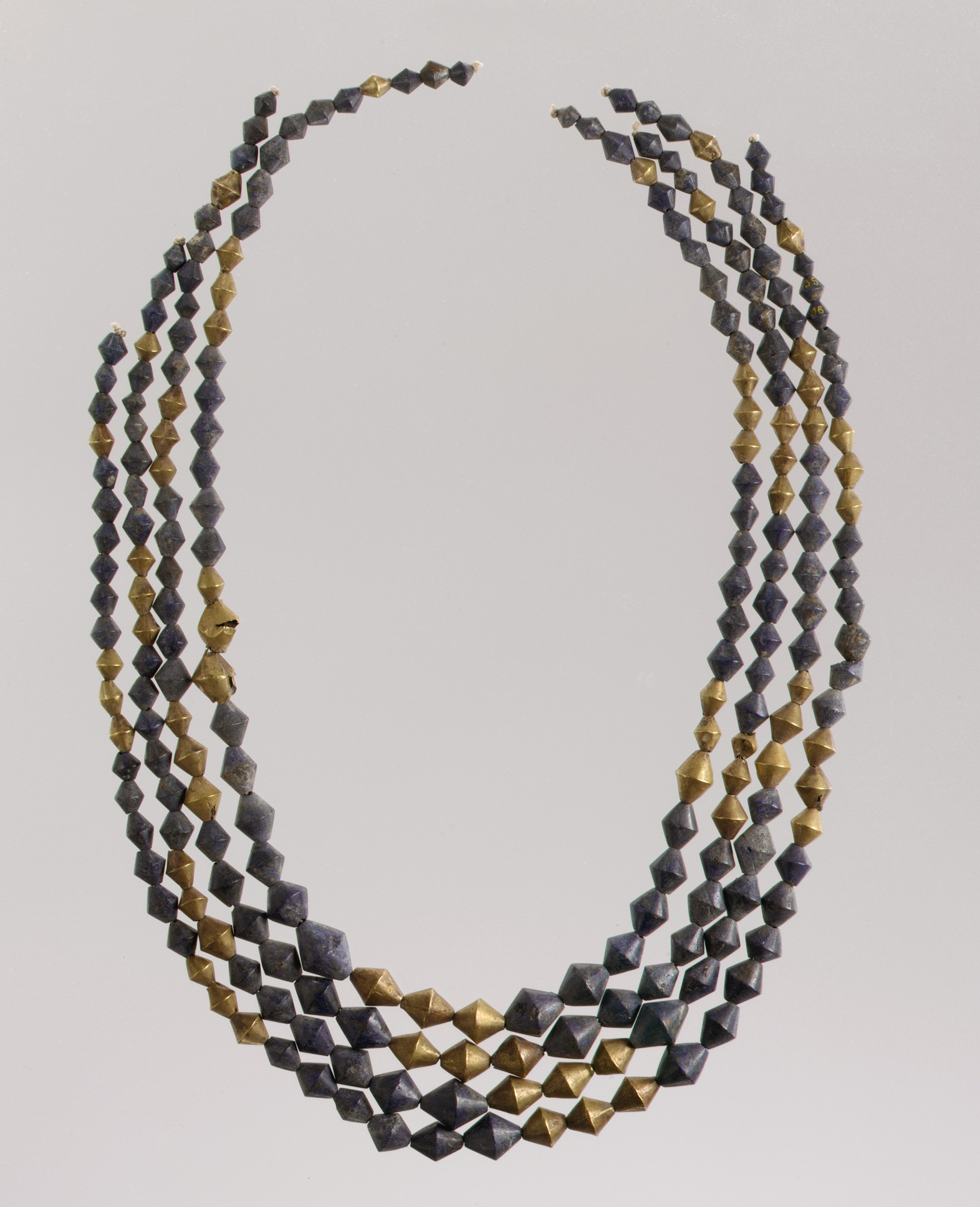
Necklace beads; 2600–2500 BC; gold and lapis lazuli; length: 54 cm; Metropolitan Museum of Art

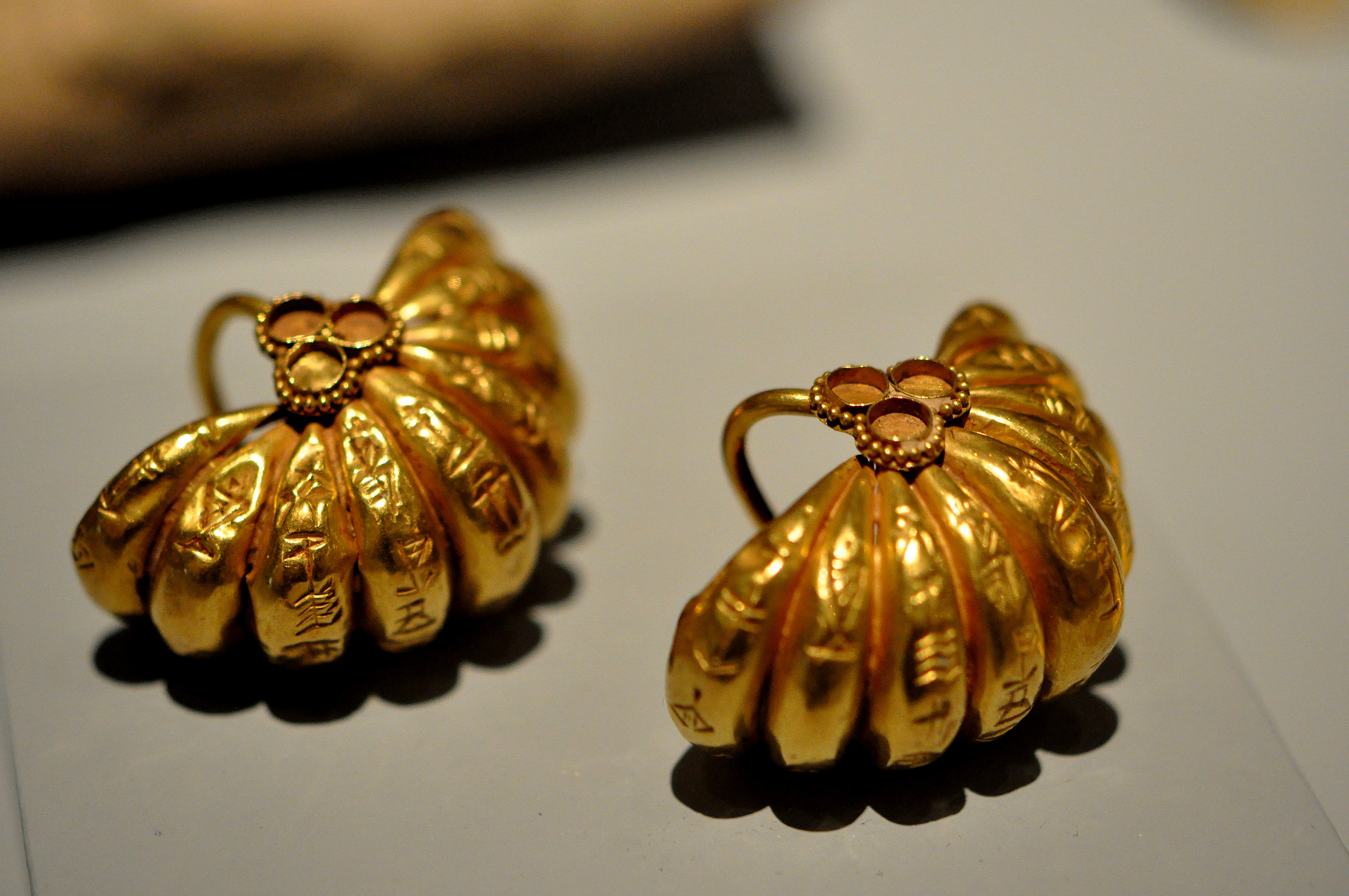
Pair of earrings with cuneiform inscriptions, 2093–2046 BC; gold; Sulaymaniyah Museum (Sulaymaniyah, Iraq)

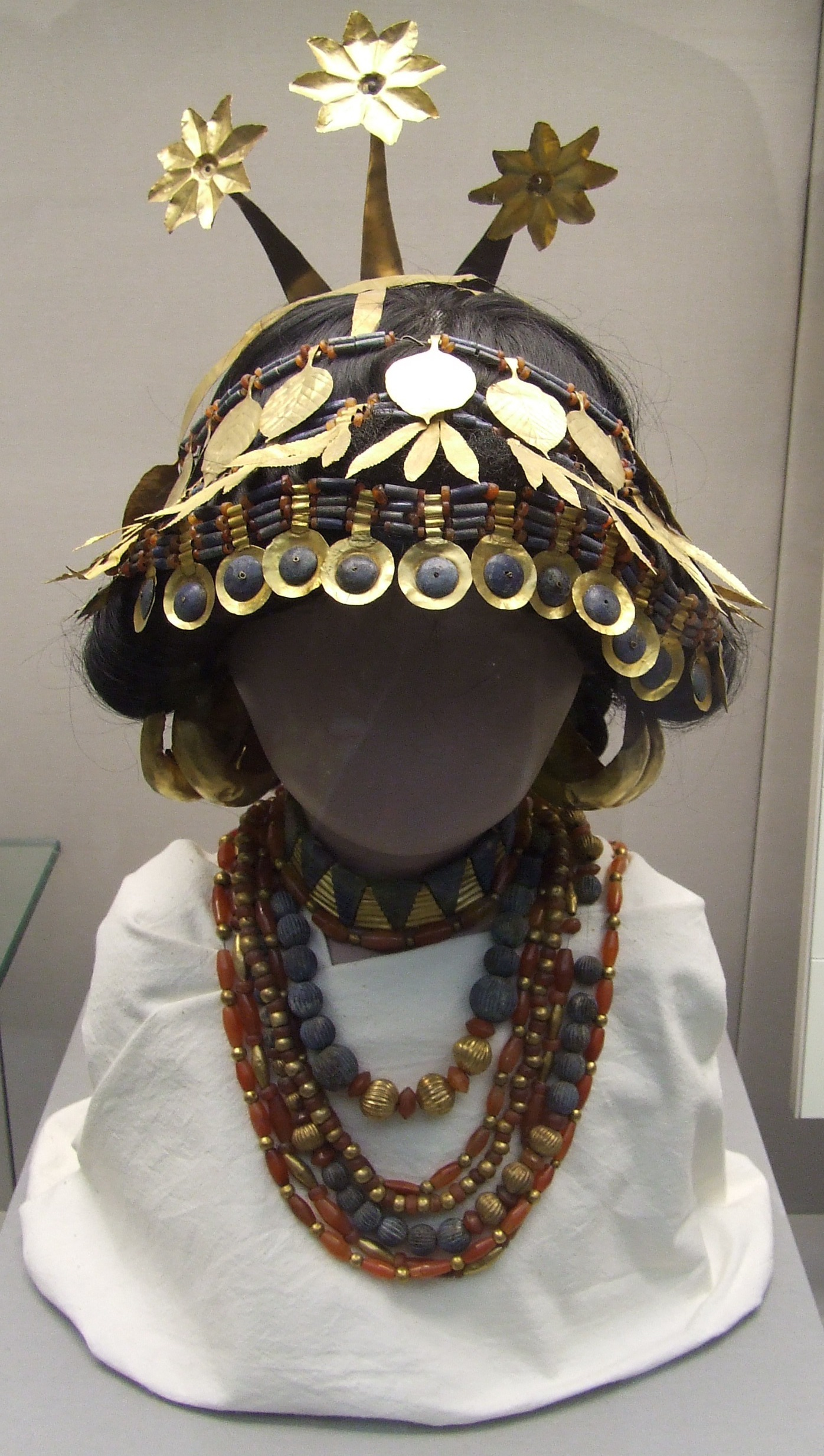
Sumerian necklaces and headgear discovered in the royal (and individual) graves of the Royal Cemetery at Ur, showing the way they may have been worn, in British Museum (London)

== Collections ==
Important collections include the Louvre Museum, the Vorderasiatisches Museum (Berlin, Germany), the British Museum (London), the Metropolitan Museum of Art (New York City), and the National Museum of Iraq (Baghdad). The last was extensively looted after the breakdown of law and order following the 2003 invasion of Iraq, but the most important objects have largely been recovered.

Several other museums have good collections, especially of the very numerous cylinder seals. Syrian museums have important collections from sites in modern Syria. Other museums with important collections of Mesopotamian art are: the Oriental Institute of Chicago, İstanbul Archaeology Museums (Istanbul, Turkey), University of Pennsylvania Museum of Archaeology and Anthropology, Rijksmuseum van Oudheden (Leiden, the Netherlands) and the Israel Museum (Jerusalem). The reconstructed Ishtar Gate is in the Pergamon Museum in Berlin.

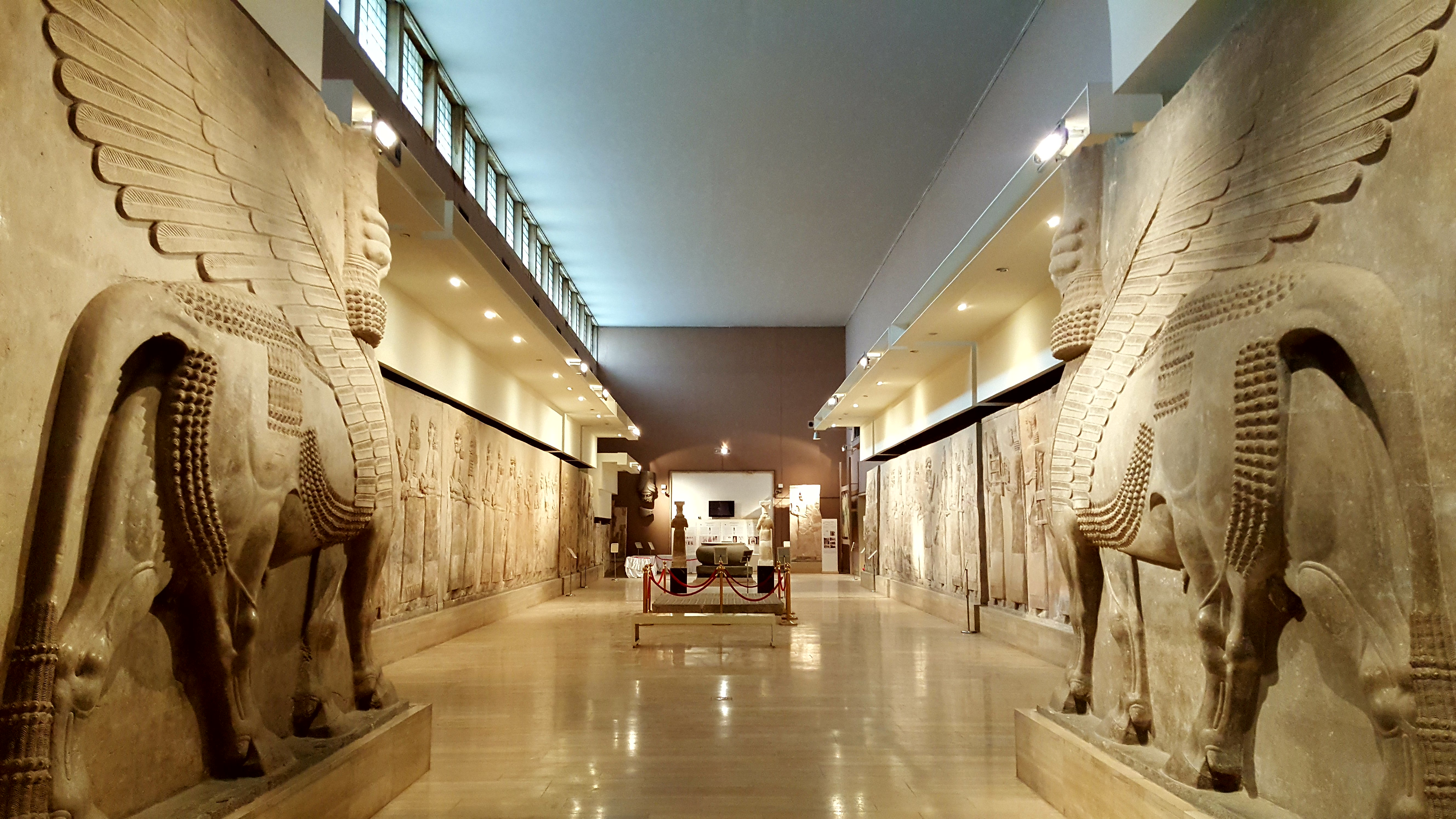
The Assyrian gallery at the Iraq Museum, Baghdad

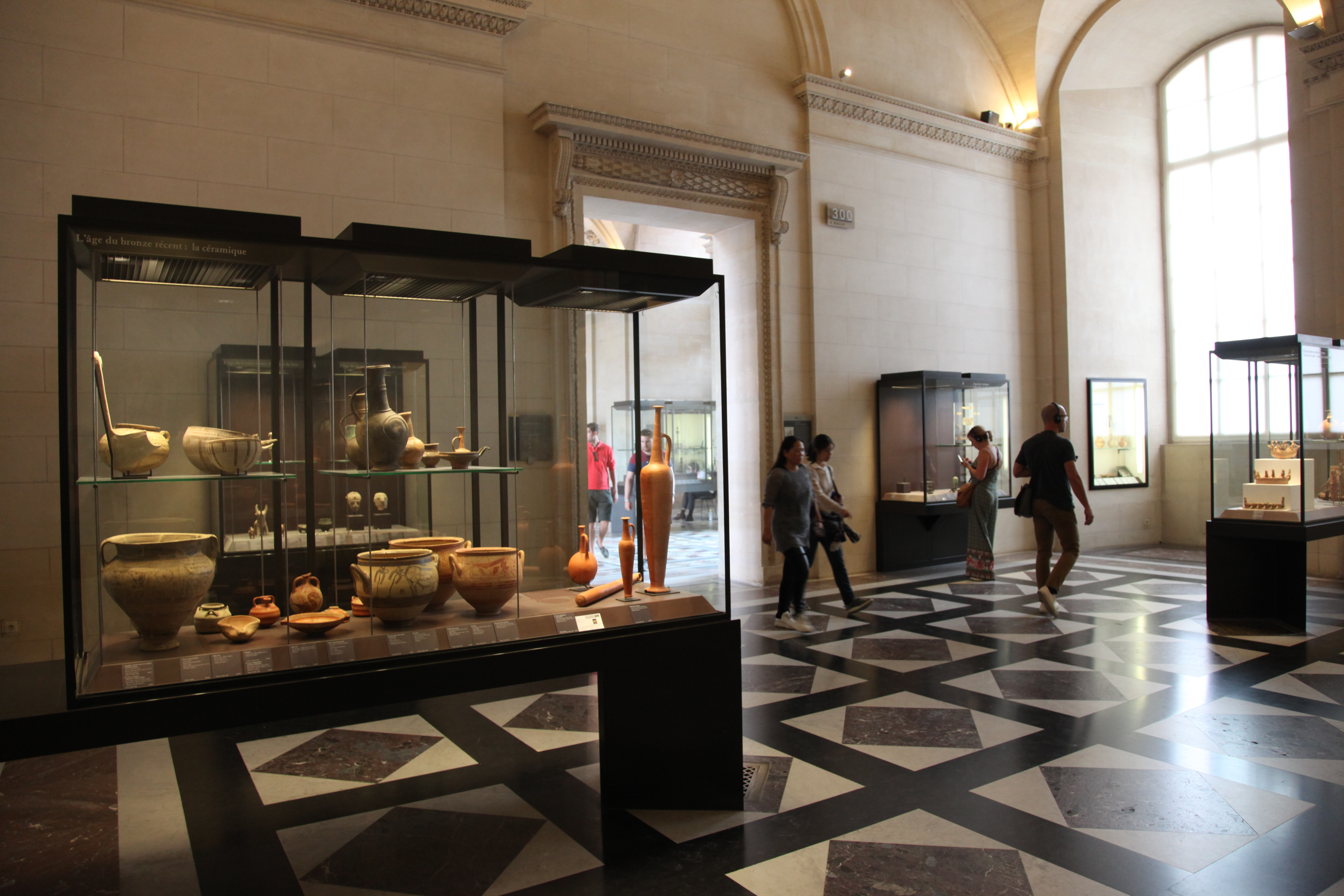
A room with Mesopotamian art, from the Louvre

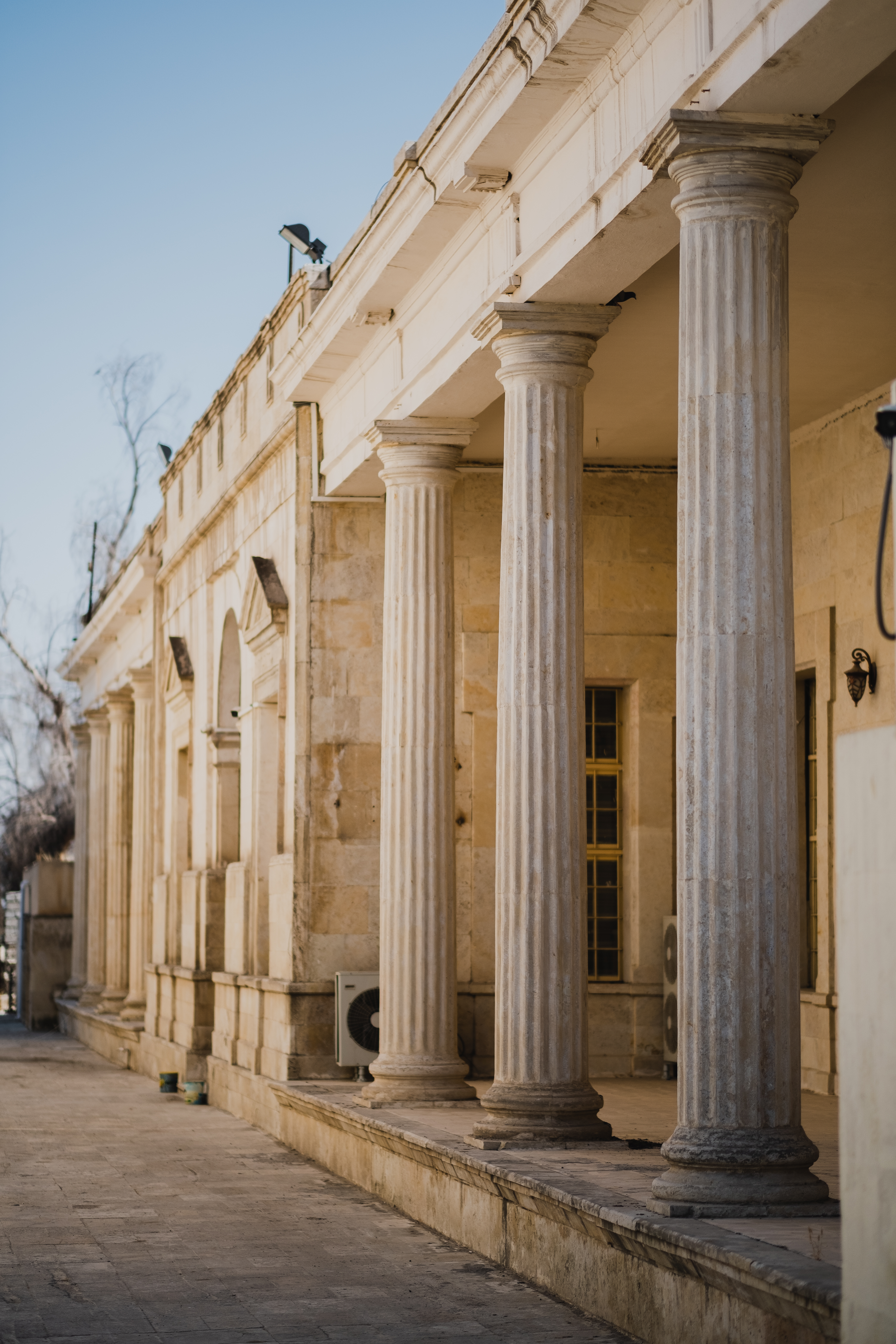
Mosul Museum

== See also ==
- Iraqi art
- Architecture of Mesopotamia
- Ancient Mesopotamian religion
- Representation in Babylonia and Assyria by Zainab Bahrani
