= Art of Uruk =

One of the arts of the city of Uruk, southern Iraq

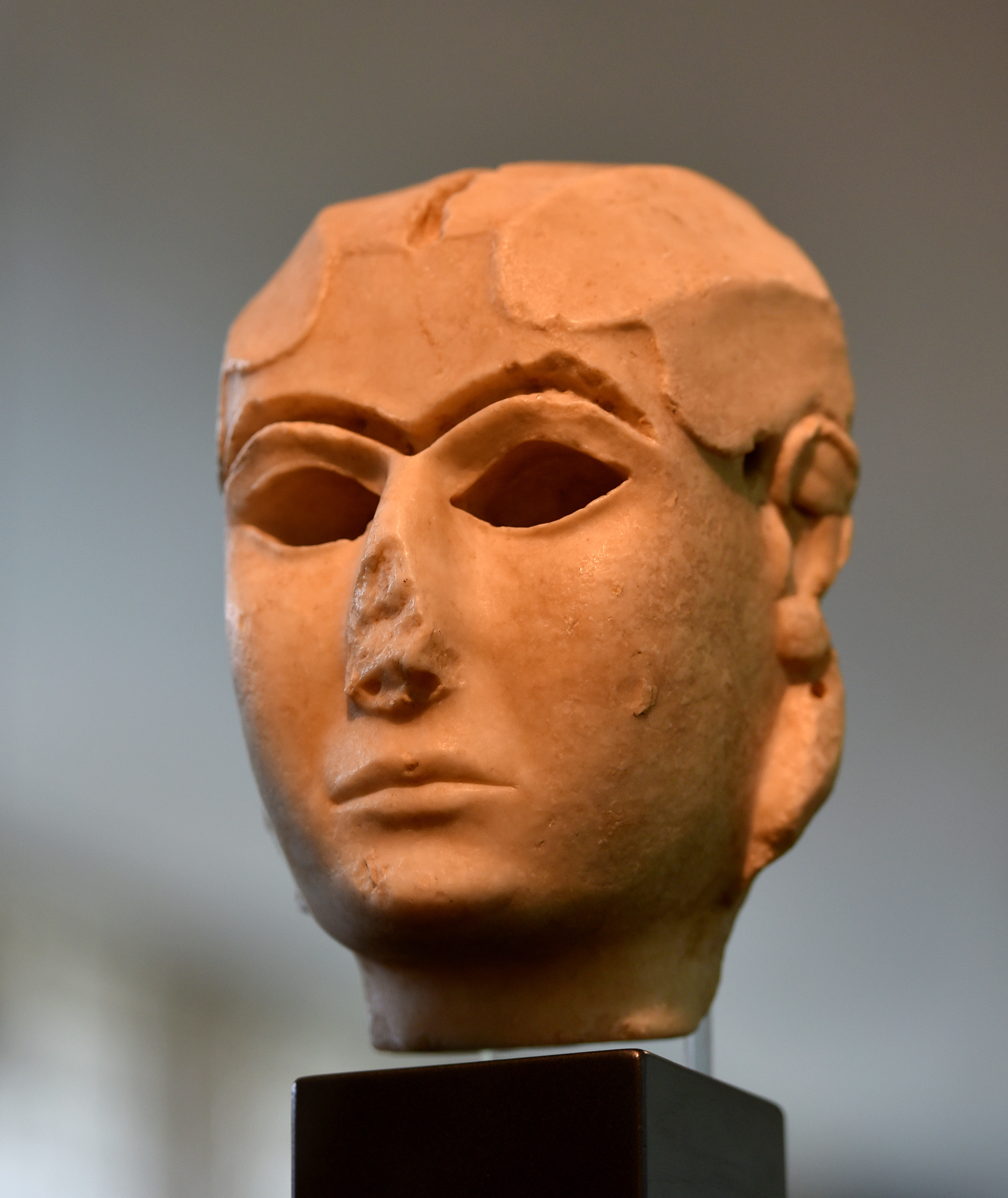
Mask of Warka, or Head of Inanna, found at Uruk, c. 3100 BCE

The art of Uruk encompasses the sculptures, seals, pottery, architecture, and other arts produced in Uruk, an ancient city in southern Mesopotamia that thrived during the Uruk period around 4200-3000 BCE. The city continued to develop into the Early Dynastic Period (Mesopotamia) around 2900-2350 BCE. Considered one of the first cities, the site of Uruk – modern-day Warka in Iraq – shows evidence of social stratification, institutionalized religion, a centralized administration, and what art historians would categorize as high art and architecture, the first in the long history of the art of Mesopotamia. Much of the art of Uruk shows a high technical skill and was often made using precious materials.

== Sculpture ==
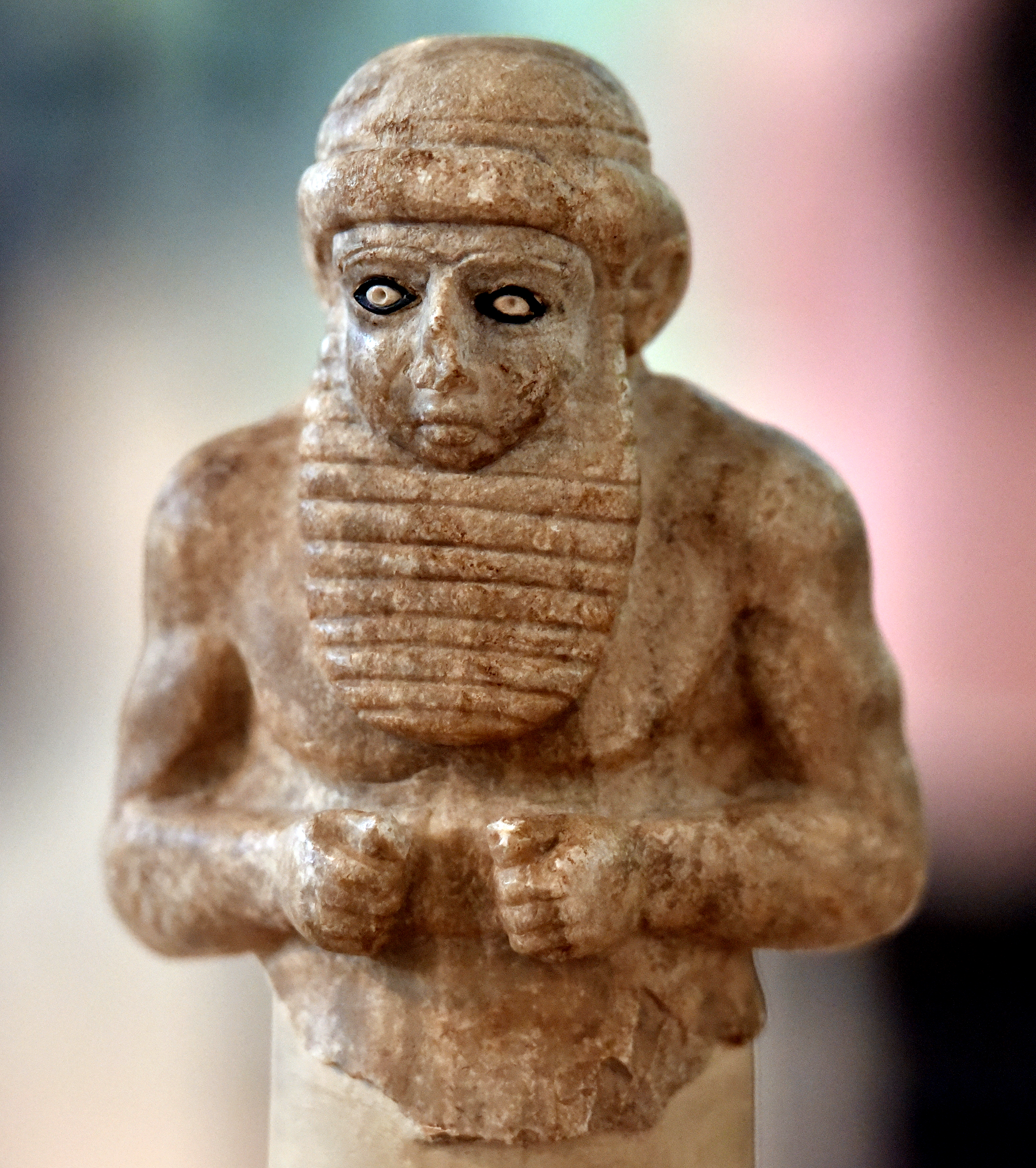
Sumerian dignitary, Uruk, circa 3300-3000 BCE. National Museum of Iraq.

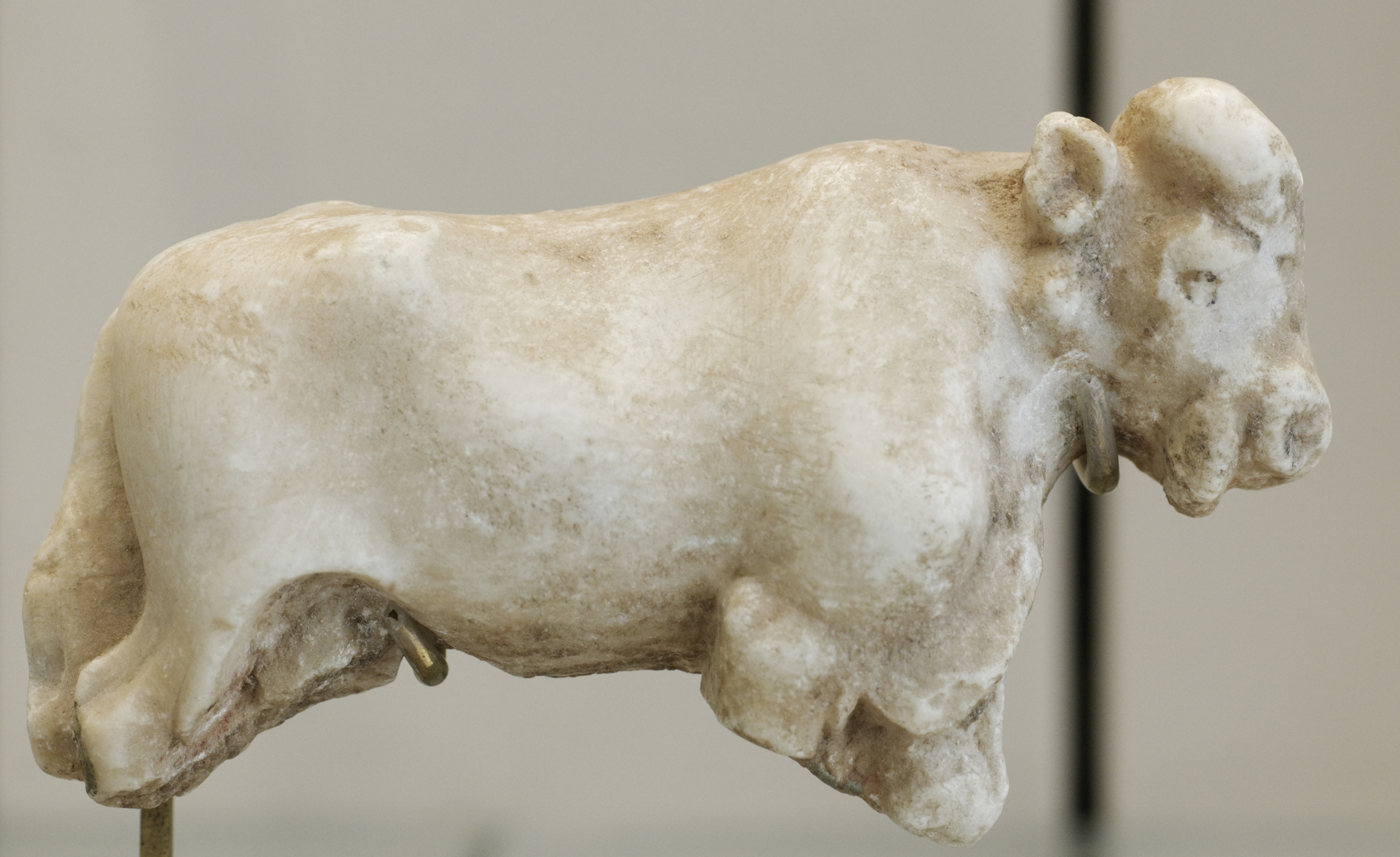
Fragment of a Bull Figurine from Uruk, c. 3000 BCE

Votive sculptures in the form of small animal figurines have been found at Uruk, using a style mixing naturalistic and abstract elements in order to capture the spiritual essence of the animal, rather than depicting an entirely anatomically accurate figure. The use of animal figures as votive offerings as opposed to human figures probably replaces a ritual act of animal sacrifice and makes it eternal by leaving the image of the sacrificed animal in the temple. Many of these animal votives were discovered at Uruk Level III (c. 3000 BCE) and would have been offered to the goddess Inanna in return for her favor.

A group of objects dubbed Kleinfunde or "small finds" by excavators was also discovered in Uruk. The collection of small objects consisted of animal figures inlaid with stone, and vessels that would have been used for rituals in the temple but had since gone out of use and were subsequently buried in sacred ground rather than discarded unceremoniously. Similar animal figures could have been used as amulets or cylinder seal handles.

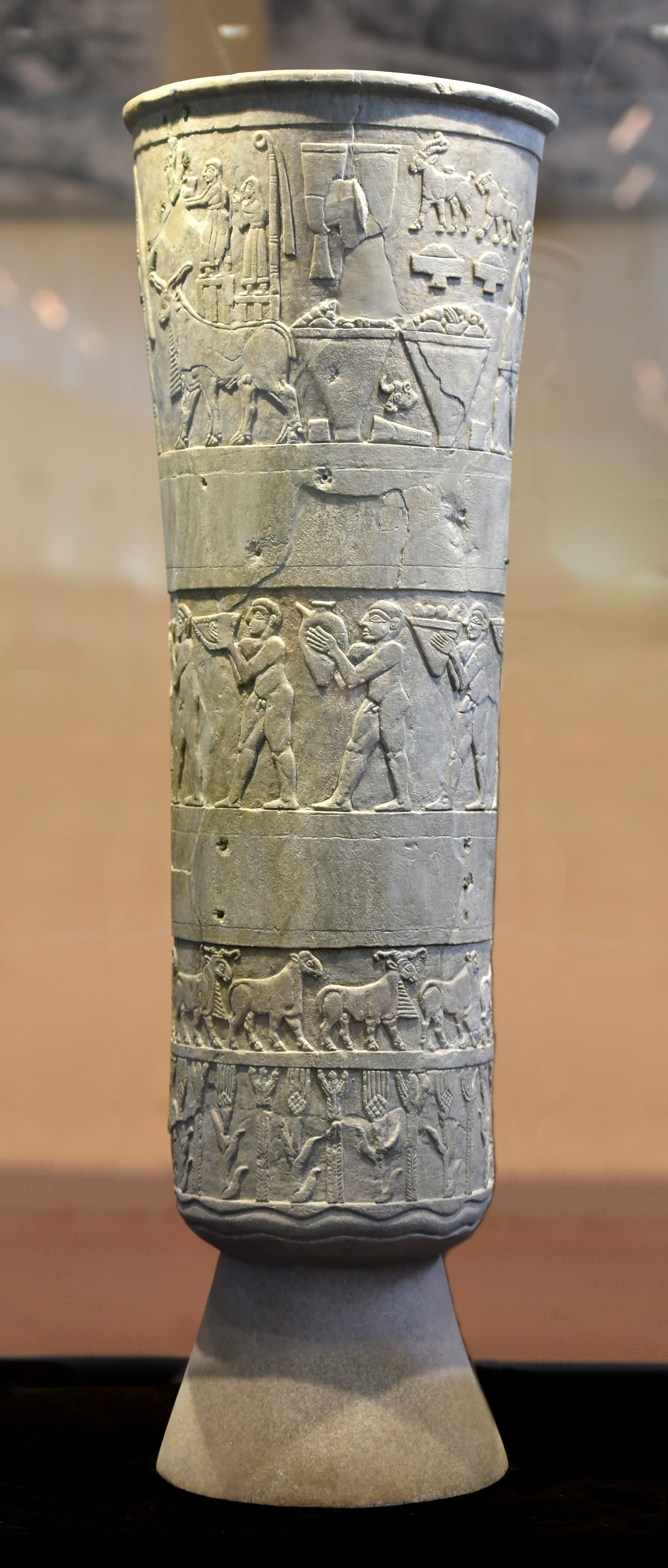
Warka Vase in the National Museum of Iraq.

=== Narrative art ===
Uruk is also the find place of two of the oldest examples of narrative art, the Uruk Trough and the Warka Vase. Though it could not have functioned as a basin, the limestone Uruk Trough could have functioned as a cult image in the temple of Inanna and shows flocks of sheep carved in relief approaching a reed hut with lambs coming out of the structure. According to the British Museum where this object is held, the scene with sheep could represent the fertility of the flock while it is under Inanna's protection, although the "animals emerging from a hut" motif could also be associated with agricultural practice where shepherds would separate ewes and lambs during the day to help conserve the ewe's milk.

The Uruk or Warka Vase depicts a religious banquet, probably associated with an agricultural festival, that is connected to rituals involving the goddess Inanna. The vase is divided into four registers: the bottom register depicts water, plants, and ears of wheat; the second depicts right-facing sheep; the third depicts left-facing nude priests with offering vessels; and the fourth and top register depicts a “priest-king” (damaged) and attendant moving right to approach Inanna herself, who can be identified by the two reed gateposts leading into her temple filled with offerings behind her. This order of registers from bottom to top could reflect the social hierarchy and loosely represent the ranked administration that has been identified in the city of Uruk.

=== Mask of Warka ===
In addition to narrative art, one of the most famous examples of sculpture found at Uruk is the marble head of a goddess, the Mask of Warka or Lady of Warka, which most likely represents Inanna. It was discovered in the Eanna district at Uruk. Dating to circa 3100 BCE, it is probably from one of the earliest known near life-size sculptures. The face of the sculpture was most likely inlaid with precious stones such as lapis lazuli. The head once belonged to a larger composite statue of the goddess, which was most likely made out of wood.

As with the votive animal figurines, the style has abstract elements such as the eyebrows which would have been inlaid with stone, as well as naturalistic elements, such as the soft, rounded cheeks and lips.

== Seals ==
Uruk King-priest feeding the sacred herd

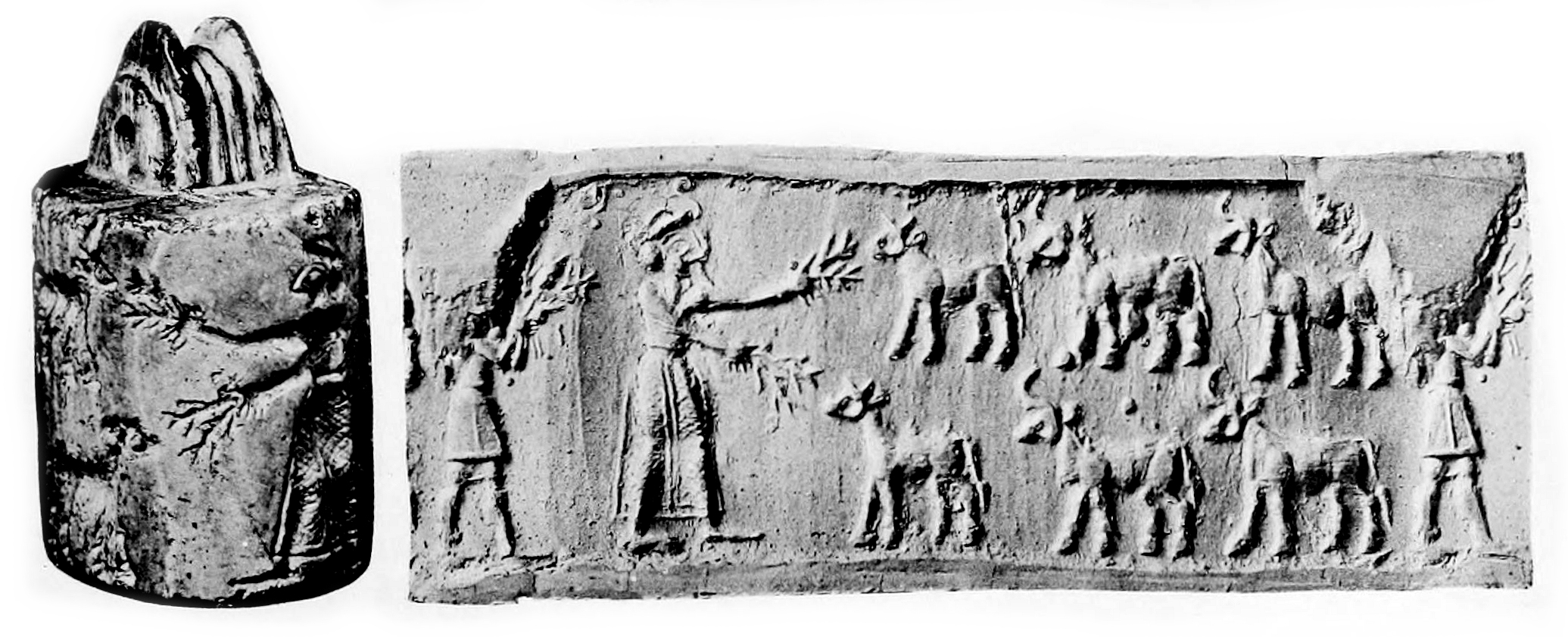
The king-priest and his acolyte feeding the sacred herd. Uruk period, ca. 3200 BCE.

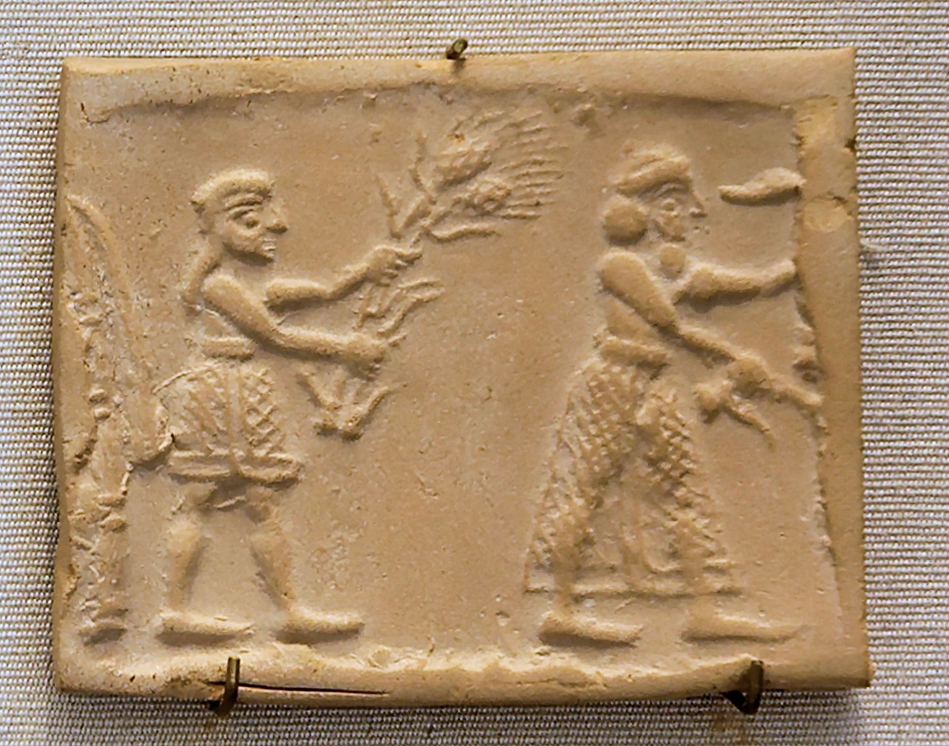
Cylinder-seal of the Uruk period and its impression, c.3100 BCE. Louvre Museum

Beginning in the Middle Uruk period, traditional stamp seals were replaced by cylinder seals. Uruk was the first civilization to make use of cylinder seals, a practice that would eventually permeate the entirety of the ancient Near East, as well as Bronze Age Greece. Cylinder seals were used by individuals and were a marker of one's identity as they acted as a signature and were used for officiating documents. The small objects were cylindrical in shape and were engraved with metal tools. The carving was done in such a way that the seals could be rolled onto clay in order to make an impression. Broken clay seal impressions have been found amongst the same layers of debris on Eanna Level IV where early clay writing tablets have been found. Though many of the recovered cylinder seals used to make such impressions are made of stone, there is also evidence that the people of Uruk used metal over bitumen, shell, and clay to create cylinder seals. The use of stone seals as signatures implies the existence of a complex administrative system in ancient Uruk. The subject matter depicted on the seal varied from kings and livestock to more religious subjects such as symbols of the gods.

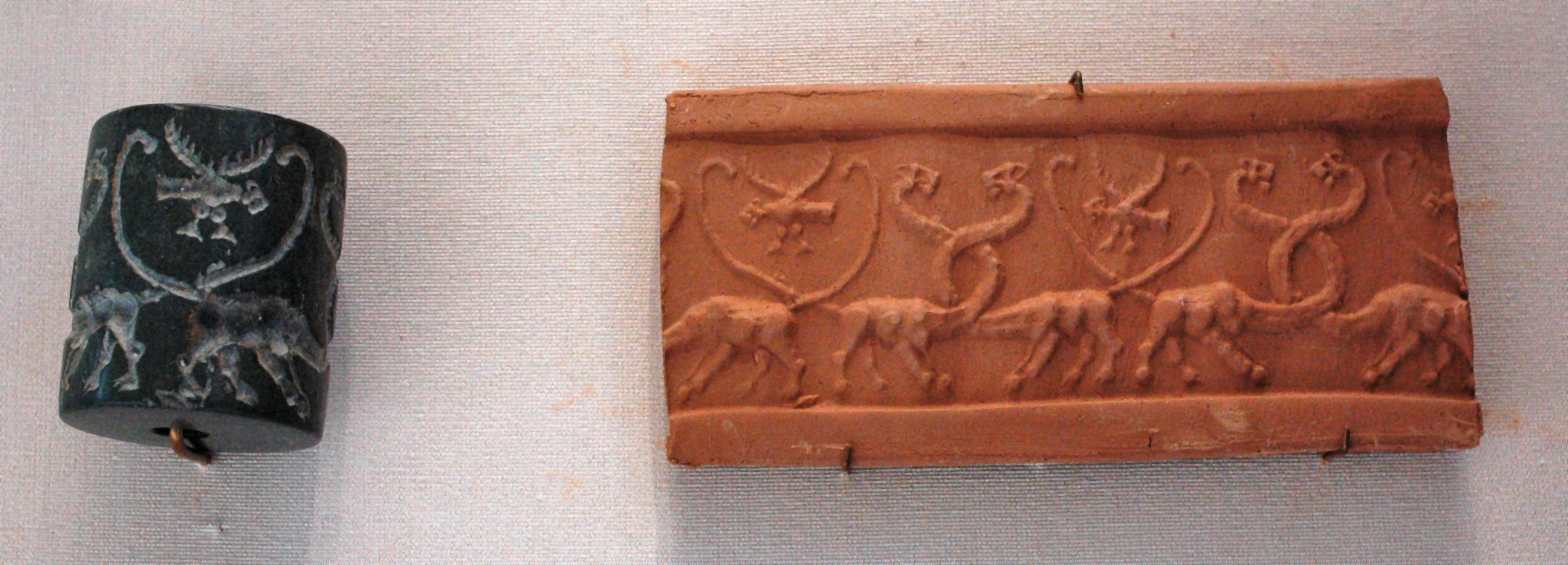
Cylinder seal and seal impression with serpopards and eagles from the Uruk period (4100-3000 BCE)

== Pottery ==
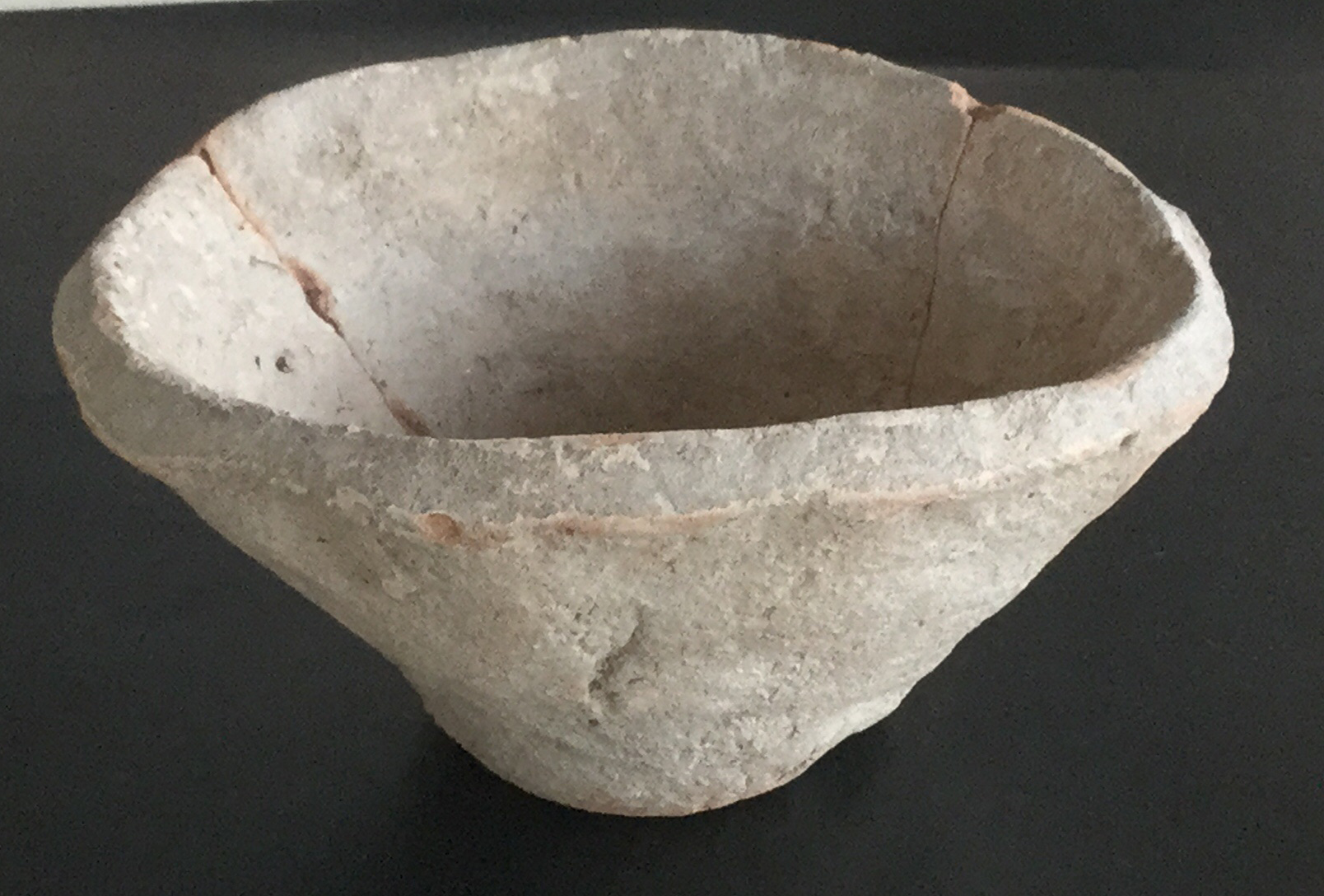
Beveled-rim bowl, c. 3400-3200 BCE

Pottery found at Uruk includes wheel made, hand-made and molded pieces. Potters at Uruk specialized in mass-produced functional vessels. The fast potter's wheel was introduced during the later part of the Uruk period, making it quicker and easier to produce pottery on a massive scale and with a greater sense of standardization. Thousands of beveled rim bowls have been found at the site, and it has been theorized that they were used to measure rations for families or dependant laborers. Another innovation in pottery invented and used by the potters of Uruk is the ceramic ring scraper. As the exportation of ceramics began, the weight of a large vessel became problematic when travelling as a trader. The ring scraper allowed excess, unnecessary material to be scraped from a vessel before firing, making the piece much lighter and easier to carry through town or across the desert. Because of the ability for artists to create pottery on a mass scale, the pottery of Uruk could be distributed to other parts of what is now modern Iraq. Studies have shown that Uruk pottery seemed to be more popular in northern Iraq than it was in southern Iraq.

== Writing ==
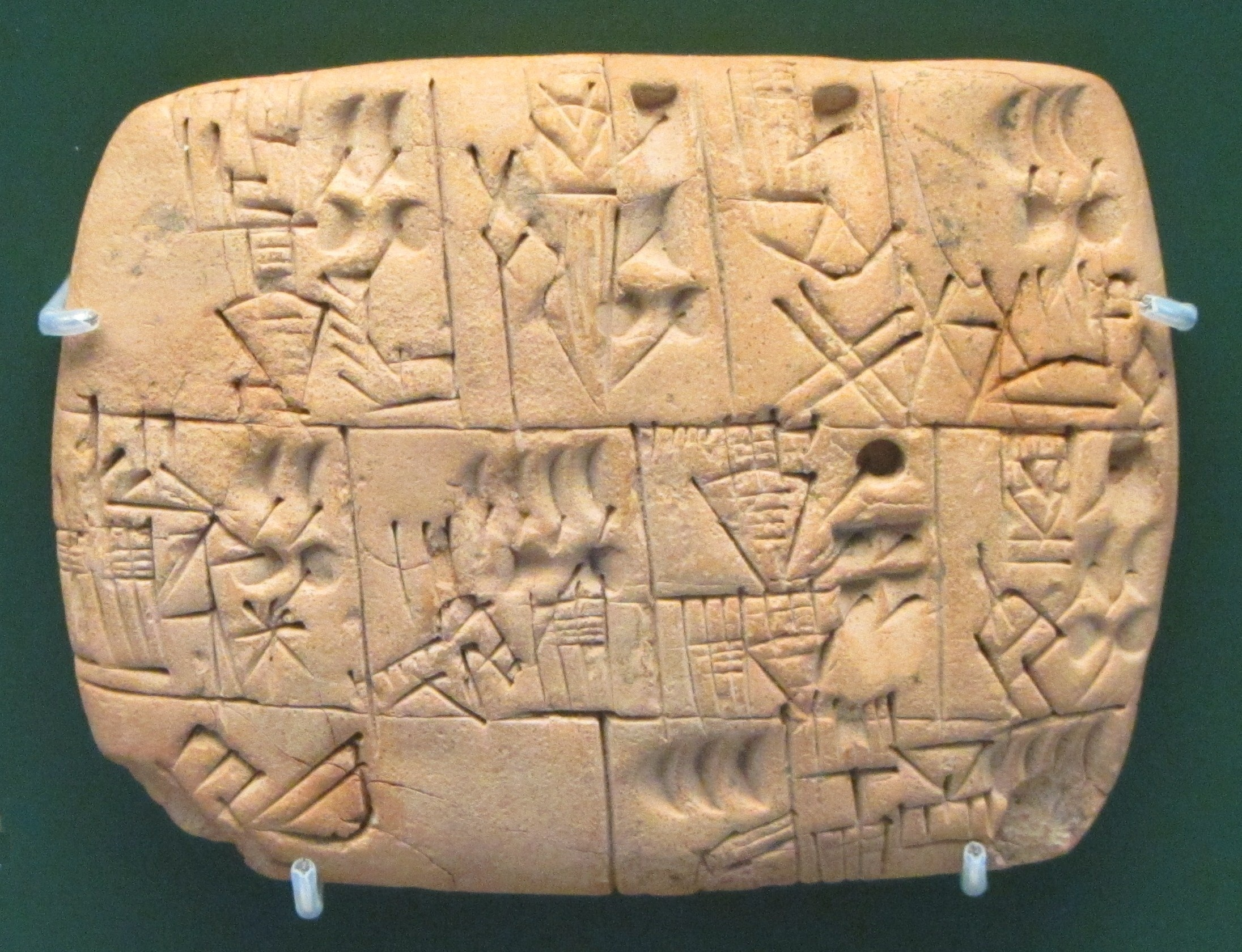
Early writing tablet, c. 3100-3000 BCE

Archaeologists have found what are considered to be the oldest written texts at Uruk. From the start of excavation at Uruk in the early 1900s, archaeologists found clay tablets with pictographic signs that were recognized as precursors to cuneiform script. This Proto-Cuneiform was drawn into the clay using a pointed tool and additional circular impressions symbolized numbers. Dated to around 3200 BCE, these earliest tablets were found amongst discarded materials in pits on Eanna Level IV and would most likely have been used to seal containers and doors. Approximately 4000 clay tablets and fragments from this level have been found.

Most of these tablets would have recorded economic transactions and administrative texts such as exchanges of goods and the allocation of rations for workers, and some record the number of livestock born into a given herd, as well as the amount of livestock, such as sheep and rams, that would have been allocated to individual owners. One written text provides evidence of the social stratification of the city, listing 120 officials including the city leader as well as those who led the law, the plow, and the lambs. This same text also provides special terms for priests, metalsmiths, and potters. By the third millennium BCE, other genres of writing, including poetry, mathematics, and sciences, began to appear.

== Architecture ==
Location of main ruins within city of Uruk

The largest remaining ruins at Uruk are the temple structures near the center of the city. The ruins, which consist of an approximately 6 square kilometer area, are encircled by a city wall. Uruk temple architecture followed the building plans of the previous Ubaid culture. Structures were made on tripartite plans with a central hall and smaller rooms on either side. One of the most famous examples of Uruk temples is the White Temple, named after the white gypsum plaster that covered it. The White Temple, dedicated to the god Anu was built upon a platform 13 meters high. This style is a predecessor to the ziggurat formations that would come later in Mesopotamian history. Unlike later temples, the White Temple lacks a central niche.

There is evidence for buildings in Uruk used for cult purposes which were richly decorated and that contained altars for worship to the various gods. For example, within Temple C in the Eanna District, pillars containing cone mosaic panels were discovered by excavators. To create these panels, dated to around 3300-3000 BCE, 10-centimeter cones of baked clay or gypsum were arranged and pressed into wet plaster and painted to create diamond, triangle, and zigzag patterns.

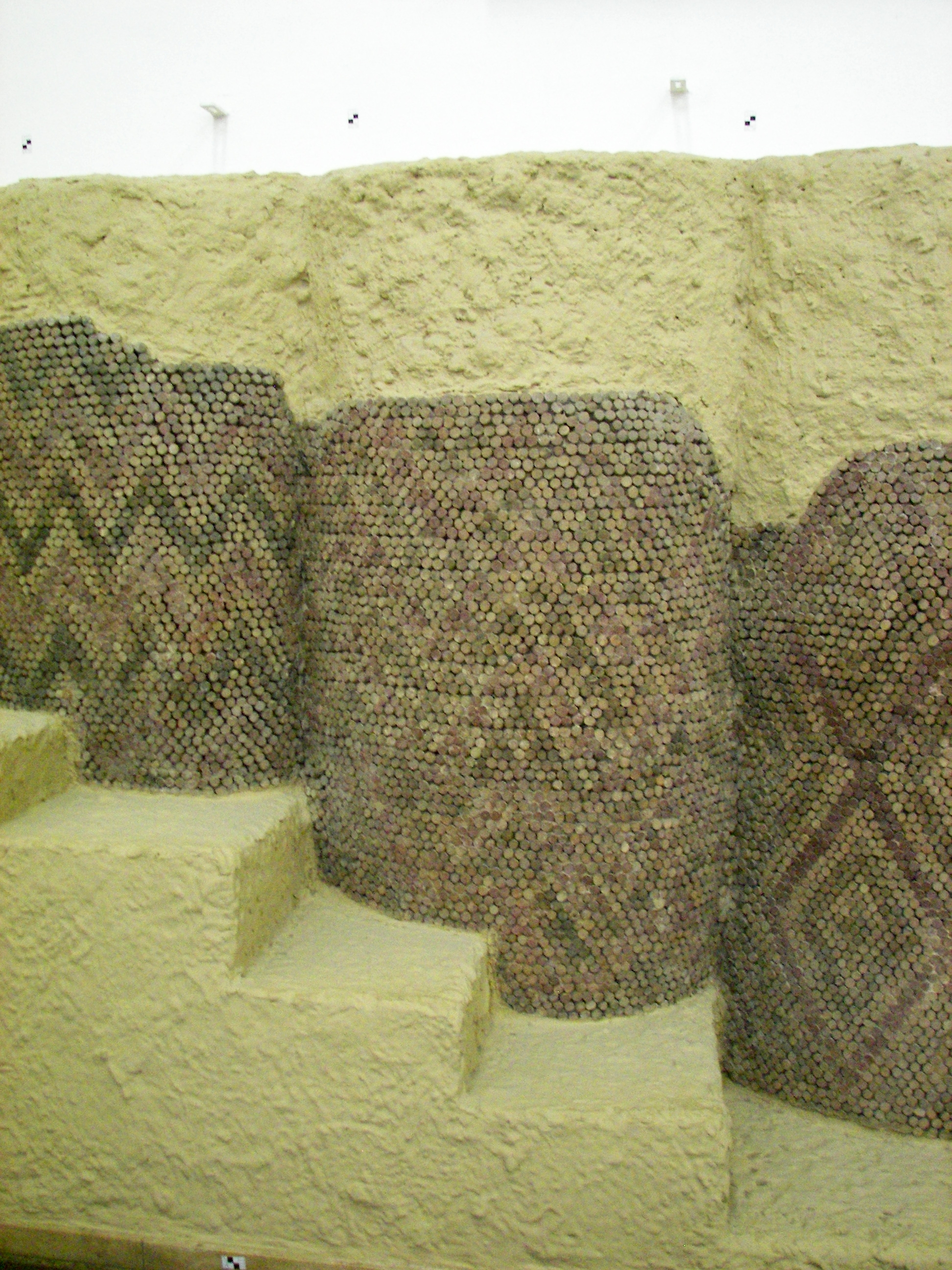
Reconstruction of a cone mosaic from the Eanna temple.

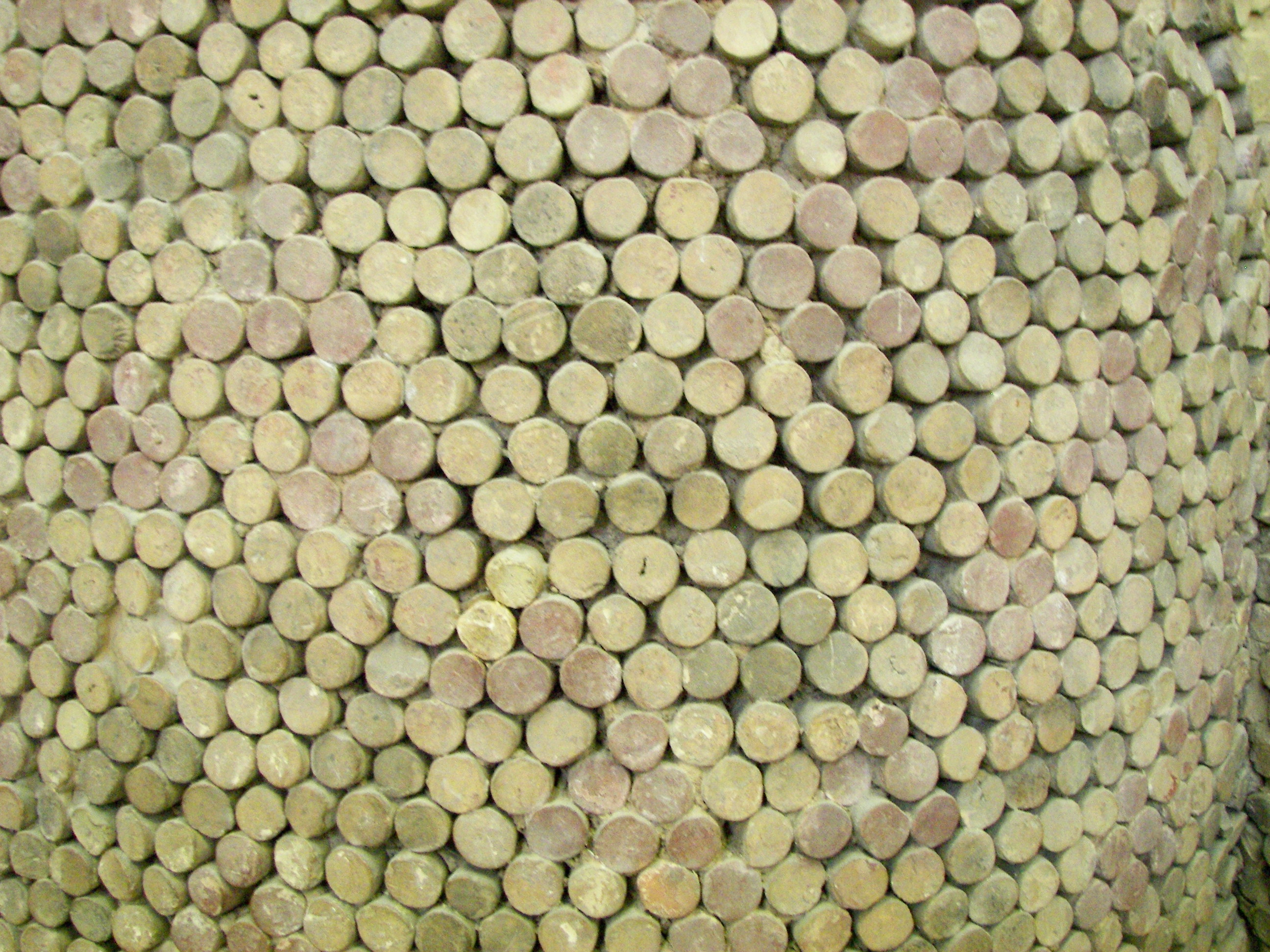
Detail of Reconstruction of a cone mosaic from the Eanna temple.

== See also ==
- Representation in Babylonia and Assyria by Zainab Bahrani
