= Neo-Sumerian art =

Neo-Sumerian art c. 2112 BC – c. 2004 BC

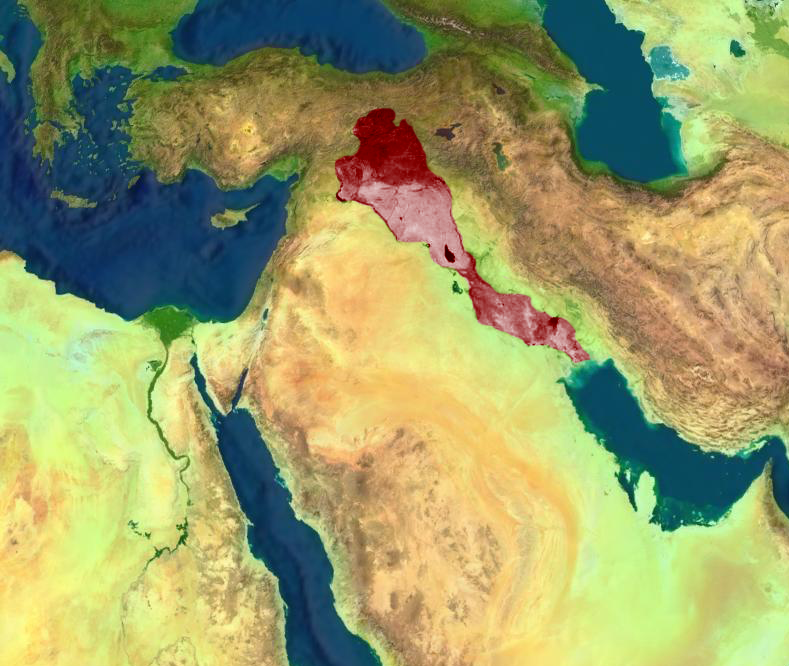
Map showing the general Mesopotamian geographical location.

Neo-Sumerian art is a period in the art of Mesopotamia made during the Third Dynasty of Ur or Neo-Sumerian period, c. 2112 BC – c. 2004 BC, in Southern Mesopotamia (modern-day Iraq). It is known mostly for the revival of the Sumerian stylistic qualities and was centered around royalty and divinity.

The art of the Neo-Sumerian period was also influenced by the Akkadians, whose period of rule preceded this. Many large temples and ziggurats were built in this period, most of which possessed monumental staircases. These staircases were probably thought to be used by divinity, for ascending and descending between heaven and Earth. The temple at the bottom of the stairs was created as a home for the god/gods that the temple worshiped. As for Neo-Sumerian sculptures, the many prayer statues of Gudea were the most common for this period, although in fact his reign ended a few years before the Third Dynasty of Ur. Usually these statues would present the patesi (see also, Ensi), with a shaved head and face, and wearing a monk like robe. The statues of human figures of the Neo-Sumerian period were known for their distinct eyebrows, lips, and fingers. Overall, the architecture, as well as the sculpture of the Neo-Sumerians, presented a strong theme of serene majesty and intense religious fervor. Other themes that were characteristic of Neo-Sumerian art are the themes of force and power, the creation of a strong capital, and religious ceremonial artifacts.

== Architecture ==
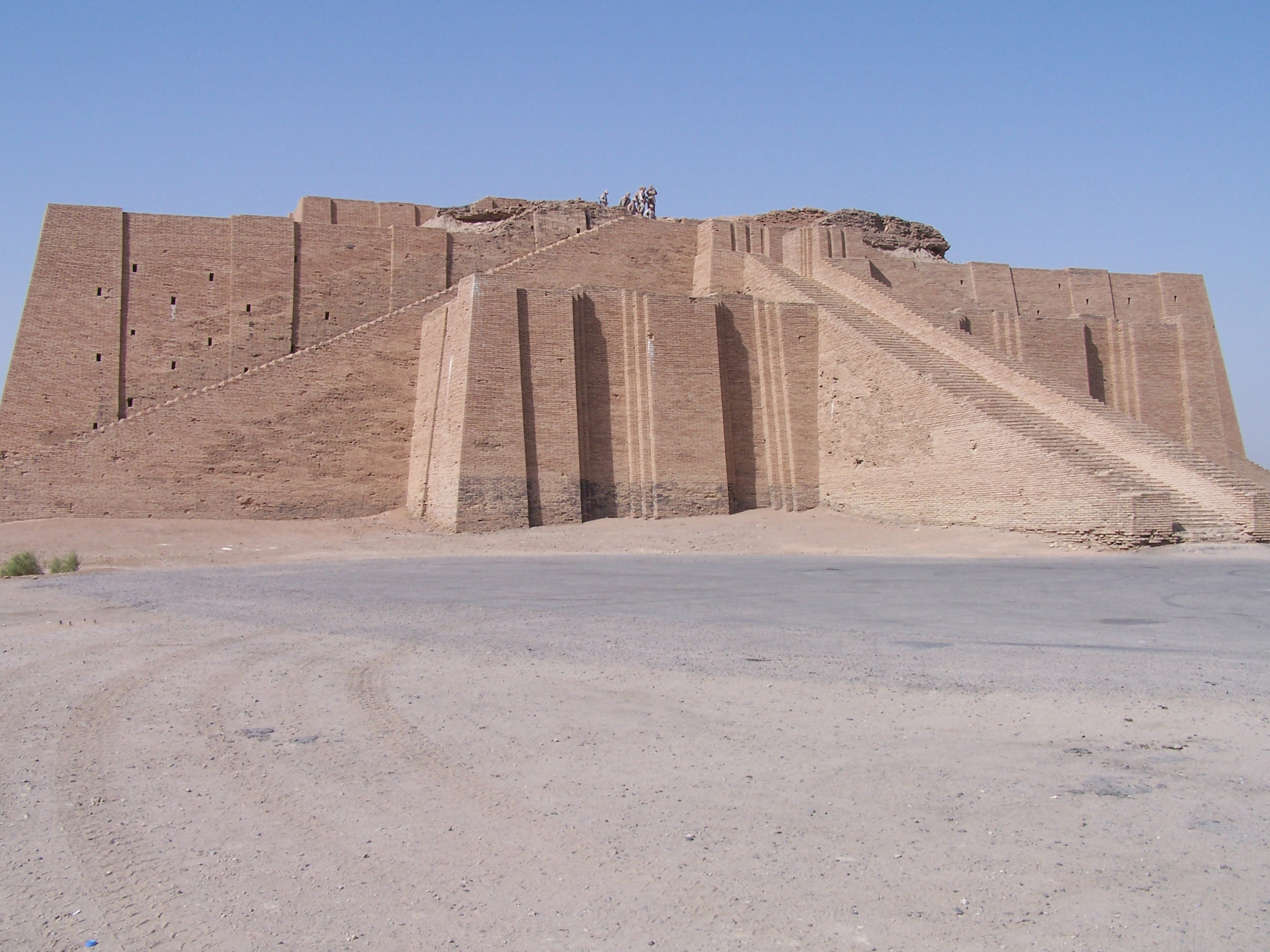
Ziggurat of Ur

Neo-Sumerian architecture was mostly based on the materials that were available in that demographic area. For this area, quality materials were not available so the people had to settle for tall reeds from marshes and mud-brick developments for housing and more permanent structures. There were many stages of architectural development and temple design. These designs started as basic ideas that progressed into more advanced designs. Beginning structures based on the primitive blueprints have small shrines, measuring only 12 ft x 15 ft, with one offering table in front of the niche. Many early temples were structured this way. In later years, old temples were strengthened and enlarged by adding buttresses. Typical characteristics of Neo-Sumerian temples were that they were located on top of ziggurats, a man-made mountain, and were the places where a god would be expected. Levels of elevation and staging were also typical characteristics of both temples and ziggurats. The name of the Neo-Sumerian specific ziggurat is the Ziggurat of Ur.

== Statues of Gudea ==
Gudea had many sculptures made resembling him during his life (now numbered from A to AA). They are all similar varying from the ruler standing or seated, folded hands, bare-headed or wearing a wool hat. They are all made from diorite, which could only be carved and finished by few. Gudea’s son, Ningirsu, had many statues made of him during his reign. They also closely resembled his fathers. Female figures are very rare. They are sculpted with the same master craftsmanship as Gudea’s. This proves they were probably made for a woman of royalty or otherwise of great importance. Much of the art was hard to put on a timeline. There was a, “lack of archeological context.”

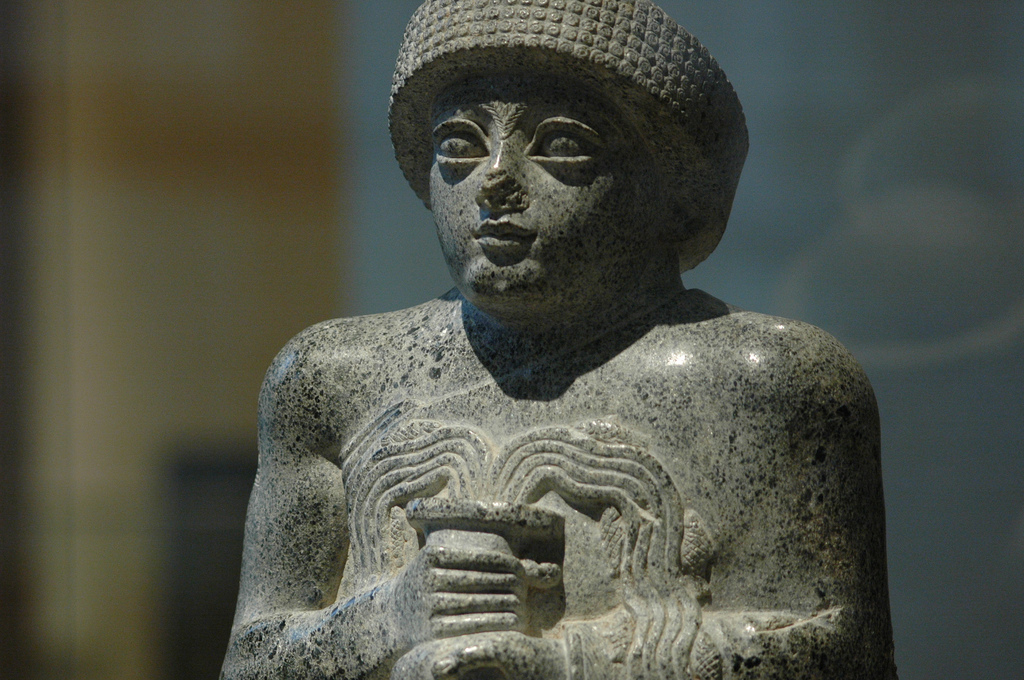
Statue N of Gudea of Lagash, Louvre

The first example is the Statue of Patesi (governor) He was the 7th Patesi and ruled for over 15 years. He is seen dressed like a monk in a robe that shows his bare shoulders and right arm. The hands in these sculptures are always shown clasped in prayer. The details in the features, like the fingertips and facial features, is noticed more because of the simplicity of the robe. The contrast gives the smaller details more importance.

The next piece is a Female statue representation. Her hands are in the same position as those of Gudea. She is dressed in a robe and shawl covered with embroidered ribbons. Her curly hair is covered with a cloth headdress with a ribbon. The importance grows as we see her hands are also clasped in prayer.

There is also a statue of Gudea holding a jar of water. It is from 2100 BCE and is made from calcite. It stands about 2 ½ feet tall. Many sculptures are found with inscriptions by the ruler. This figure is seen with the inscription, “I am the shepherd loved by my king (Ningirsu) may my life be prolonged,” and “Gudea, the builder of the temple, has been given life.” Each part of the body is made for a specific reason. The large chest of Gudea shows us Gods have given him the fullness of life. The muscular arms show us Gods have given him strength. The large eyes signify his gaze is fixed on the gods. He is holding a jar of flowing water, with swimming fish. The water and fish are coming out in 2 streams that run down the sides of his robe. Gods and goddesses are often portrayed the same way, holding similar jars overflowing with water. It known to symbolize the prosperity they bring their people.

== Other pieces ==
The so-called Libation Cup of Gudea in the Louvre is made of soapstone. It was a goblet used in religious ceremonies. Despite the humanization of gods, this is clear evidence monsters did not completely disappear. On the cup there are 2 standing dragons holding a spear with their front legs. They are scary looking monsters with snakeheads, feline bodies, eagle’s wings and claws, and a scorpion’s tail. Both of the monsters guard a cane on which two serpents whose heads ascend to the rim of the cup. The emblem their shape creates is known as the emblem of pharmacy and medicine (See also, Rod of Asclepius).

A female head of alabaster of c. 2100 BCE from Ur is in the Penn Museum (Museum of the University of Pennsylvania) in Philadelphia. It has been identified with a Neo-Sumerian princess and also with the goddess Ningal. She wears a large smooth circular head band colored gold to hold her hair. The bottom half of her face is missing due to natural wear and tear from aging. The eyes are still vibrant. They are inlaid with lapis lazuli. The head is made with the rare and costly dark stone, diorite.

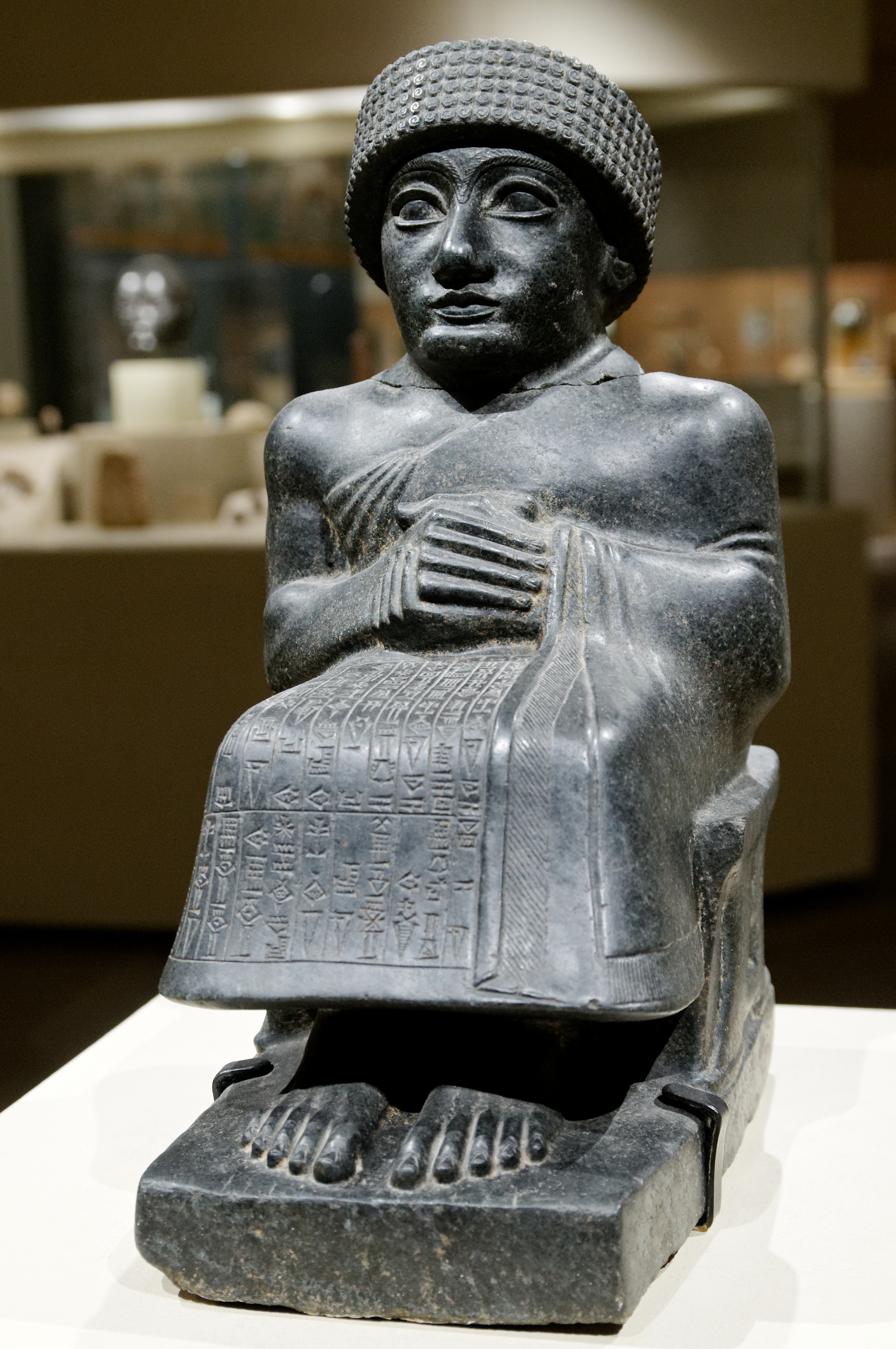
Statue of Gudea P; circa 2090 BC; diorite; height: 44 cm, width: 21.5 cm, depth: 29.5 cm; Metropolitan Museum of Art

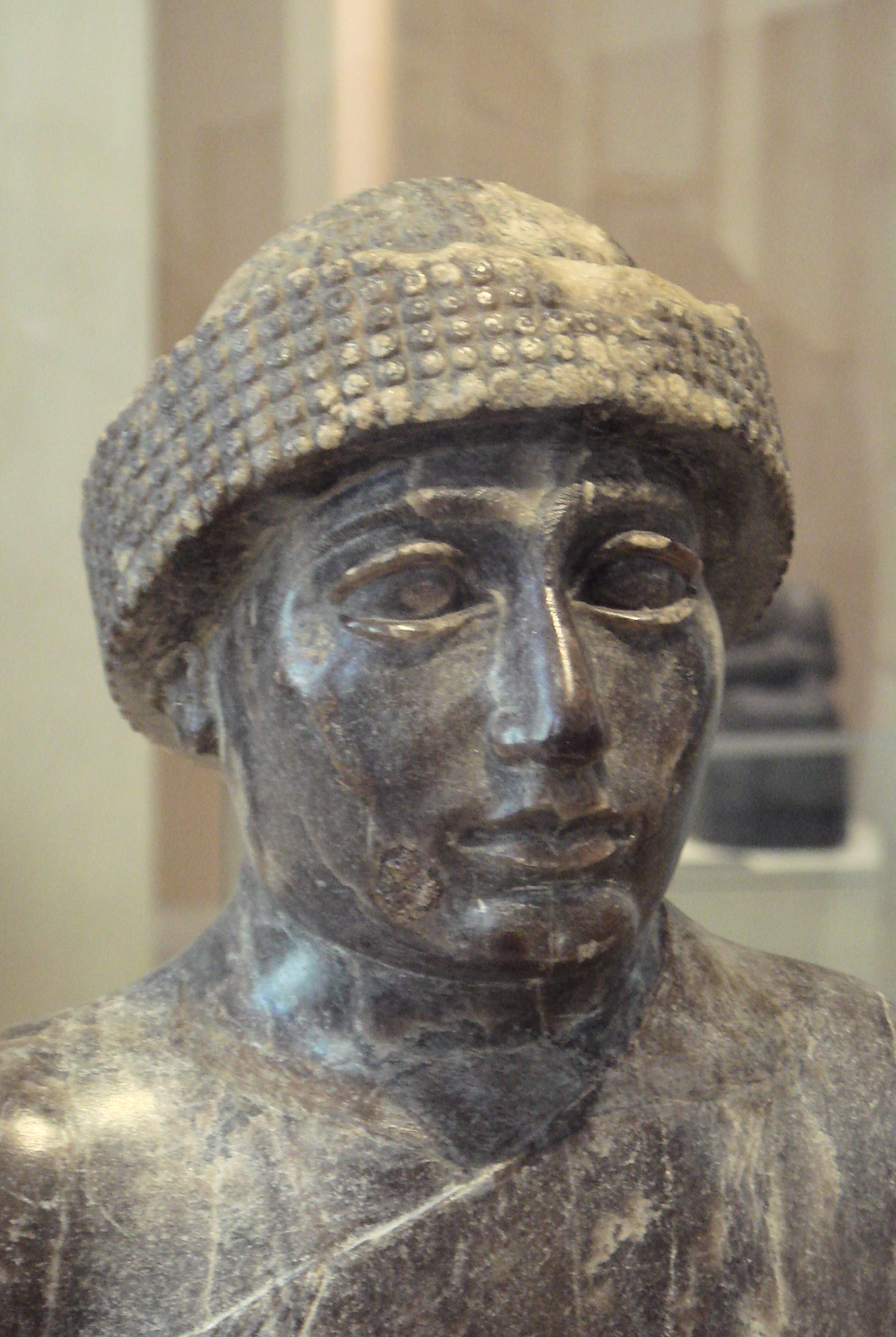
Portrait of Ur-Ningirsu. Louvre Museum

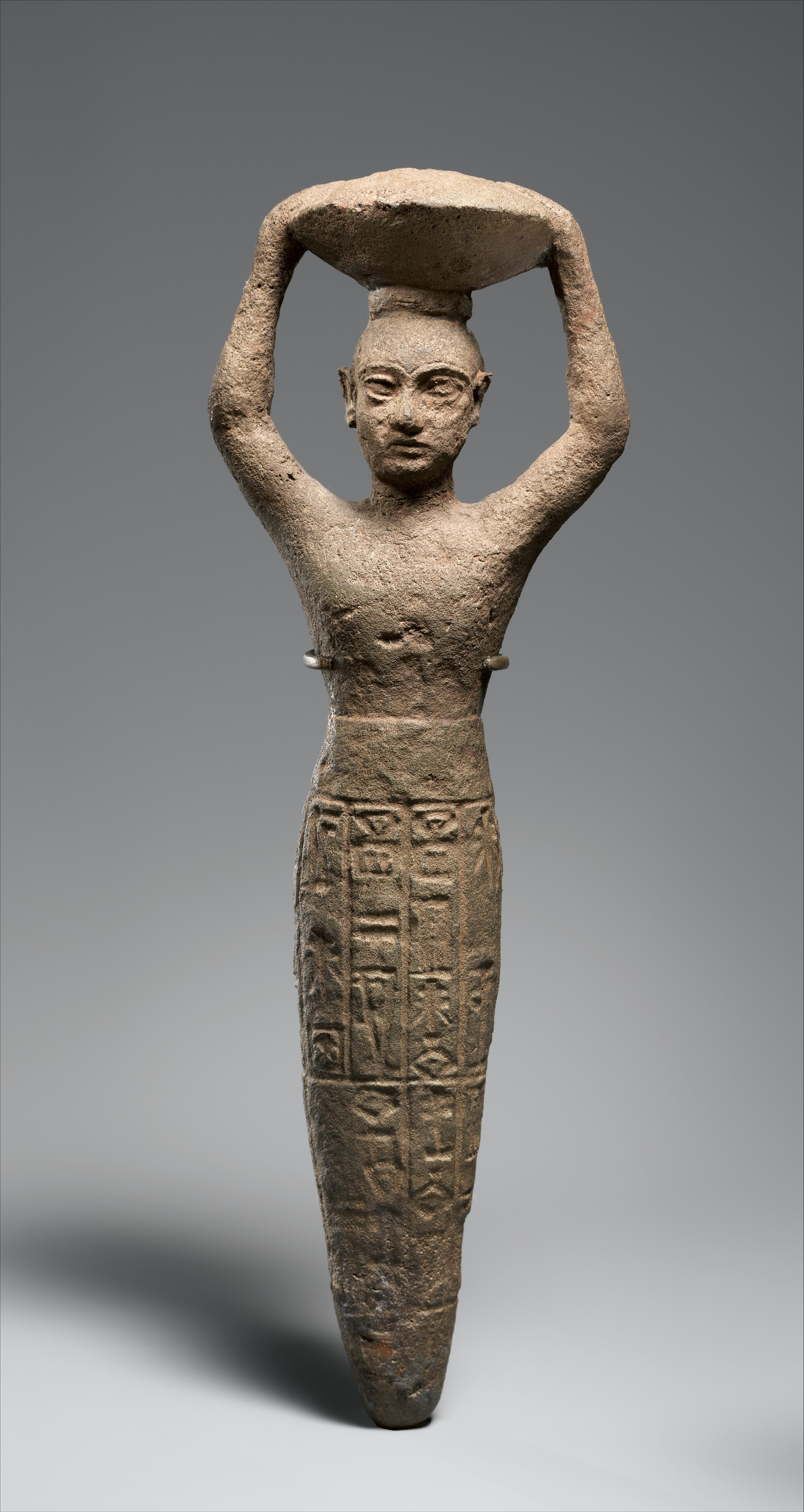
Foundation figure of Ur-Namma holding a basket; 2112-2095 BC; copper alloy; height: 27.3 cm; Metropolitan Museum of Art (New York City)

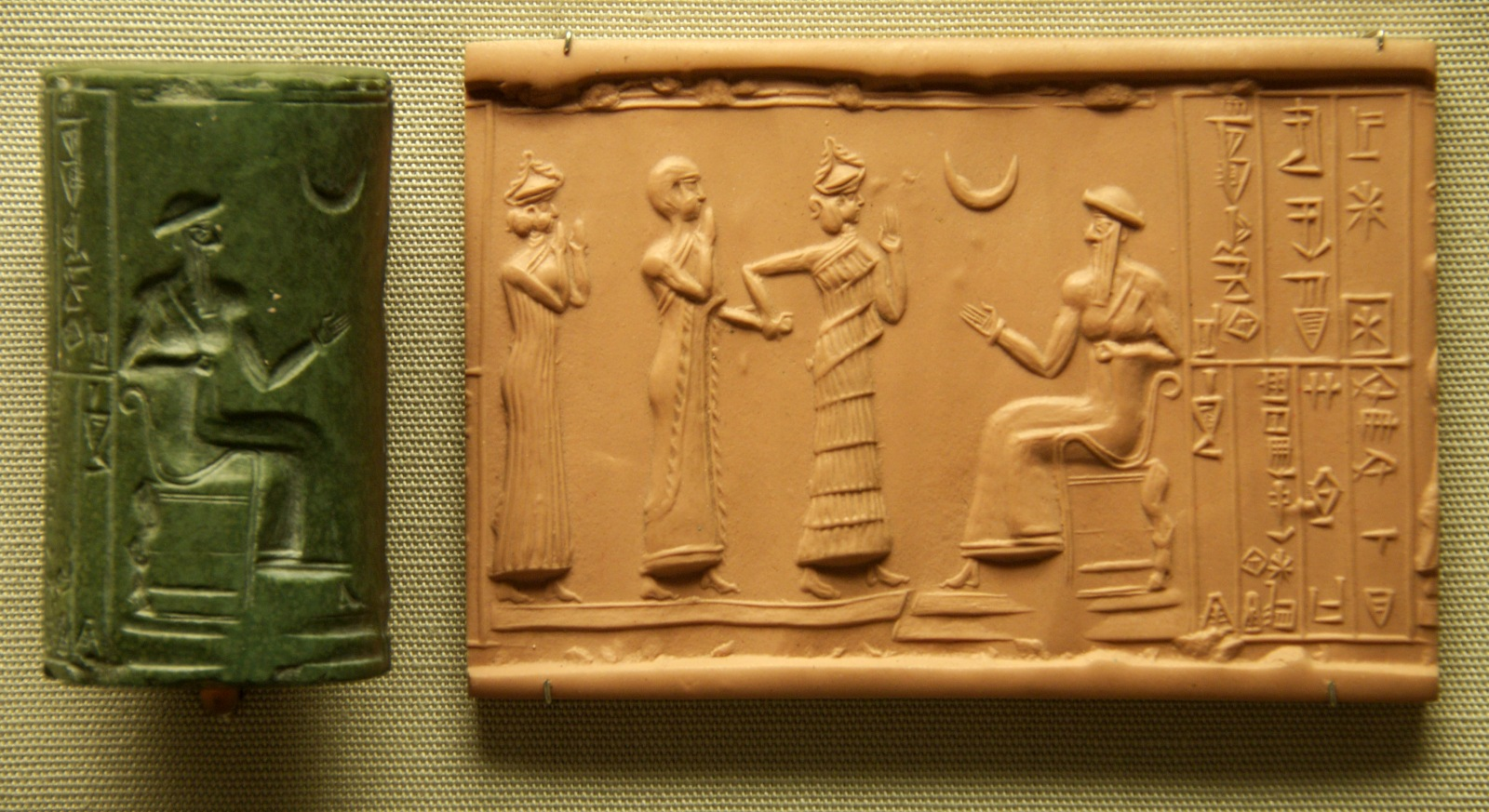
Seal of Hash-hamer, showing enthroned king Ur-Nammu, with modern impression; circa 2100 BC; greenstone; height: 5.3 cm; British Museum (London)

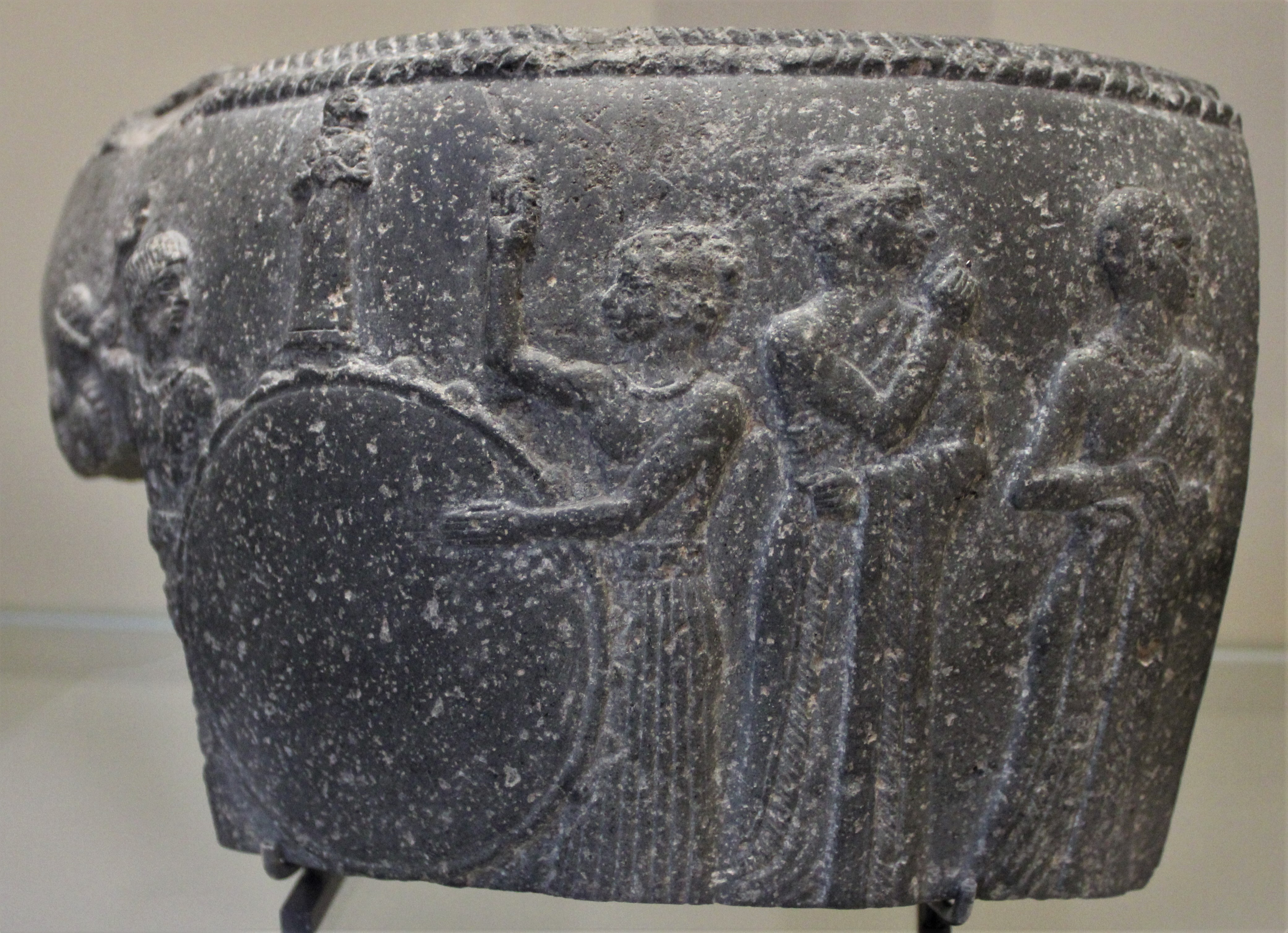
Vase with musicians. Louvre Museum

== See also ==
- Representation in Babylonia and Assyria by Zainab Bahrani
