= The Graven Image =

Nonfiction book by Zainab Bahrani

The Graven Image: Representation in Babylonia and Assyria
- 2003 Penn Press book jacket
- Author: Zainab Bahrani
- Subject: Assyro-Babylonian Art and its Historiography
- Published: 2003
- Publisher: University of Pennsylvania Press (Penn Press)
- Publication place: United States
- Media type: Print, eBook
- Pages: 256
- ISBN: 978-0-812236484
- OCLC: 51923406
- Website: Official website

The Graven Image: Representation in Babylonia and Assyria is a nonfiction book written by Zainab Bahrani and published by the University of Pennsylvania Press in July 2003. In this book, the author interrogates the fundamental importance of types of imagery for ancient Assyrian and Babylonian cultures in Mesopotamia. This includes a critique of modern scholarship in this area, resulting in new and original authorial perspectives pertaining to this topic. In the narrative, the author employs multiple disciplines.

== Synopsis ==
The book took ten years to write. In this book, the author, Bahrani, applies multiple academic fields such as art history, philosophy, linguistics, historiography and religion. The book is written for two types of audiences: art historians familiar with modern theories of representation, and scholars of ancient Near Eastern cultures who, according to Bahrani, do not normally apply these modern ideas. Hence, in the first part she critiques modern scholarship and in the second, she presents her own argument about representation in ancient Iraq.

Bahrani says that scholarship pertaining to ancient Near Eastern art has held incorrect views. Also, this art has often been treated as though it were relatively unimportant, yet she says, it strongly influenced the art that came after it. So, part of the purpose of this book is to underscore Near Eastern art's importance. To do this she uses a very modern lens, which is seen as unusual in this field.

One of her key arguments is that applying the Greek idea called mimesis to this ancient art is mistaken. Mimesis is the concept that an artwork is a separate copy of reality. Instead, Bahrani believes the people who made this art saw it in a different way. She argues that for them, the images were not separate from reality. Instead, they were deeply and constantly connected to reality, as if reality and the image were part of the same existential fabric.

== See also ==
- Penelope's Bones by Emily Hauser
- Art of Mesopotamia
- Art of Uruk
- Neo-Sumerian art
