= Warka Vase =

Carved alabaster vessel, from temple at Uruk (Warka), Iraq

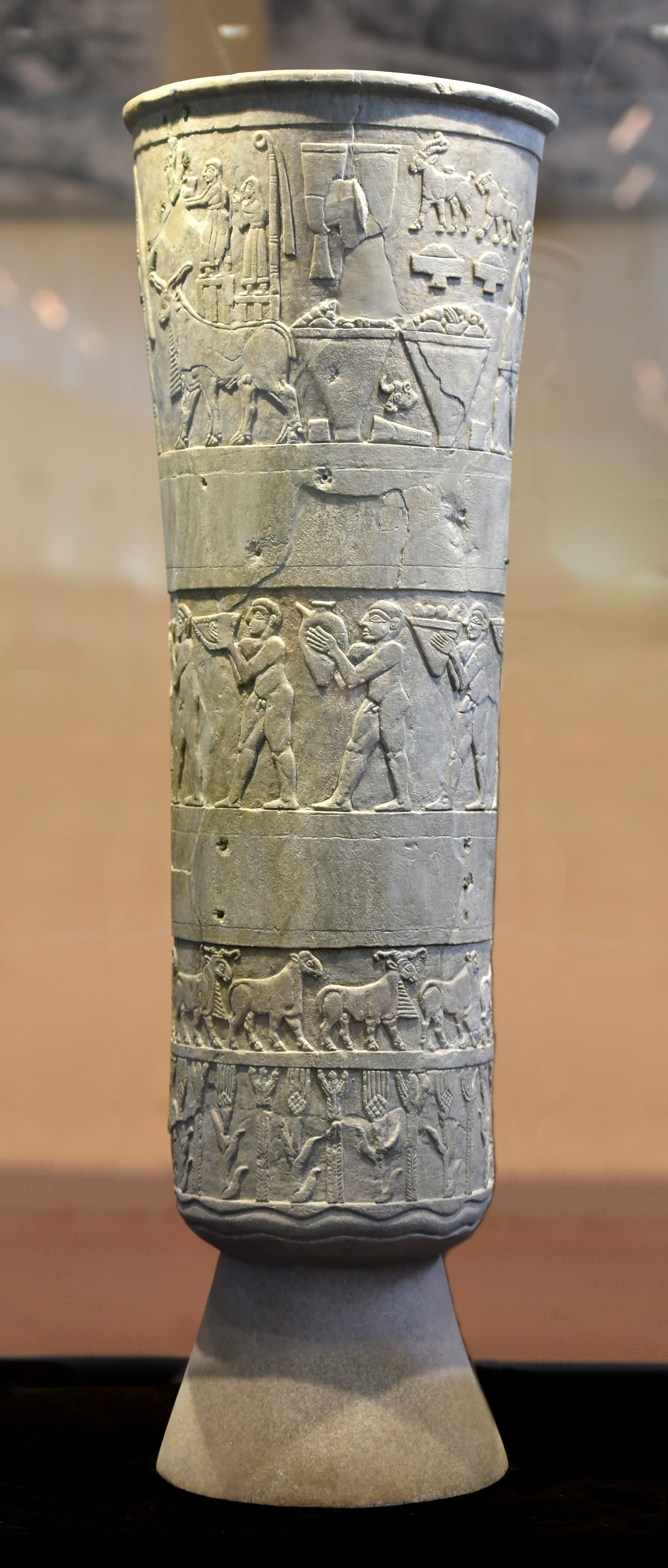
- The original Warka Vase, dated to c. 3500–2900 BC. National Museum of Iraq, March 2019.
- Material: Alabaster
- Created: c. 3500–2900 BC
- Present location: Iraq Museum, Iraq

Location

The Warka Vase or Uruk vase is a slim carved alabaster vessel found in a temple complex in the ruins of the ancient city of Uruk, located in the modern Al Muthanna Governorate, in southern Iraq. Like the Uruk Trough, Mask of Warka, and the Narmer Palette from Egypt, it is one of the earliest surviving works of narrative relief sculpture, found in a layer dated to c. 3100–2900 BC. Simple relief sculpture is also known from much earlier periods, from the site of Göbekli Tepe, dating to circa 9000 BC.

The bottom register displays naturalistic components of life, including water and plants, such as date palm, barley, and wheat. On the upper portion of the lowest register, alternating rams and ewes march in a single file. The middle register conveys naked men carrying baskets of foodstuffs symbolizing offerings. Lastly, the top register depicts a female deity accepting a votive offering. A female deity stands at the front portion of the gate surrounded by her richly filled shrine and storehouse (identifiable by two reed door poles with dangling banners). This scene may illustrate a reproduction of the ritual marriage between the goddess and her consort that ensures Uruk's continued vitality.

== Discovery ==
The vase was discovered as a collection of 15 fragments by German archaeologists in their sixth excavation season at Uruk in 1933/1934. It was recorded as find number W14873 in the expedition's field book under an entry dated 2 January 1934, which read "Großes Gefäß aus Alabaster, ca. 96 cm hoch mit Flachrelief" ("large container of alabaster, circa 96 cm high with flat-reliefs"). It was on excavation level III which dated to the Jemdat Nasr period (also called the Uruk III period) ie (c. 3100-2900 BC) in the "Eanna district". It was not found in situ as part of a "temple treasury hoard" so that would be a no later than date. Because of some similarities to numerical tables it has been suggested the vase dates to Uruk V (c, 3500 BC). It was found along with a number of other items (including fragments of another vase) and was deemed a votive object by the excavators. The vase had been repaired in antiquity using copper bands. Because the reconstruction of the base is uncertain, estimates of the total height of the vase range from 105 cm to 110 cm (the relief portion is 92 cm high). The diameter at the mouth is 38 cm and 28 cm and the narrowest point near the base and wall thickness is 2 cm at the top part and increases toward the bottom. The three registers are 25 cm, 17.5 cm, and 20.5 cm from top to bottom. The bottom register is divided by a band which results in the vase sometimes being said to have four registers.

A plaster cast was made of the original and this reproduction stood for many decades in room 5 of the Near-Eastern Museum in Berlin (Vorderasiatisches Museum Berlin), Germany.

== Decoration ==
The vase has three registers – or tiers – of carving. The bottom register depicts the vegetation in the Tigris and Euphrates delta, such as the natural reeds and cultivated grain. Above this vegetation is a procession of animals, such as ram and sheep presented in a strict profile view. The procession continues in the second register with nude males carrying bowls and jars of sacrificial elements, such as fruit and grain. The top register is a full scene, rather than a continuous pattern. In this register, the procession ends at the temple area. A female deity stands with two bundles of reeds behind her. She is being offered a bowl of fruit and grain by a nude figure. A ruler-figure dressed in a ceremonial kilt and long belt faces her leading the procession.

Warka vase

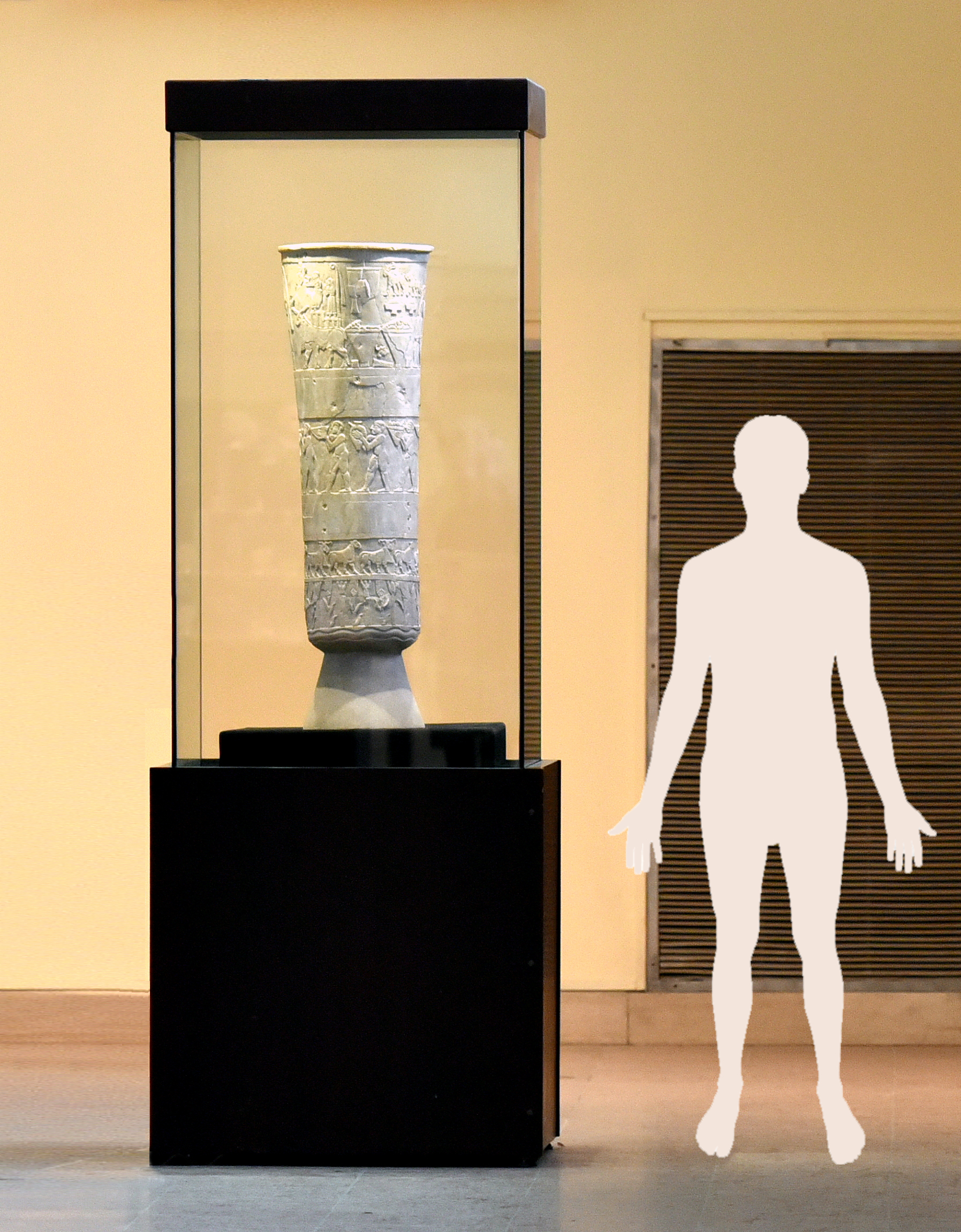
The votive Warka Vase within its display case at the Sumerian Gallery of the Iraq Museum. It is about 1 meter tall.

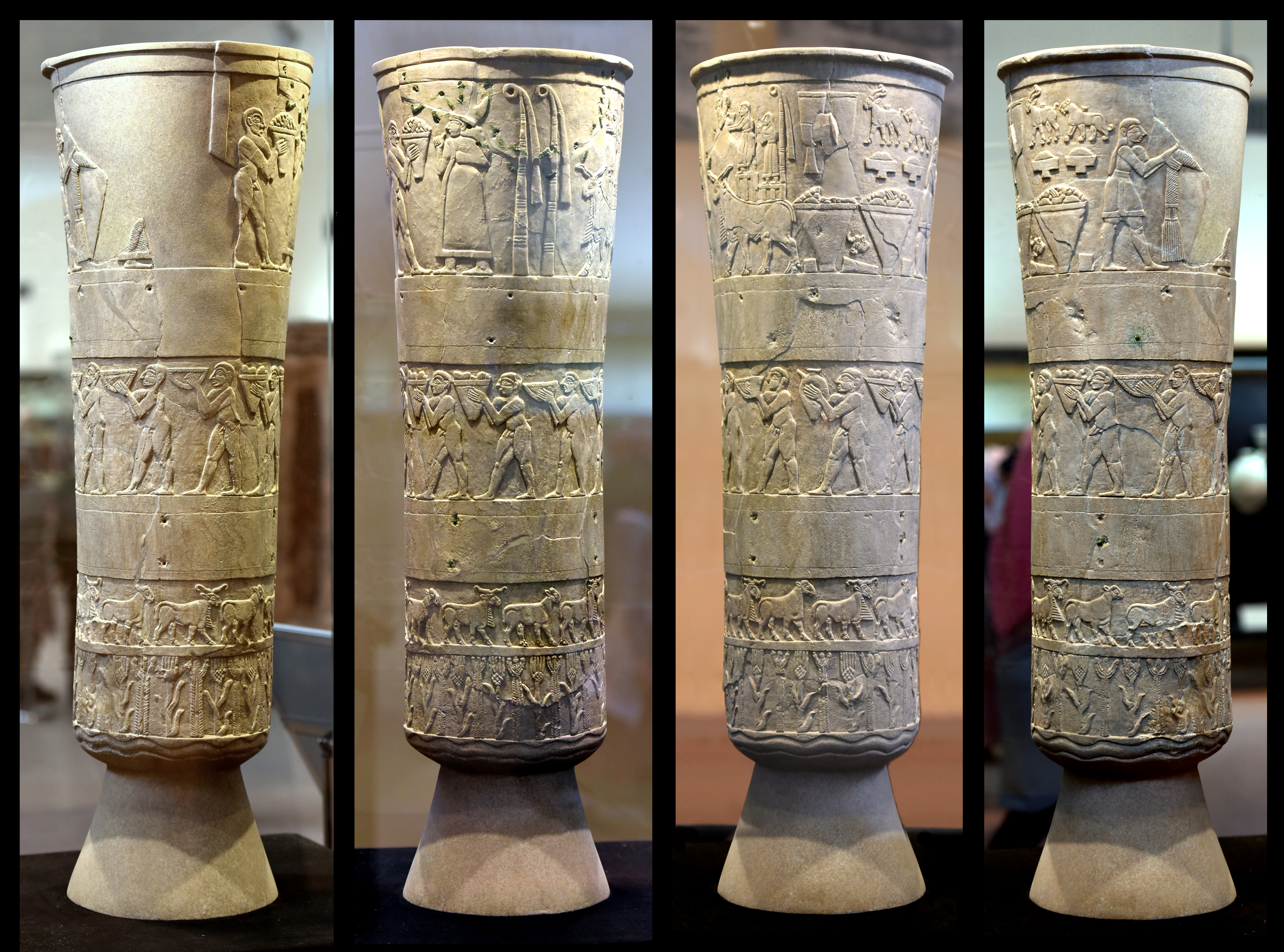
The vase shows presentation scenes to a goddess

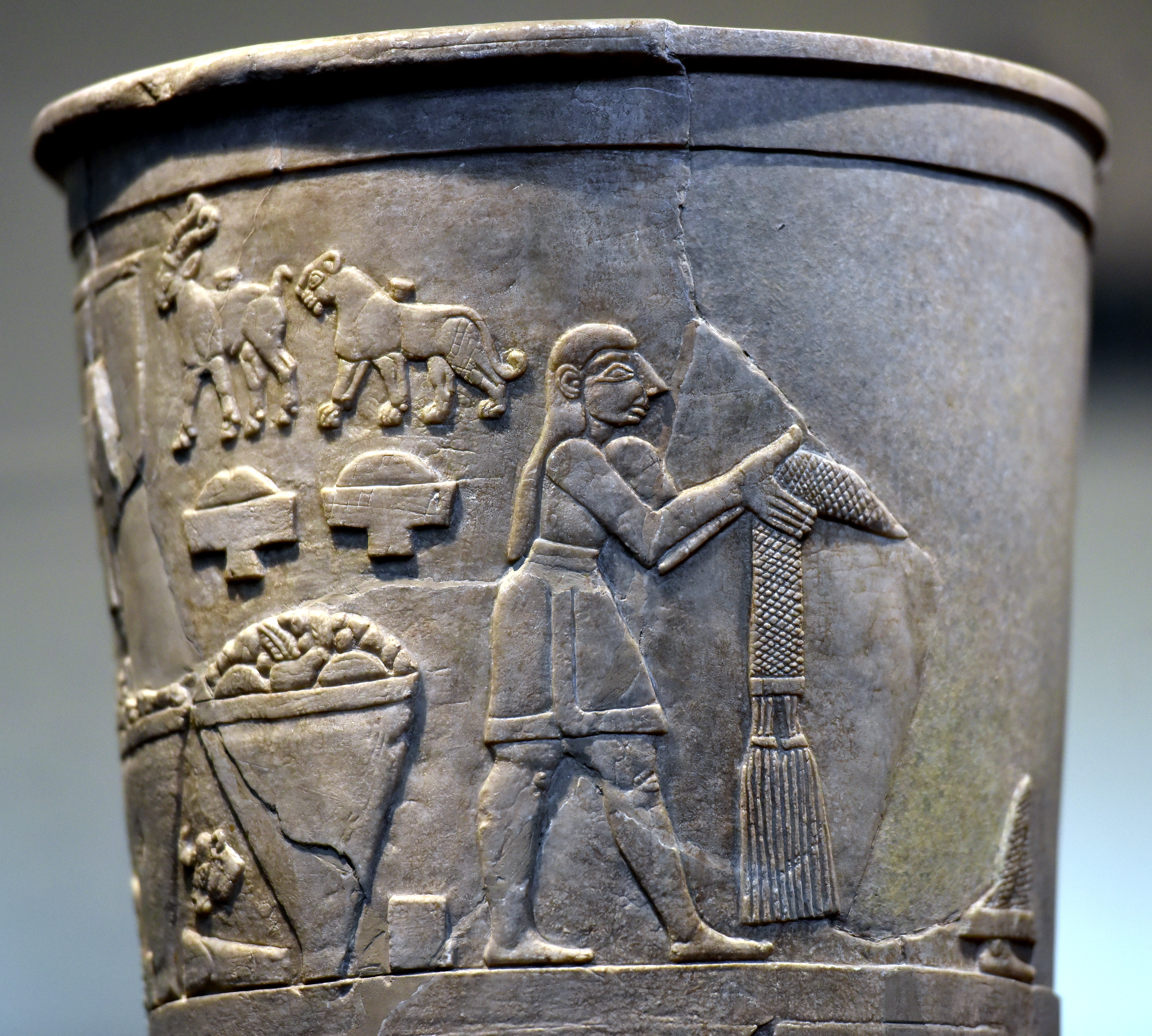
Top register, Warka Vase, Iraq Museum

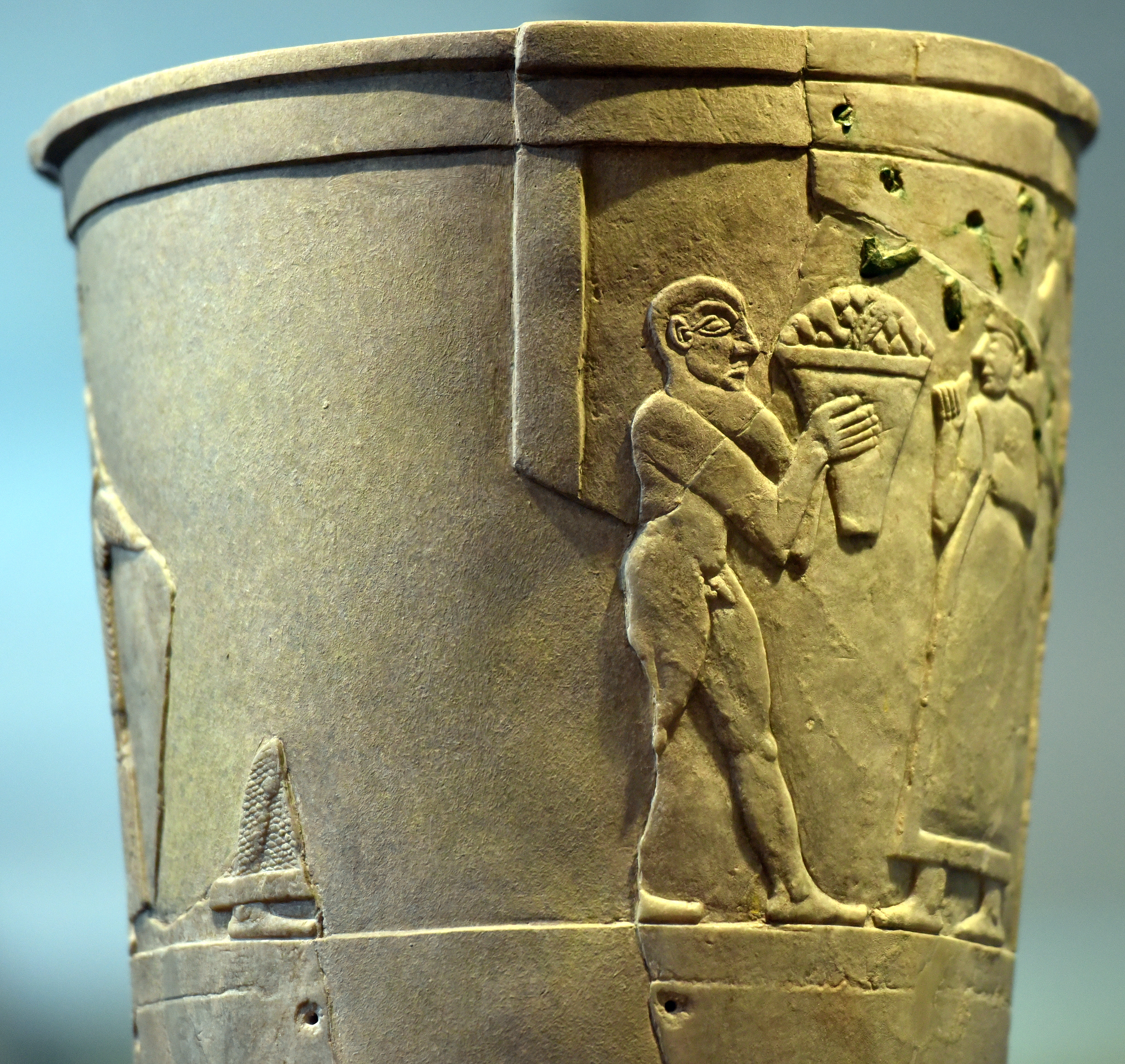
Top register, Warka Vase, Iraq Museum

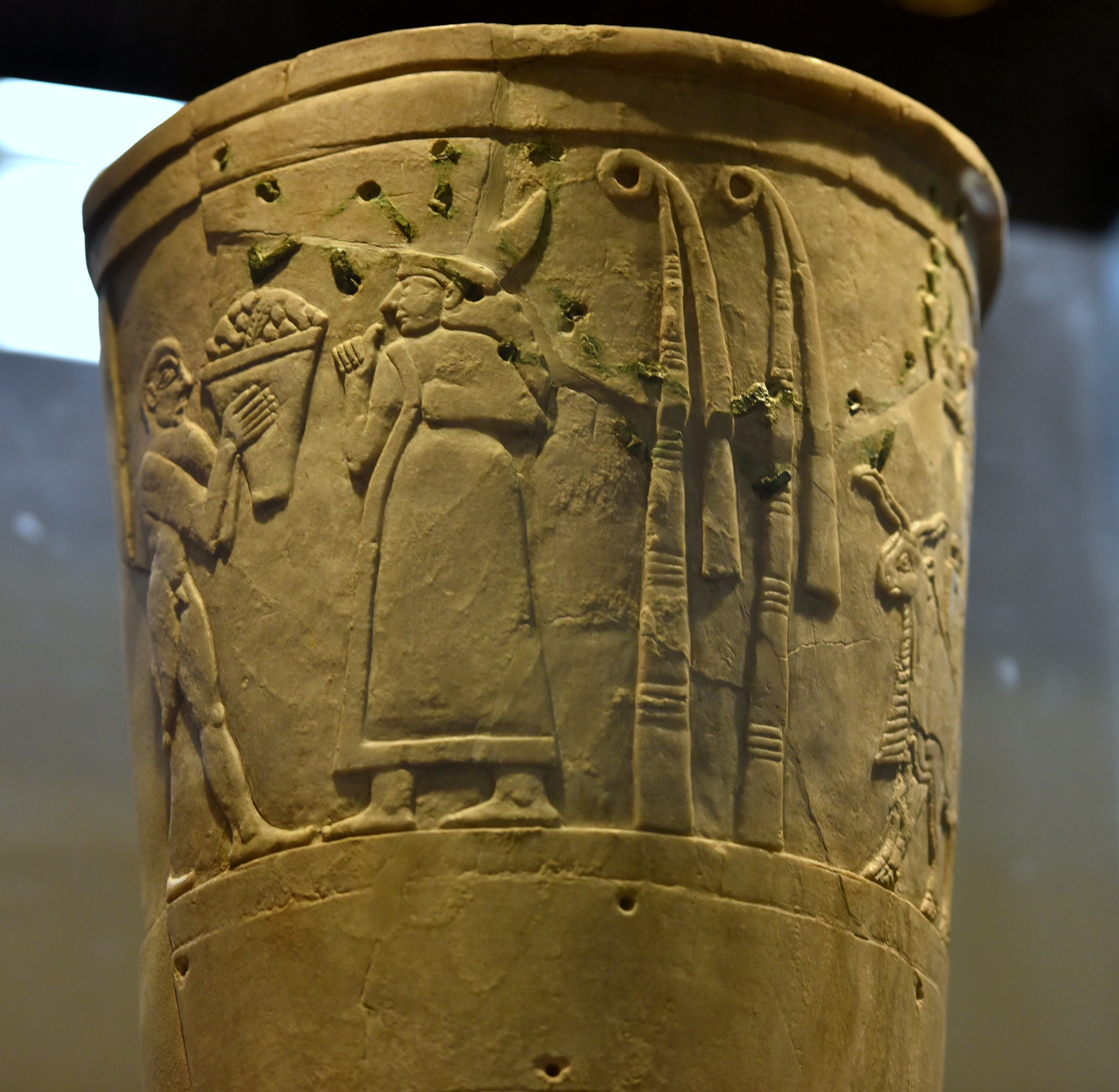
Top register, Warka Vase, Iraq Museum

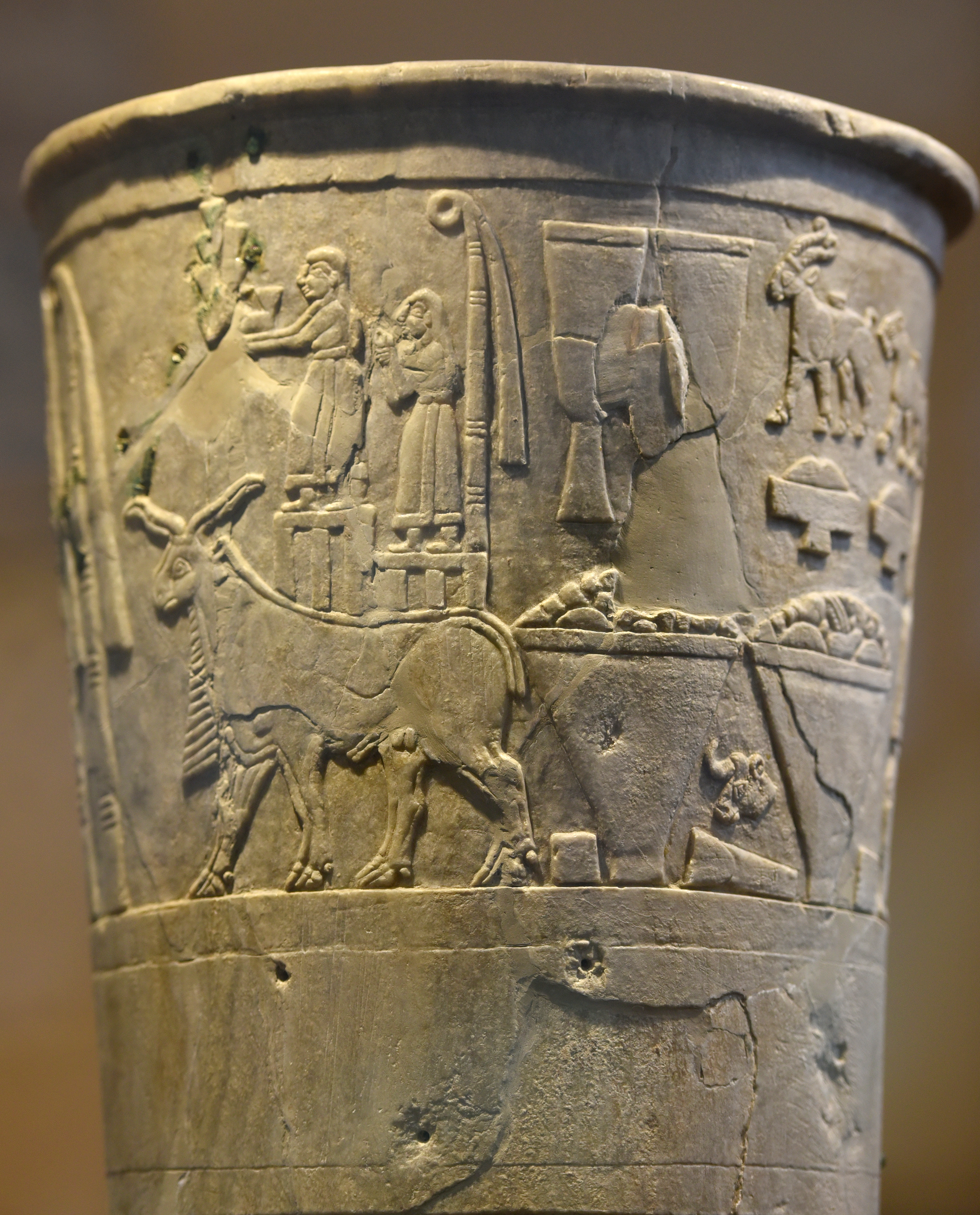
Top register, Warka Vase, Iraq Museum

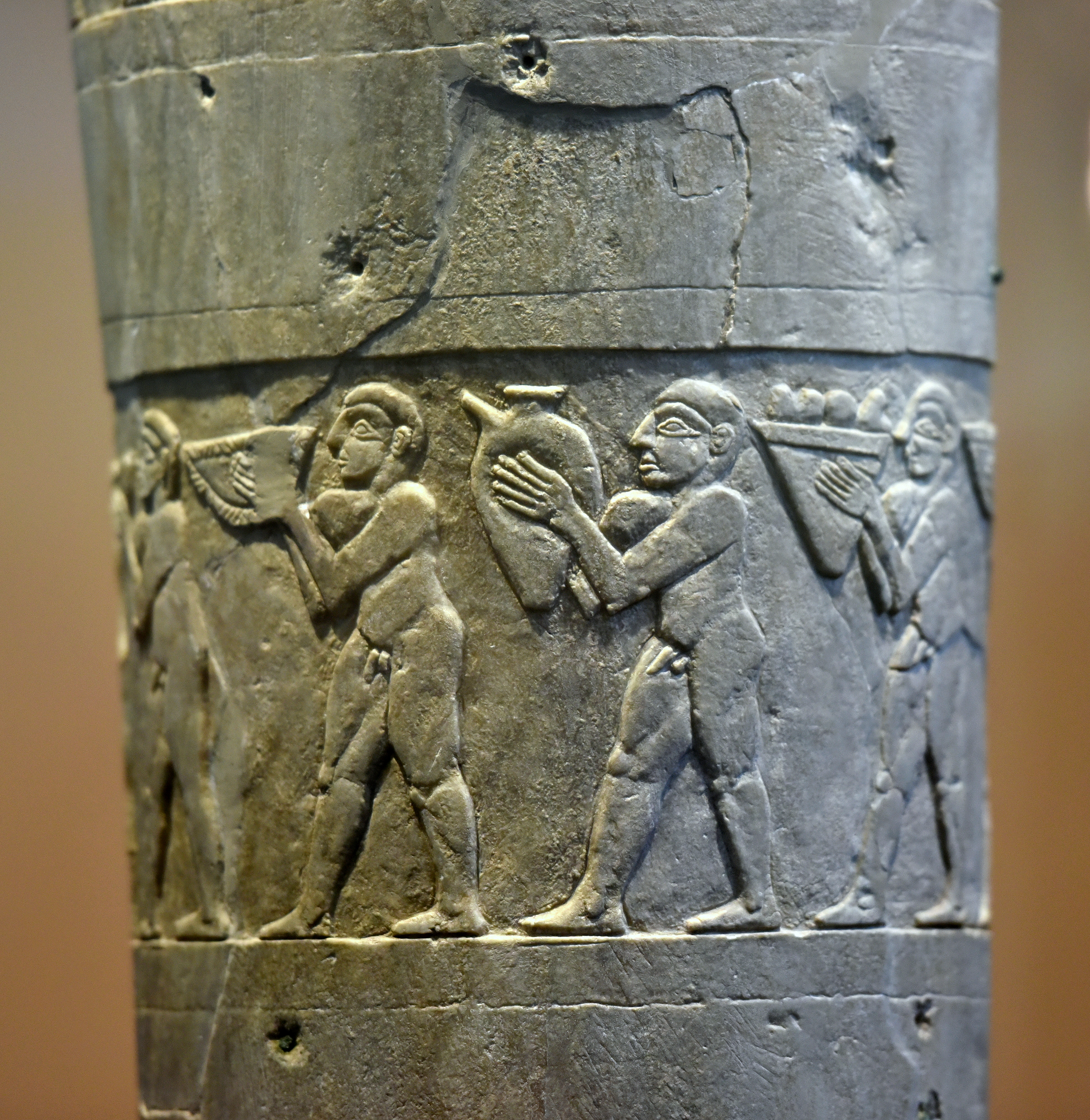
Middle register, Warka Vase, Iraq Museum

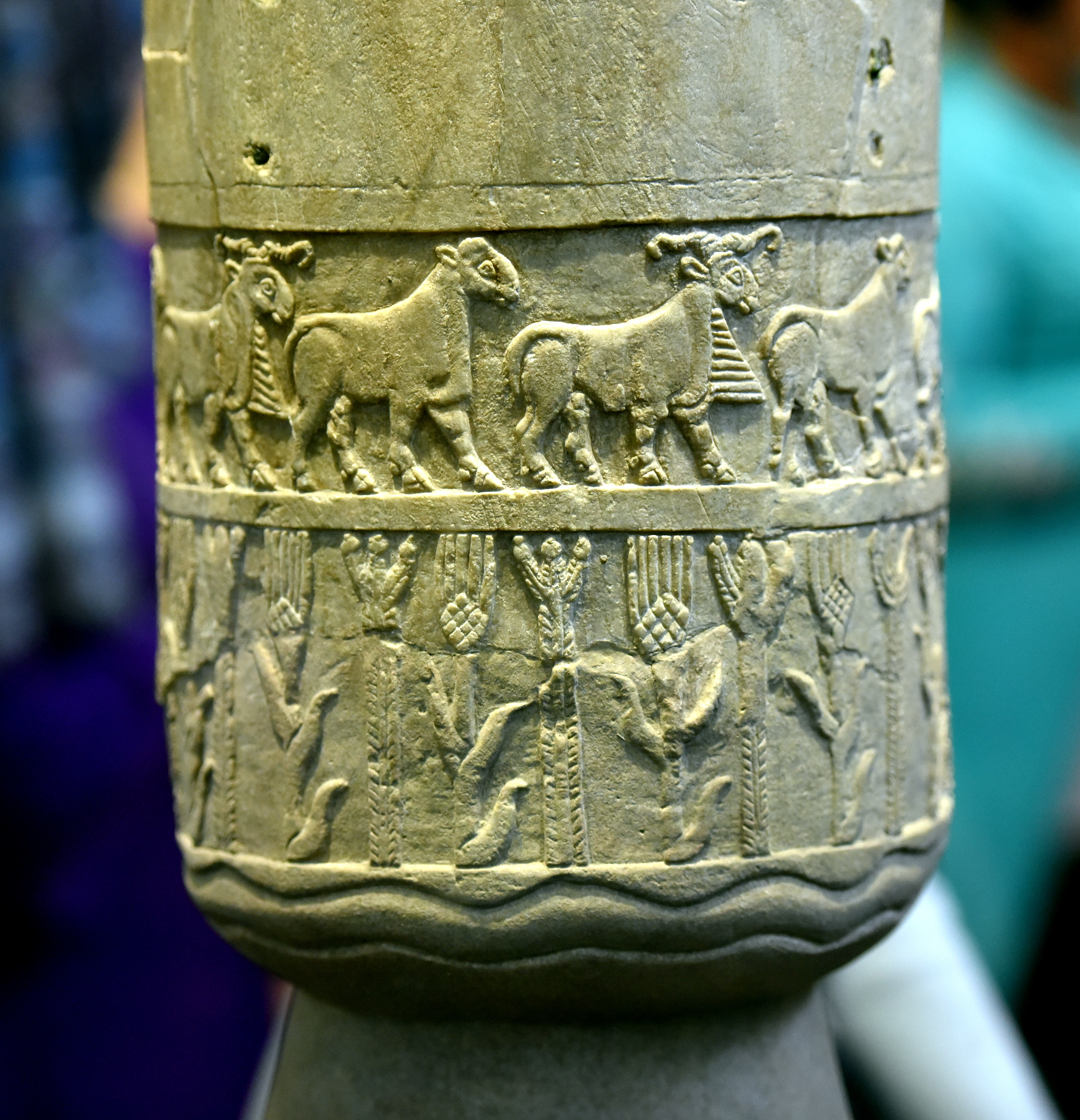
Lower register, Warka Vase, Iraq Museum

=== Iconography ===
Iconography of the Upper Register
Uruk Vase Guide to Proto-Cuneiform
Key	Description	Proto-Cuneiform	Cuneiform	Sign Name	Sumerian	Akkadian
1	Unknown object	--	--	EN	--	--
2	Building or City	--	--	URU	--	--
3	Pole	--	--	--	--	--
4	Harvest in Vessel	--	--	--	--	--
5	Ewe shaped vessel	--	--	--	--	--
6	Lion shaped vessel	--	--	--	--	--
7	Unknown Object	--	--	ME	--	--
8	Bucrania	--	--	--	--	--
9	Uruk Vase	--	--	--	--	--

== Theft and restoration ==
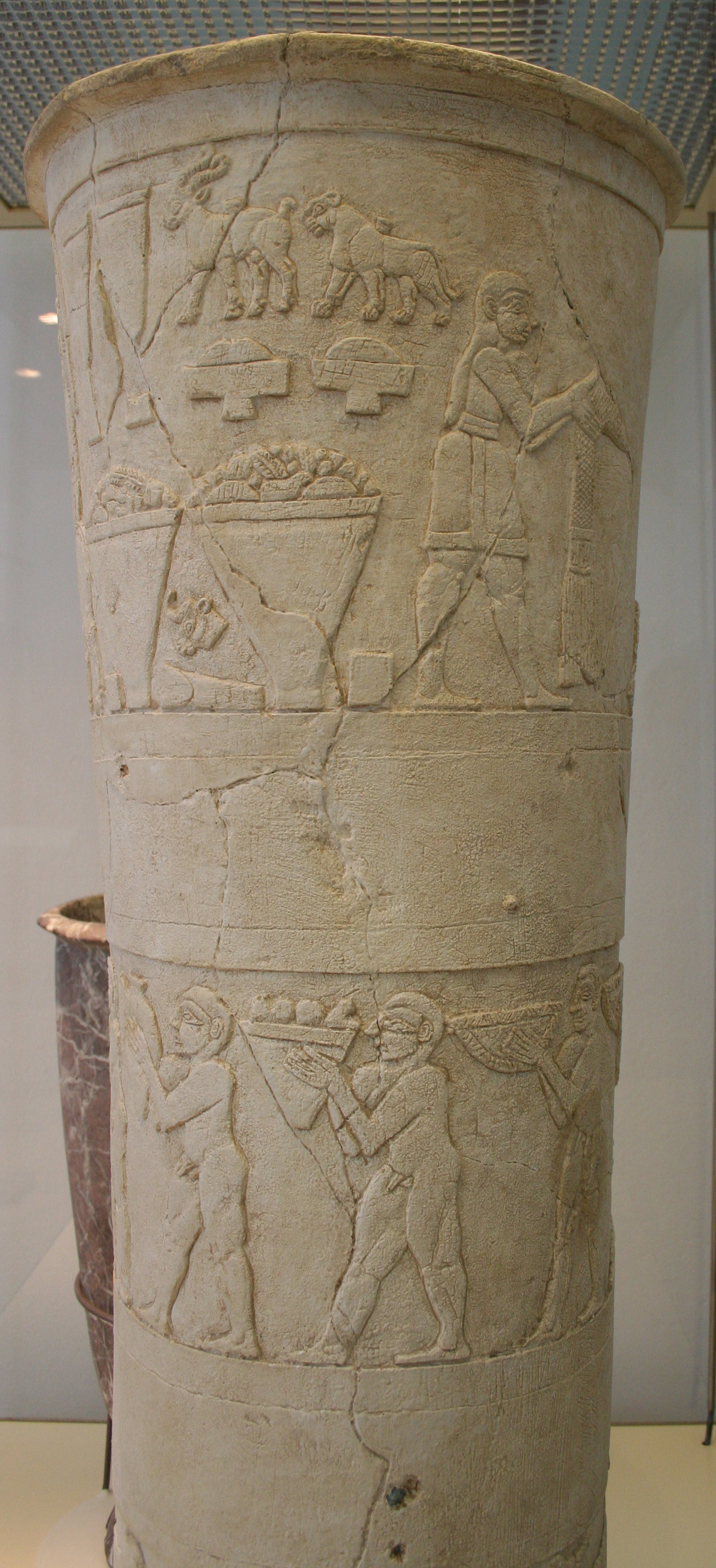
Replica of the vase in the Pergamon Museum in Berlin, Germany

The Warka Vase was one of the thousands of artifacts which were looted from the National Museum of Iraq during the 2003 Invasion of Iraq. In April 2003, it was forcibly wrenched from the case where it was mounted, snapping at the base (the foot of the vase remaining attached to the base of the smashed display case.

The vase was later returned during an amnesty to the Iraq Museum on 12 June 2003 by three unidentified men in their early twenties, driving a red Toyota vehicle. As reported by a correspondent for The Times newspaper,

As they struggled to lift a large object wrapped in a blanket out of the boot, the American guards on the gate raised their weapons. For a moment, a priceless 5,000-year-old vase thought to have been lost in looting after the fall of Baghdad seemed about to meet its end. But one of the men peeled back the blanket to reveal carved alabaster pieces that were clearly something extraordinary. Three feet high and weighing 600 lb intact, this was the Sacred Vase of Warka, regarded by experts as one of the most precious of all the treasures taken during looting that shocked the world in the chaos following the fall of Baghdad. Broken in antiquity and stuck together, it was once again in pieces.

Soon after the vase's return, broken into 14 pieces, it was announced that the vase would be restored. A pair of comparison photographs, released by the Oriental Institute, Chicago, showed significant damage (as of the day of return, 12 June 2003) to the top and bottom of the vessel.

The fully restored Warka Vase (museum number IM19606) is now on display in the Iraq Museum.

== See also ==
- Archaeological looting in Iraq
- Art of Mesopotamia
- Blau Monuments
- Stele of Ushumgal
