= Uruk Trough =

Sculpture from the site of Uruk, Iraq

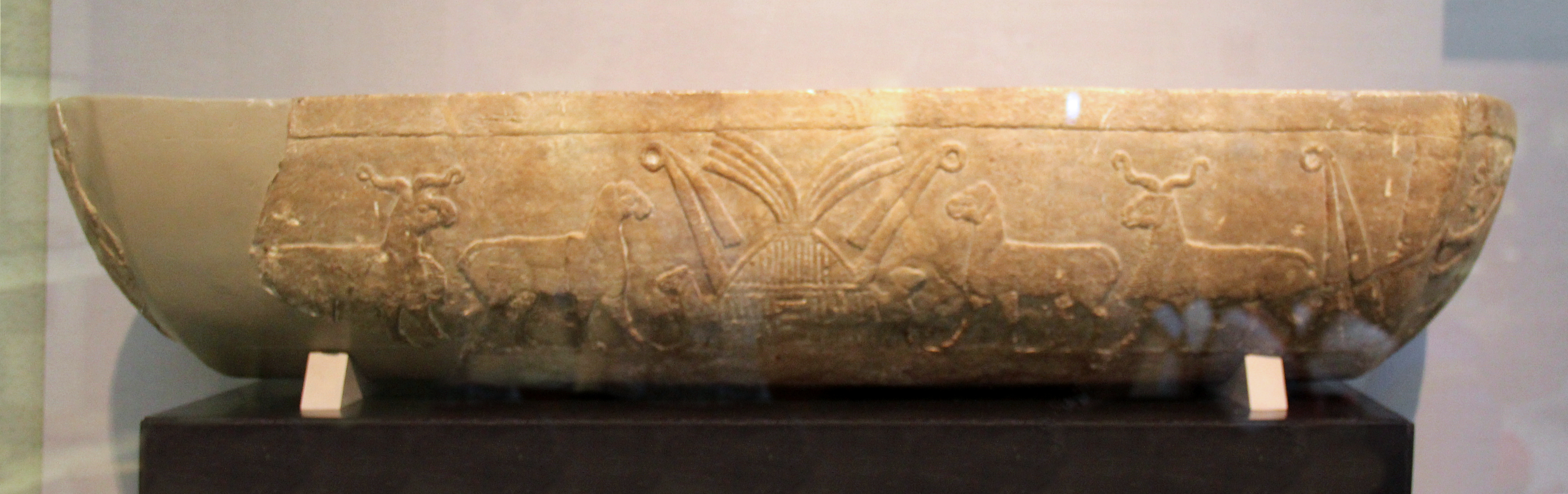
- The Uruk Trough as displayed in the British Museum
- Material: Gypsum
- Size: 96.5 cm long
- Created: 3300-3000 BC
- Present location: British Museum, London
- Registration: 1928,0714.1

Location

The Uruk Trough is an important Sumerian sculpture found at the site of Uruk, Iraq. It has been part of the British Museum's collection since 1928. Along with the Uruk Vase, the trough is considered to be one of the earliest surviving works of narrative relief sculpture from the Middle East, dating to 3300–3000 BC, during the Uruk period. Simple relief sculpture is known from much earlier periods, from the site of Göbekli Tepe, dating to circa 9000 BC.

It is thought to have served as some sort of cult image in the temple of the goddess Inanna. The carving depicts a procession of sheep, but the meaning of this scene is unclear.

== History and discovery ==
The trough was found at Uruk, an ancient city of Sumer and later Babylonia situated east of the Euphrates in southern Iraq. During the Uruk period (4000–3000 BC) Uruk was one of the largest cities in southern Mesopotamia, stretching over an area of 5 square kilometres (1.9 sq mi). For a long time power seems to have been concentrated in the temples or religious organisations but eventually King Gilgamesh took over, building new structures and a massive city wall. The Uruk Trough was probably a venerated object in one of the temples in the city, perhaps devoted to the deity Inanna. The circumstances of its discovery are not known. The trough was purchased by the British Museum with the support of the National Art Collections Fund in 1928, just before the German Oriental Society carried out excavations at the site.

== Description ==
The Uruk Trough is made of gypsum, is double troughed, and is approximately 1 m (3 ft 3 in) long. A fragment of one end of the object is now in the Vorderasiatisches Museum in Berlin. It contains several scenes:

- Two male breeding sheep by a hut from which two lambs are emerging
- A female goat being mounted by a male goat
- A standing bull

== See also ==
- Uruk Vase for a contemporary object decorated in a similar style
