= Zainab Bahrani =

Iraqi archaeologist

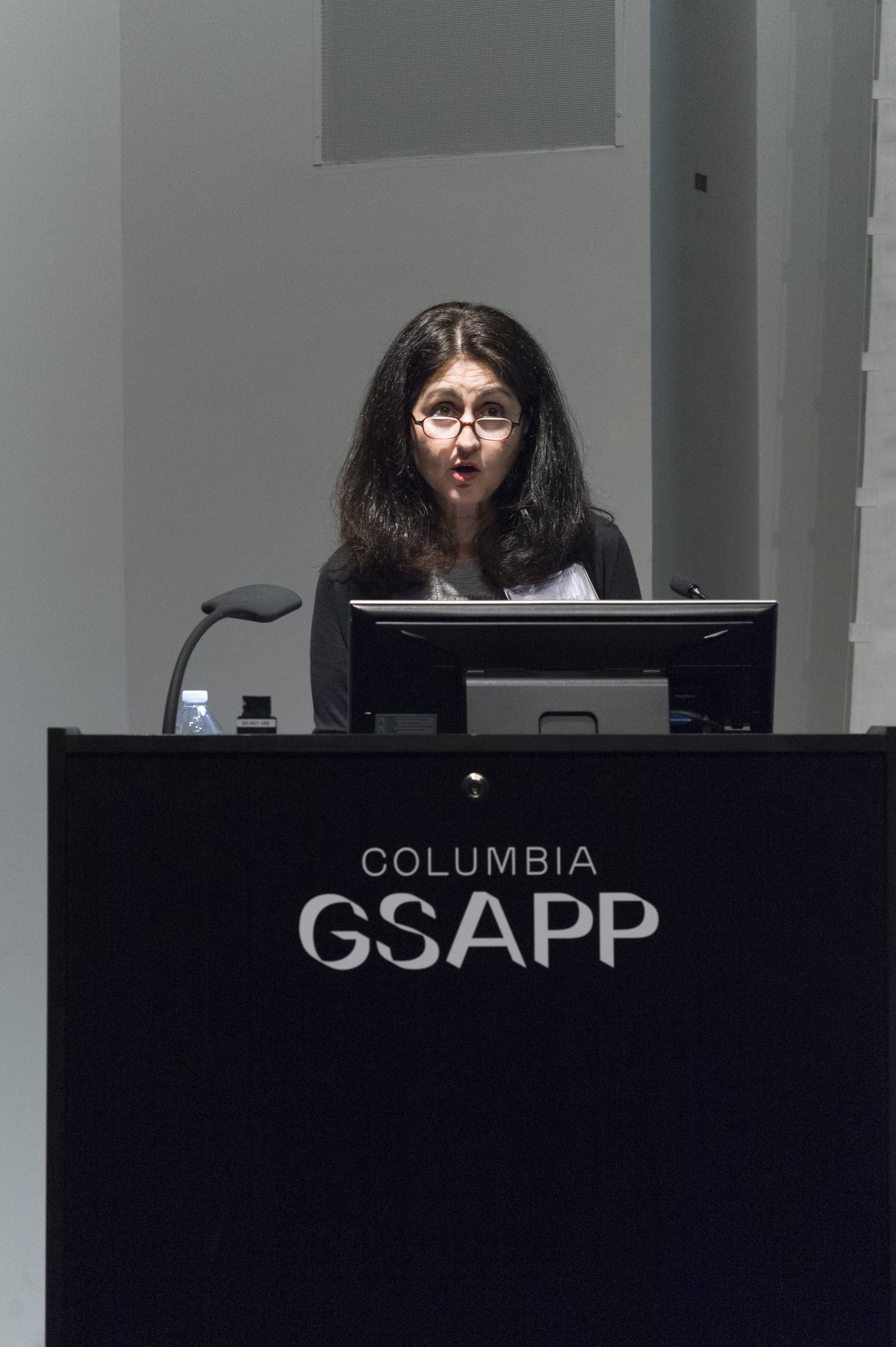
- Zainab Bahrani
- Born: 29 August 1962 (age 62); Baghdad, Iraq
- Education: New York University Institute of Fine Arts (MA, PhD)
- Occupation(s): Edith Porana Professor of Ancient Near Eastern Art and Archaeology
- Employer: Columbia University
- Awards: James Henry Breasted Prize (2009)

Zainab Bahrani (Arabic: زينب البحراني; born 29 August 1962) is an Iraqi Assyriologist and is Edith Porada Professor of Ancient Near Eastern Art and Archaeology at Columbia University. She was elected fellow of the American Academy of Arts and Sciences in 2020. In 2019 she was awarded an Andrew Carnegie Fellowship; she previously held a Guggenheim Fellowship in 2003. In 2009 she was awarded the James Henry Breasted Prize. Her book The Graven Image demonstrated "a complete overturning of Eurocentric representations of the cultural and artistic legacies of ancient Assyria and Babylonia".

== Early life and education ==
A native of Baghdad, Iraq, she was educated in Europe and the United States. She received her Master of Arts and doctoral degrees (Ph.D. 1989) in art history and archeology from New York University's Institute of Fine Arts.

== Career ==
Prior to her appointment at Columbia University, Bahrani taught at the University of Vienna in Austria, State University of New York at Stony Brook, and was a curator in the Metropolitan Museum of Art's Near Eastern Antiquities Department from 1989 to 1992. She was Slade Professor of Fine Art at the University of Oxford for 2010–11. On May 25, 2004, Bahrani was appointed to work with the Coalition Provisional Authority as Senior Consultant for Culture. She stated that her objective was to continue the reconstruction of the Iraq National Museum and the Iraq National Library. She also worked to restore documents to the National Archives of Iraq.

Bahrani has written widely on ancient near eastern art. Her book The Infinite Image was described by Matthew Canepa as a tool for "advocacy of the relevance of ancient Near Eastern art to contemporary art historical discourse, programs, and museums". In Scramble for the Past, edited by Bahrani, she also wrote a chapter which described how Ottoman and European colonial powers used the Assyrian past to meet their own "ideological goals". In reviewing The Graven Image archaeologist Jeremy Tanner described how Bahrani's book demonstrated "a complete overturning of Eurocentric representations of the cultural and artistic legacies of ancient Assyria and Babylonia", compounding the notion that the idea of 'Mesopotamia' itself is a colonial product. Bahrani's book The Ritual Body was reviewed by Carolyn Nakamura, who described it as "an illuminating and theoretically rich consideration of Assyro-Babylonian war and violence".

== Awards and recognition ==
Bahrani was elected fellow of the American Academy of Arts and Sciences in 2020. In 2019 she "was awarded an Andrew Carnegie Fellowship; she previously held a Guggenheim Fellowship in 2003. In 2009 she was awarded the James Henry Breasted Prize.

== Selected works ==
- Women of Babylon: Gender and Representation in Mesopotamia (Routledge, 2001)
- The Graven Image: Representation in Babylonia and Assyria (University of Pennsylvania Press, 2003)
- Rituals of War: The Body and Violence in Mesopotamia (New York, 2008)
- Zainab Bahrani, Zeynep Çelik, and Edhem Eldem, eds. Scramble for the Past: A Story of Archaeology in the Ottoman Empire. (Istanbul: SALT, 2011)
- The Infinite Image: Art, Time and the Aesthetic Dimension in Antiquity (Reaktion Books, 2014)
- War Essays (UCL Press, 2025). Downloadable open-access version here.
