= Bestansur =

Neolithic site in Iraq

- Location in Iraq
- 35°22′36″N 45°38′44″E
- Periods: Neolithic to Sasanian
- Location: Arbat, Sulaymaniyah Governorate, Iraq

History
- Built: c. 7700 BC
- Abandoned: c. 6350 BC

Site notes
- Archaeologists: Roger Matthews, Wendy Matthews, and Kamal Raheem

Bestansur is a Neolithic tell, or archaeological settlement mound, located in Arbat Town, Sulaimaniyah province, Kurdistan Region, Iraq in the western Zagros foothills. The site is located on the edge of the Shahrizor Plain, 30 km to the south-east of Sulaimaniyah. It is on the UNESCO World Heritage Tentative List.

== The site and its environment ==
Bestansur is a tell located on the left bank of the Tanjero River and near several other perennial and seasonal springs and streams in the Shahrizor Plain. This is an area that has been densely occupied throughout time, as evidenced by the many sites that have been recorded by archaeological surveys, including, for example, the large site of Yasintepe. Bestansur measures some 80–90 m in diameter and is 6 m high.

== History of research ==
The site was first examined by Ephraim Speiser in 1927 who noted that the pottery dated to before Persian times. The site was surveyed the Iraqi Directorate of Antiquities, and by the Shahrizor Survey Project (where Bestansur received the site number SSP 6). Excavations have been undertaken at Bestansur since 2012 by the University of Reading and the University of British Columbia, co-directed by Roger Mathews, Wendy Matthews, and Kamal Raheem. Surface survey has recorded evidence of a spread of Neolithic artefacts, including chert and obsidian. Test trenches were excavated to establish the extent of Early Neolithic occupation, which is thought to cover an area of 100 x 50 m. A gradiometry survey has recorded evidence for Neo-Assyrian activity.

Bestansur is on the UNESCO World Heritage Tentative List.

== Occupation history ==
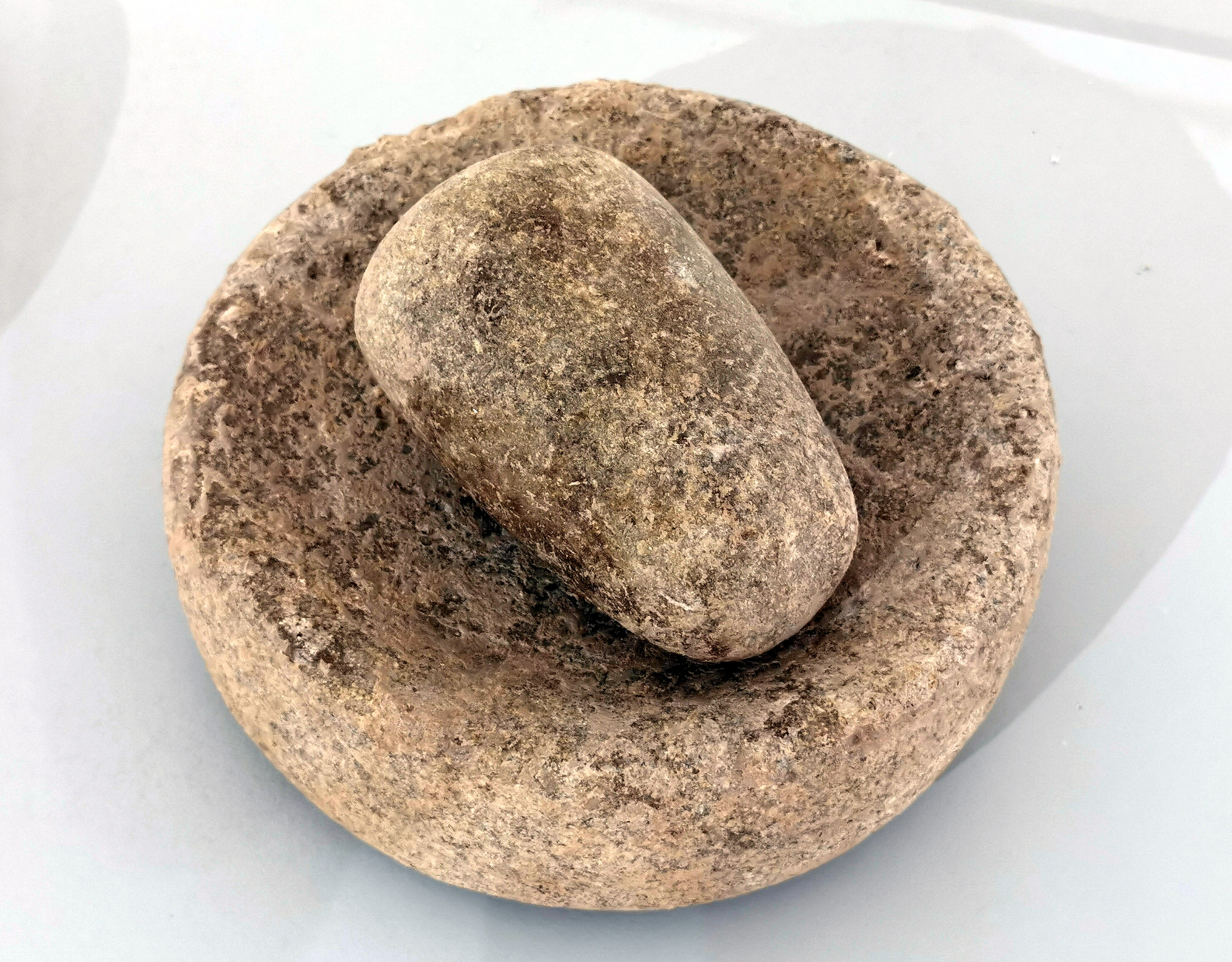
Pestle and mortar, found inside a kiln, c. 7650 BC from Bestansur

Occupation at Bestansur dates to the Early Neolithic period, 7600-7100 BC, and the Neo-Assyrian and Sasanian and Ottoman periods.

Occupation at the site consists of mud-brick and pisé rectangular buildings. The use of plaster has been recorded. An infrared microspectroscopic study of plasters and pigments discovered from Building 8 found evidence for red and black pigments. A large-porticoed building, Building 5, contained a large oven. Evidence for activities taking place in the external areas surrounding the buildings include hearths, butchery and stone-working waste. Numerous burials have been discovered beneath floors at the site, including 72 individuals beneath the floor of a single-room in Building 5.

The archaeological surface survey at the site also recorded pottery fragments dating to the seventh or early sixth millennium BC, based on well-stratified parallels found at sites like Tell Sabi Abyad, Tell Hassuna, and Jarmo. More specifically, the links with Sabi Abyad allowed for a date between 6500-6200 cal BC. One interesting fragment had an imprint of a textile net, making this some of the earliest evidence for textile imprints in Upper Mesopotamia. The exact use of the net could not be established, but a primary function as fishing net has been proposed based on the size of the net's meshes, and the location of Bestansur in a marshy environment with plenty of water resources. Fish are also depicted on painted Samarra and Halaf pottery vessels, indicating that fish must have been an important resource during this period.
