= Lisa-Marie Shillito =

British archaeologist

- Citizenship: United Kingdom
- Occupations: Lecturer, director of laboratory

Academic background
- Education: PhD Chemistry and Archaeology, University of Reading, 2008
- Thesis: Investigating traces of activities, diet and seasonality in middens at Neolithic catalhoyuk : An integration of microstratigraphic, phytolith and chemical analyses (2008)
- Doctoral advisor: Matthew Almond and Wendy Matthews

Academic work
- Discipline: Archaeology
- Sub-discipline: Archaeological science; geoarchaeology; landscape archaeology
- Institutions: Newcastle University
- Website: https://castlesandcoprolites.blogspot.com/

Lisa-Marie Shillito is a British archaeologist and senior lecturer in landscape archaeology as well as director of the Wolfson Archaeology Laboratory and Earthslides at Newcastle University. Her practical work focuses on using soil micromorphology, phytolith analysis and geochemistry in order to understand human behaviour and landscape change. Her work includes the Neolithic settlements of Çatalhöyük in Turkey and Ness of Brodgar and Durrington Walls in Britain, but also Crusader castles and medieval settlements in Poland and the Baltic and in the Near East.

Additionally, she is editor of The Archaeological Journal, assistant-editor of the journal Landscape Research, member of AHRC Peer Review College and member of the UKRI Future Leadership Fellows PRC.

== Education ==
Shillito started her education in archaeology at the University of Oxford, where she earned a BA (Hons) in geography. She completed a MSc in geoarchaeology at the University of Reading in 2004. Subsequently, she took on a PhD at the same university dealing with the geoarchaeological analysis of middens from Çatalhöyük in Turkey, which she completed in 2008. Results from this PhD research were published in various papers and a book in 2011. Alongside this PhD project, her job as a Research Assistant working in Geoarchaeology focused in particular on using FT-IR and other methods for studying residues from soil samples for analysis of organic lipids.

== Career and research ==
Since her PhD, Shillito has worked as a Research Associate in Archaeological Chemistry at the University of York between 2010 and 2012 and again at the University of Reading between 2012 and 2013. In 2013 she became a Research Fellow at the University of Edinburgh, until 2015. She took up a lecturer position at the University of Newcastle, which allowed her to organise a MSc curriculum in Geoarchaeology and direct the Wolfson Archaeology Laboratory.

Within all these different research positions, she managed to provide an interdisciplinary perspective using micromorphological, geochemical, phytolith and coprolite datasets to archaeological case studies from all across the world.

Since 2018 she is the head of the Earthslides facility: a lab for thin-section preparation and analysis for commercial clients and collaborative academic research into archaeological and geological questions.

== Selected publications ==
- Shillito, L.-M. and P. Ryan 2013. Surfaces and streets: phytoliths, micromorphology and changing use of space at Neolithic Çatalhöyük (Turkey), Antiquity 87, 684–700.
- Shillito, L.-M., W. Matthews, I.D. Bull, M.J. Almond, J.M. Williams and R.P. Evershed 2013. Integrated geochemical and microscopic analysis of human coprolites, animal dung and organic remains in burials. In: Hodder, I. (ed.) Humans and Landscapes of Çatalhöyük: reports from the 2000–2008 excavations, Los Angeles: Cotsen Institute Press (Çatalhöyük Research Project Series Volume 8. British Institute at Ankara Monograph No. 47/Monumenta Archaeologica 30), 75–79.
- Shillito, L.-M., W. Matthews, M.J. Almond and I.D. Bull 2011. The microstratigraphy of middens: capturing daily routine in rubbish at Neolithic Çatalhöyük, Turkey, Antiquity 85 (329), 1024–1038.
- Shillito, L.-M. 2011. Daily activities, diet and resource use at Neolithic Çatalhöyük : microstratigraphic and biomolecular evidence from middens, Oxford: Archaeopress (British Archaeological Reports: International series 2232).
- Shillito, L.-M., I.D. Bull, W. Matthews, M.J. Almond, J.M. Williams and R.P. Evershed 2011. Biomolecular and micromorphological analysis of suspected faecal deposits at Neolithic Çatalhöyük, Turkey, Journal of Archaeological Science 38, 1869–1877.
- Shillito, L.-M. and W. Matthews 2013. Geoarchaeological Investigations of Midden-Formation Processes in the Early to Late Ceramic Neolithic Levels at Çatalhöyük, Turkey ca. 8550-8370 cal BP, Geoarchaeology 28, 25–49.
- Shillito, L.-M., M.J. Almond, K. Wicks, L.-J.R. Marshall and W. Matthews 2009. The use of FT-IR as a screening technique for organic residue analysis of archaeological samples, Spectrochimica Acta Part A: Molecular and Biomolecular Spectroscopy 72, 120–125.
