= Arbat (town) =

Arbat عەربەت City of Three Gates
- Town
- Location in Iraq Arbat (Iraqi Kurdistan)
- Coordinates: 35°25′47.69″N 45°34′31.78″E
- Country: Iraq
- Region: Kurdistan Region
- Governorate: Sulaymaniyah
- Established: 1925

Government
  - Sub-District Administrator: Daban Arif

Population (2021)
  - Total: 30,000
- Time zone: UTC+3 (AST)
- Postal code: 46004
- Area code: +964
- Website: Official Facebook Page

Arbat is a town in Sulaymaniyah District, Sulaymaniyah Governorate, Kurdistan Region, Iraq., It's Sub-district is called "Arbat" which is also known as Tanjero Sub-district or the "City of Three Gates" (شاری سێ دەروازە), Arbat was established as a sub-district in 1925 during the reign of King Faisal I of Iraq by the administrators and authorities of that era. This town served as the administrative center of Tanjero Sub-district until August 23, 2025 when the name of Tanjero Sub-District was officially changed to (Arbat Sub-District).

== Geography ==
Tanjero Sub-district encompasses 71 villages and shares borders with several neighboring sub-districts: to the north with Siruchik Sub-district and Sitak Sub-district, to the south with Zarayen Sub-district and Central Qaradagh District, to the east with Saeed Sadiq Sub-district, and to the west with Bakrajo Sub-district. Arbat is situated in a mountainous region surrounded by the Zagros Mountains range. The climate of the area is generally Mediterranean, with hot summers (30-45 °C) and cold, rainy winters (0-10 °C). The annual rainfall ranges between 500-700 millimeters. Due to its geographical location, the soil in the area is fertile and suitable for agriculture.

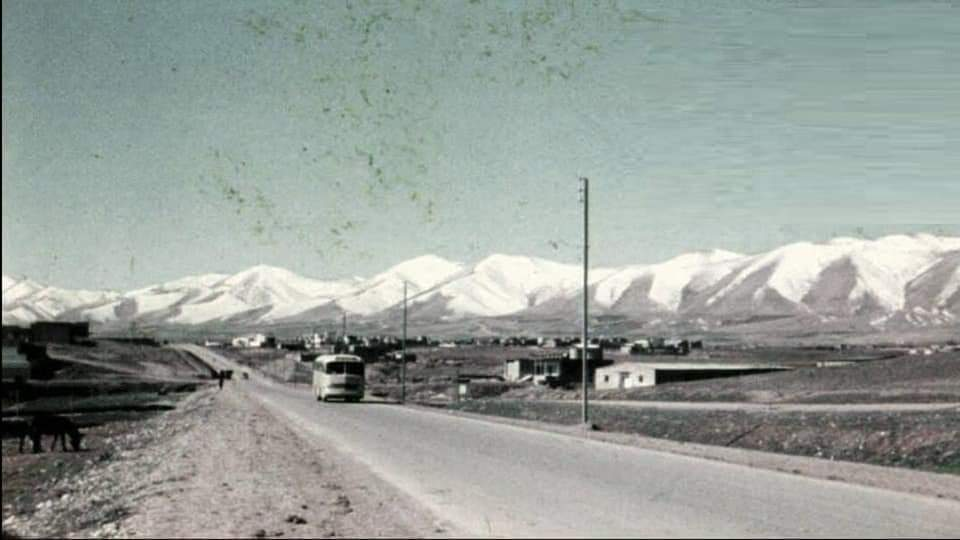
Old Arbat Road-1958.

=== Villages ===
Arbat consists of 71 villages:

- Arbat "Sub-district" (center)
- Bakhcha, Tanjero
- Bader
- Barika, Arbat
- Bardakar, Tanjero
- Bestan Suri Bchuk
- Bestan Suri Gawra
- Pushen
- Chaqlawa
- Chanakhchiyan
- Chuartaq
- Haris Awa
- Hamai Baram
- Khak u Khol, Tanjero
- Khraba
- Kharajian
- Darbarula, Tanjero
- Darash
- Darbandfoqara
- Damarkan
- Dai Ali
- Dai Baram
- Dai Ramazan
- Raziana, Tanjero
- Zargwez
- Zargwezala
- Zerinjoy Kharwu
- Zerinjoy Sarwu
- Zhalai Kharwu
- Zhalai Sarwu
- Sadubist, Tanjero
- Samawat
- Sulakan
- Shama
- Sheikh Awla
- Sheikh Omar
- Sheikh Waisawa
- Arifawa
- Farajawa
- Kazhaw
- Qarga
- Qisrti Kharwu
- Qisrti Sarwu
- Qaratoghan
- Qarali
- Karez, Tanjero
- Kazhawi Hamasalah
- Kani Shaswar
- Kani Hanjir, Tanjero
- Kani Wais
- Kamalani Kharwu
- Kamalani Sarwu
- Kozaraqa
- Kolabi
- Komalagai Barika
- Komalagai Tanjero
- Gameshawan
- Gadan
- Galbakh
- Gurgachia, Tanjero
- Gomaw, Tanjero
- Nawgrdan, Tanjero
- Namal
- Niskajo
- Hanjira, Arbat
- Hwana
- Welaka Kharwu
- Welaka Sarwu
- Weladar
- Yasin Tapa
- Yakhimali
- Yakmala

=== Climate (1992-2024) ===
Temperature and Precipitation Data (1992–2024)

Arbat Town, like other industrial towns in the Kurdistan Region of Iraq (KRG), has experienced significant climatic shifts over the past three decades.

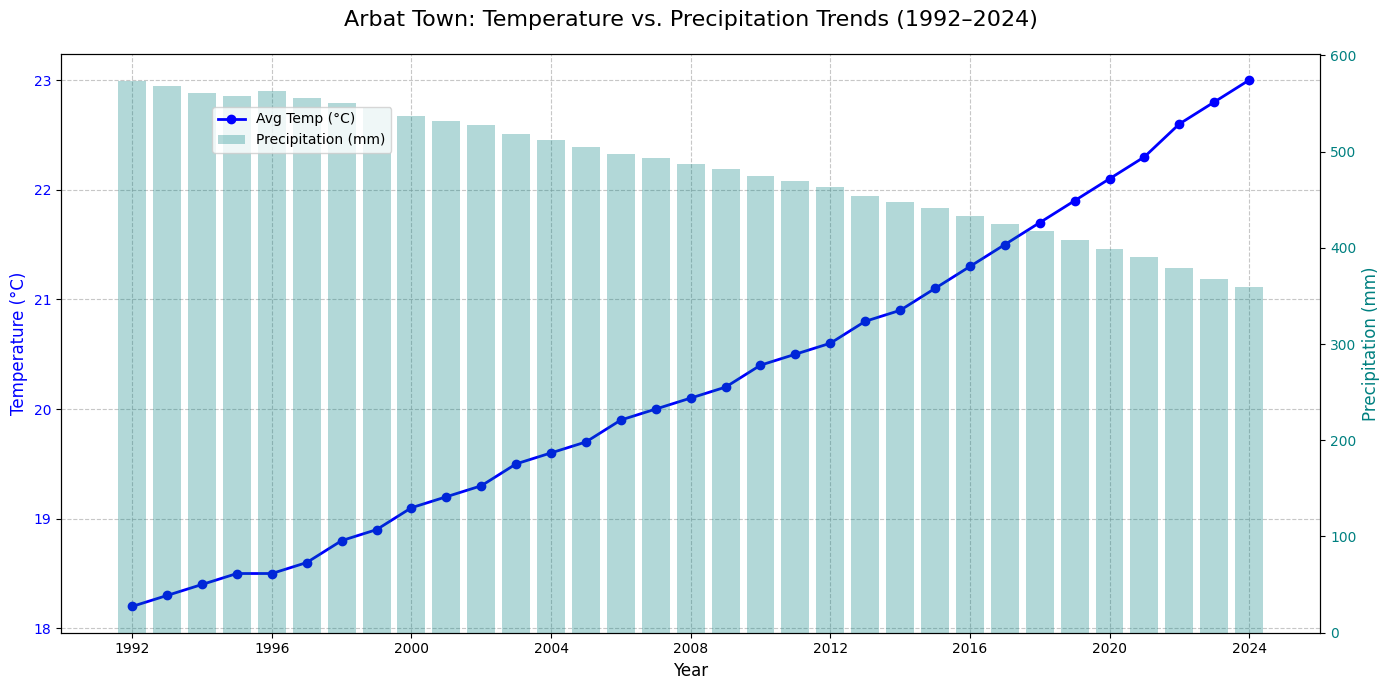
Temperature and precipitation trends in Arbat (1992–2024).

The graph shows stable temperature patterns but a marked decline in precipitation from 1992 to 2024.

Despite nearly steady temperature trends, rainfall dropped sharply, indicating changes in the local hydrological cycle.

Such precipitation decline could impact agriculture, water availability, and local biodiversity.

=== Climate Trends in Arbat Town (1992–2024) ===
The average annual temperature rose from 18.2 °C in 1992 to 23.0 °C in 2024 (+4.8 °C).

Average high temperatures increased from 24.6 °C to 29.6 °C (+5.0 °C).

Average low temperatures rose from 11.8 °C to 16.4 °C (+4.6 °C).

Precipitation dropped from 573mm in 1992 to 359mm in 2024—a 37.3% decrease.

Early data (1992–2000) is sourced from regional Sulaymaniyah weather stations due to limited local records.

== History and Archeology ==
=== Archeology ===
Arbat Hill, situated within Arbat Town in the Sulaymaniyah Governorate of the Kurdistan Region, is recognized as an important archaeological site associated with the Assyrian period, dated to approximately 1000 BCE. Local archaeological investigations have documented multiple cultural strata at the site, suggesting extended and potentially continuous occupation in the Shahrizor Plain region.

The site's position near the historical course of the Tanjero River offered both arable land and water resources, factors that likely contributed to its early settlement and strategic role in regional habitation patterns.

In proximity to Arbat, the Neolithic tell of Bestansur—located roughly 30 km southeast of Sulaymaniyah—has undergone extensive excavation since 2012. Findings at Bestansur have included early Neolithic mud-brick architecture, use of painted plaster in domestic contexts, subfloor human burials, and rare textile net impressions—interpreted by some researchers as possible fishing nets. These discoveries highlight the presence of early agricultural and aquatic subsistence strategies in the broader area.

While systematic excavations at Arbat Hill remain limited, preliminary findings underscore the site's archaeological value. Continued research may yield new insights into long-term settlement dynamics and cultural change in northeastern Mesopotamia.

=== History ===
1. Arbat was established as a sub-district in 1925 during the reign of King Faisal I of Iraq by the administrators and authorities of that era.
2. This town served as the administrative center of Tanjero Sub-district until August 23, 2025 when the name of Tanjero Sub-District was officially changed to (Arbat Sub-District).
3. According to historical sources, this area had a small population during the Ottoman Empire period and was known for the Tanjero River. However, in the early twentieth century, due to migration of people from surrounding villages to this area, the population increased, which led to economic growth in the region.
4. During the 1970s, due to Arabization policies and village relocations, many residents of surrounding villages were forced to move to Arbat and settle there. After the 1991 uprising and the establishment of the Kurdistan Regional Government, Arbat experienced significant development and became one of the most important towns in the Sulaymaniyah area.
5. On March 8, 1991, the 1991 Iraqi uprisings as known as (Raperin) began in Chamchamal, Halabja, and Arbat, military camps with (Zarayen, Sumud, Nasr, Barika, Piramagroon, and Allai).
6. The name "Arbat" in Kurdish language means "place of family" or "resting place". Some historical sources indicate that the name comes from the word "Araba" or "Arabana", which was a means of transportation in ancient times.

== Demographics ==
The majority of Arbat's residents speak the Sorani dialect, which is part of the Kurdish language. Most of the population are Muslims with other beliefs existing. According to the latest census (2021), Arbat's population is approximately 30,000 people.

== Economy ==
Arbat's economy relies on several main sectors:

=== Agriculture ===
Due to fertile soil and suitable climate, agriculture is one of the main sources of income for the area's residents. The main products include wheat, barley, vegetables, and fruits. The agricultural land area in the region is approximately 3,000 hectares.

=== Commerce ===
Due to proximity to Sulaymaniyah city, trade and commerce are important economic activities in the area. Arbat's central market includes approximately 300 shops and more than two malls commercial establishments.

=== Small Industry ===
In recent years, several small factories have been established in the area, providing employment for local residents. Arbat's industrial zone was established in 2012 and contains approximately 50 factories.

== Administration ==
The town of Arbat administratively falls under Arbat Sub-district, which belongs to Sulaymaniyah District, Sulaymaniyah Governorate. The sub-district consists of Arbat town as the center and 71 surrounding villages. The sub-district administrator is Daban Arif, appointed by the Kurdistan Regional Government.

== Culture and important sites ==
Several historical and tourist sites exist in the area, the most important being:

- Bestansur – A Neolithic settlement near Arbat dating to 7700–7100 BC, known for early mud-brick architecture, plastered walls, and evidence of early farming and textile use.
- Arbat Hill – An archaeological site from the Assyrian period (~1000 BC) with ongoing research revealing ancient settlement layers.
- Arbat Grand Mosque – Built in 1945 and renovated in 2005, it serves as a key religious and cultural landmark.
- Arbat Spring – A sulfur-rich natural spring believed to have healing properties, attracting visitors for therapeutic use.

== Infrastructure ==
Arbat serves as a significant hub for oil infrastructure. Arbat Airport is the largest agricultural airport in Iraq. The town hosts the Phoenix Refinery, which specializes in producing bitumen and various related products. Additionally, Arbat features a substantial oil storage and blending terminal with a 170,000 cubic meter capacity for various fuel types. A significant environmental concern is associated gas flaring at the Phoenix Refinery, contributing to air pollution and global warming. These oil activities are integrated into the Kurdistan Region's broader hydrocarbon landscape, facing challenges from regional disputes and export suspensions. The town of Arbat possesses basic infrastructure, including services for its local population and the significant refugee presence. Infrastructure development in Arbat has accelerated, partly in response to the needs of the refugee population, which has strained existing services like water and sanitation. The town's growing importance is also influenced by the presence of oil refinery and food industry companies. Despite these developments, still in some parts the region continues to rely on traditional sectors such as farming, agriculture, poultry, and dairy farming.

=== Transportation ===
The Arbat Agricultural Airport is a significant facility located in the Arbat district of Sulaymaniyah Governorate. It was established in 2005 and has primarily served civil and agricultural purposes. In 2018, the airport underwent a significant expansion, with its runways extended to 45 meters in width and 2 kilometers in length. This expansion made it the largest agricultural airport in Iraq. Today, the airport also functions as a training center, offering continuous piloting courses for aviation students. This training provides hands-on experience in aircraft operations and pilot training, contributing to the demand for skilled aviation professionals in the Kurdistan Region.

The town is connected to Sulaymaniyah via paved roads, making it accessible by car and public transportation. Its proximity to Sulaymaniyah provides residents with access to the services and facilities of the larger city.

In addition to handling civilian traffic, the airport is also used by the Counter-Terrorism Group (CTG) special forces.

== Notable people ==
Several well-known Kurdish personalities are from Arbat or have lived there:

- Karwan Mohammed (1984–): Kurdistan national football team player and former captain of Sulaymaniyah FC.
- Rewaz Fayeq: Kurdish female politician and former speaker of the Kurdistan Parliament.
- Mahir Hassan: Well-known Kurdish actor and theater artist.

== Cultural references ==
The name "Arbat" appears in several classical and old Kurdish poems and proverbs, whether for humor or philosophical and advisory (wisdom) purposes. Piramerd (Muhammad Tofiq Mahmud Bey Hamdi, 1867–1950), the great Kurdish poet and writer, mentioned "Arbat" in several of his poems and proverbs, including:

- "The tombstones are open letters from the afterlife written to the living."
- "That winding road of Kharajian is a path of deception for the fox of time."
- "The greed of wealth and the scorpions of Arbat have become a lesson for the people of meaning."

== See also ==
- Climate change in Iraq
- Refugees in Iraq
- Pollution in Iraq
- Sulaymaniyah Governorate
