= Jemdet Nasr =

Archaeological site in Iraq

- Location within Iraq Location within Near East
- 32°43′04″N 44°46′46″E
- Type: tell, archaeological site, type site
- Periods: Jemdet Nasr period, Ubaid period, Early Dynastic I, Uruk period
- Location: Iraq
- Region: Babylon Governorate

History
- Built: c. 3250 BC
- Abandoned: c. 3000 BC

Site notes
- Height: 2.9 metre, 3.5 metre
- Area: 1.5 hectare, 7.5 hectare
- Excavation dates: 1926, 1928, 1988-1989
- Archaeologists: Stephen Herbert Langdon, Louis-Charles Watelin, Roger Matthews
- Discovered: 1926

Jemdet Nasr (Arabic: جمدة نصر) (also Jamdat Nasr and Jemdat Nasr) is a tell or settlement mound in Babil Governorate, Iraq that is best known as the eponymous type site for the Jemdet Nasr period (c. 3100–2900 BC), under an alternate periodization system termed the Uruk III period, and was one of the oldest Sumerian cities. It is adjacent to the much larger Neo-Babylonian and Sassanian site of Tell Barguthiat (also Tell Bargouthiat) to the northeast. The site was first excavated in 1926 by Stephen Langdon, who found Proto-Cuneiform clay tablets in a large mudbrick building thought to be the ancient administrative centre of the site. A second season took place in 1928, but this season was very poorly recorded. Subsequent excavations in the 1980s under British archaeologist Roger Matthews were, among other things, undertaken to relocate the building excavated by Langdon. These excavations have shown that the site was also occupied during the Ubaid, Uruk and Early Dynastic I periods. Based on texts found there mentioning an ensi of NI.RU that is thought to be its ancient name. During ancient times the city was on a canal linking it to other major Sumerian centers.

== Archaeology ==
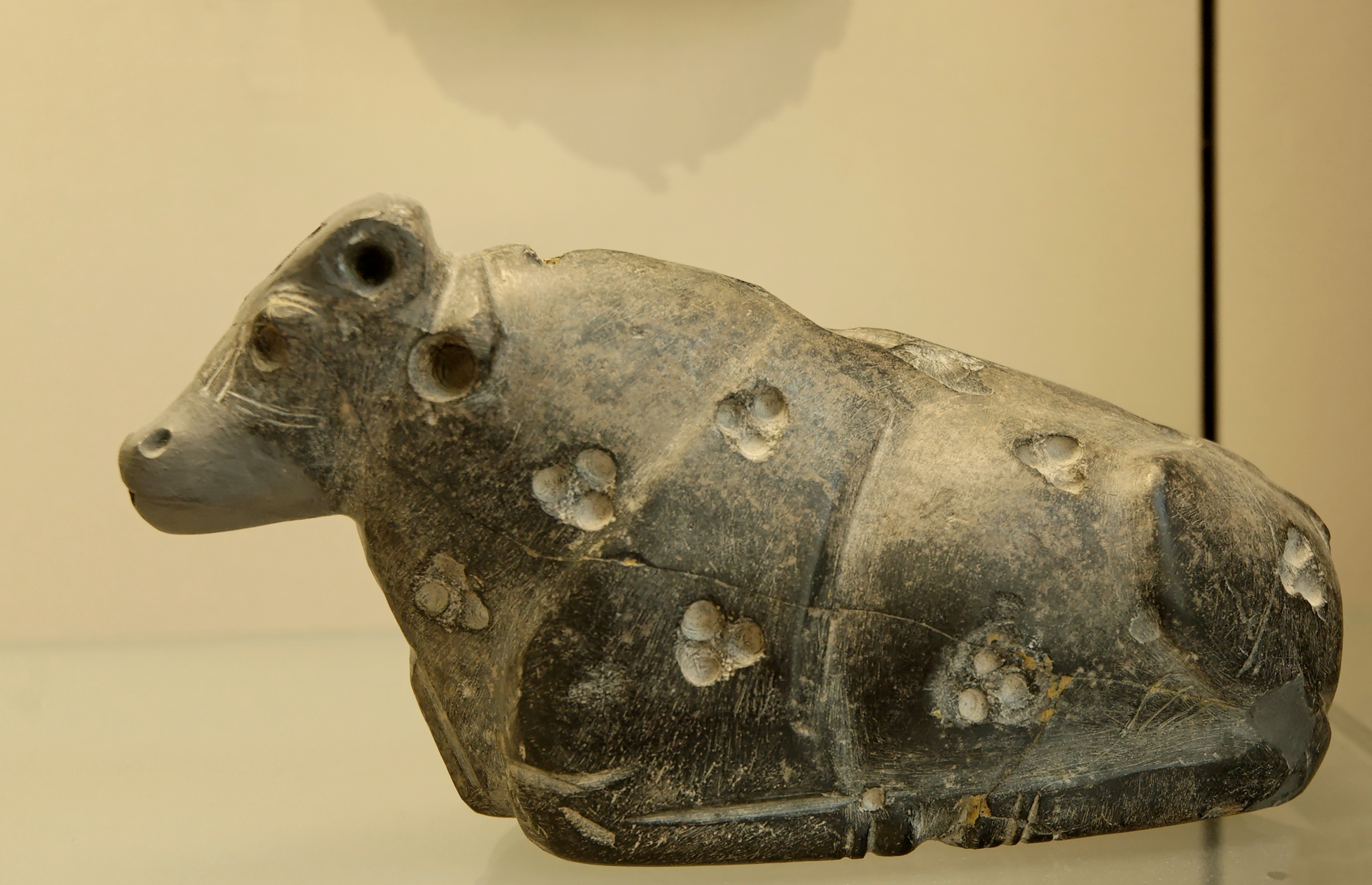
Sitting bull Louvre AO7021

In 1925, the team that was excavating at Kish received reports that clay tablets and painted pottery had been found by locals at a site called Jemdet Nasr, some 26 kilometres (16 mi) northeast of Kish. The site was subsequently visited on 6 January 1926 by Langdon and Henry Field and it was decided that an excavation was necessary after several pictographic tablets were found. Some burnt grain were recovered and later determined to be cone wheat (Triticum turgidum) the earliest exemplar of that in the region. The first season at Jemdet Nasr took place in 1926, directed by Stephen Langdon, professor of Assyriology at Oxford University and director of the excavations at Kish. The excavation lasted over a month and employed between 12 and 60 workmen. Langdon was not an archaeologist, and even by the standards of his time, as exemplified by Leonard Woolley's work at Ur, his record-keeping was very poor. He contracted a fever at Jemdet Nasr from which he never fully recovered, which ended the excavation season. As a result, much information on the exact find spots of artefacts, including the tablets, was lost. A large, 4,500 square meter (92 meters by 48 meters) mudbrick building was excavated in which a large collection of proto-cuneiform clay tablets was found. The bricks used were of the Riemchen (20 X 8 5 x 8 cm) and Flachziegel (23 x 9 x 6 5 cm) types, with some of the former baked and all of the latter. All baked bricks were pierced with three one centimeter holes before baking. The finds from this season were divided between the National Museum of Iraq in Baghdad, the Ashmolean Museum in Oxford and the Field Museum in Chicago; the latter two co-sponsors of the excavations in Kish and Jemdet Nasr. A second season was organized in 1928, lasting between 13 and 22 March and directed by L.Ch. Watelin, the then-field director at Kish, accompanied by Henry Field. This time, some 120 workmen were employed. Excavation ended after 11 days (of the 20 planned) due to a plague of locusts. Watelin kept almost no records of his excavations at the site but from the few notes that survive he seems to have been digging in the same area as Langdon.

In 1988 and 1989, two further excavation seasons were carried out under the direction of British archaeologist Roger Matthews. The aims of the 1988 season were to conduct an archaeological survey of the site, to revisit the large building on Mound B that had been excavated by Langdon but very poorly published, and to explore a Neo-Babylonian or later baked brick building that was visible on the surface of Mound A. During the 1989 season, again directed by Matthews, a dig-house was constructed on the site. Research focused on Mound B with the aim to further explore the ancient occupation in that area. No work was carried out on Mound A. Further excavation seasons, although planned, were prevented by the outbreak of the Gulf War in 1990 and no fieldwork has been carried out at the site since then. The excavation archives for this dig are still in Baghdad but field photographs have now been digitized.

The importance of the findings at Jemdet Nasr were immediately recognized after the 1920s excavations. During a large conference in Baghdad in 1930, the Jemdet Nasr period was inserted into the Mesopotamian chronology between the Uruk period and the Early Dynastic period, with Jemdet Nasr being the eponymous type site. Since then, the assemblage characteristic for the Jemdet Nasr period has been attested at other sites in south–central Iraq, including Abu Salabikh, Fara, Nippur, Ur and Uruk. The period is now generally dated to 3100–2900 BC.

== Jemdet Nasr and its environment ==
The name Jemdet Nasr translates as "Small mound of Nasr", named after a prominent sheikh in the early twentieth century. Jemdet Nasr is located in modern-day Babil Governorate in central Iraq, or ancient southern Mesopotamia. Before the implementation of the Musaiyib irrigation project in the 1950s, the site lay in a semi-desert area. Today, the site is located in an area that is heavily irrigated for agriculture. The tell consists of three mounds, A, B, and C, that are located adjacent to each other. Mound A is 160 by 140 metres (520 by 460 ft), 2.9 metres (9 ft 6 in) high and has a total area of 1.5 hectares (3.7 acres). Mound B, located immediately to the northeast of A, measures 350 by 300 metres (1,150 by 980 ft) for a total area of 7.5 hectares (19 acres), reaching up to 3.5 metres (11 ft) above the modern level of the plain. Mound C lies about 500 meters to the east of Mound B and is largely made up of baked brick fragments with a few Islamic period sherds found on the surface.

== Occupation history ==
Occupation is thought to have started at least in the Ubaid period and occupied until the Early Dynastic I period. The Ubaid occupation of the site has not been explored through excavation but is inferred from pottery dating to that period, and clay sickles and a fragment of a clay cone, that were found on the surface of Mound A. Both the 1920s as well as the 1980s excavations have resulted in considerable quantities of Middle Uruk period (mid-4th millennium BC) pottery. It seems that during this period, both Mounds A and B were occupied. During the Late Uruk period (late 4th millennium BC), an extensive settlement must have existed at Mound B, but its nature is again hard to ascertain due to a lack of well-excavated archaeological contexts.

The Jemdet Nasr period settlement (3100–2900 BC) extended over an area of 4–6 hectares (9.9–14.8 acres) of Mound B. Some 0.4 hectares (0.99 acres) was occupied by the single, large mudbrick building that was excavated by Langdon, and where the clay tablets were found. In and around this building, kilns for firing pottery and baking bread were found, and other crafts like weaving. Many of these crafts, and also agricultural production, feature prominently in the proto-cuneiform tablets – indicating that much of the economy was centrally controlled and administered. In the texts from Jemdet Nasr, the term "SANGA AB" appears, which may denote a high official. The building was probably destroyed by fire. There is no evidence for far-reaching trade-contacts; no precious stones or other exotic materials were found. However, the homogeneity of the pottery that is typical for the Jemdet Nasr period suggests that there must have been intensive regional contacts. This idea is strengthened by the finding of sealings on the tablets of Jemdet Nasr that list a number of cities in southern Mesopotamia, including Larsa, Nippur, Ur, Uruk and Tell Uqair.

After the destruction of the Jemdet Nasr building, occupation of the site seems to have continued uninterrupted, as pottery forms show a gradual transition from Jemdet Nasr forms into the Early Dynastic I repertoire. At least one building of this period has been excavated at Mound B. Based on the distribution of Early Dynastic pottery on the surface, the settlement seems to have been smaller than during the Jemdet Nasr period. A single Early Dynastic I grave was found on Mound A, but no further evidence for occupation during this period. The building that was visible on the surface of the mound was probably a Parthian fortress, but due to a lack of well-dated pottery from this area this dating could not be ascertained.

== Material culture ==
Apart from the proto-cuneiform tablets, Jemdet Nasr gained fame for its painted polychrome and monochrome pottery. Painted pots display both geometric motifs and depictions of animals, including birds, fish, goats, scorpions, snakes and trees. However, the majority of the pottery was undecorated, and the fact that most painted pottery seems to have come from the large central building suggests that it had a special function. Pottery forms included large jars, bowls, spouted vessels and cups.

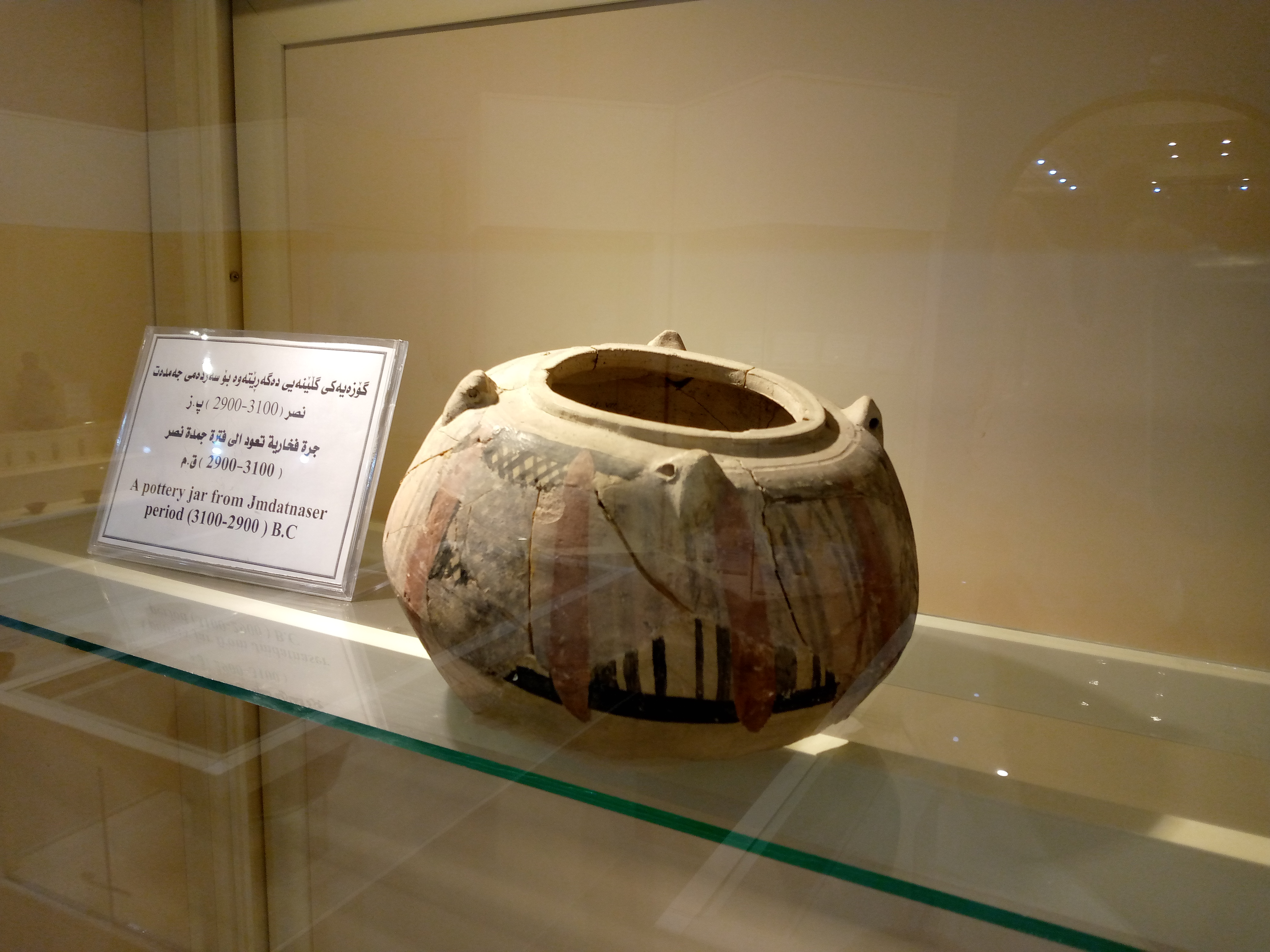
A pottery jar from Jemdet Nasr period (3100–2900) BC Erbil Civilization Museum

A number of cylinder seals, stamp seals and cylinder seal impressions on the clay tablets have been found at Jemdet Nasr. Stylistically, these seals are a continuation of the preceding Uruk period. The cylinder seals display humans as well as animals in a very crude style. Over 80 of the clay tablets bore a sealing, showing humans, animals, buildings, containers and more abstract designs. None of the sealings on the tablets was made by the seals that were found at the site, indicating that sealing either occurred outside Jemdet Nasr or that seals could also be made of perishable materials. One sealing, found on thirteen tablets, lists the names of a number of cities surrounding Jemdet Nasr, including Larsa, Nippur, Ur and Uruk.

The exact findspots of many objects retrieved during the 1920s excavations could no longer be reconstructed due to the poor publication standards, so that many can only be dated by comparing them with what has been found at other sites that do have a good stratigraphy and chronological control. Many of the objects found during the 1920s could be dated from the Uruk period to the Early Dynastic I period. Very few copper objects were found in Jemdet Nasr. These included an adze, a fish-hook and a small pendant in the shape of a goose. A particular type of stone vessel with ledge handles and a rim decorated by incised rectangles has so far not been found at any other site. The function of a number of flat polished stones incised with lines forming a cross is uncertain, but it has been suggested that they were used as bolas. They are common in Uruk period sites. Because clay as a raw material is widely available around Jemdet Nasr, clay objects are very common. Clay objects included baked clay bricks, clay sickles, fragments of drain pipes, spatulas, spindle whorls and miniature wagon wheels. Beads, small pendants and figurines were made of bone, shell, stone, clay and frit.

=== Proto-cuneiform texts ===
The clay tablets that were reported to the excavators of Kish in 1925 may not have been the first to come from Jemdet Nasr. Already before 1915, a French antiquities dealer had bought tablets that reportedly came from the site through looting. He sold them in lots to the French dealer Dumani Frères, the Louvre and the British Museum, while those resold to Dumani Frères were subsequently purchased by James Breasted for the Oriental Institute in Chicago. Another group of tablets was purchased in Kish in the 1930s and of these it was asserted that they came from Jemdet Nasr, although this is unlikely due to stylistic differences between these tablets and those excavated at Jemdet Nasr in 1926. During the first regular excavation season in 1926, between 150 and 180 tablets were found in Mound B; the error margin resulting from gaps in the administration kept by the excavators. Some of these tablets may actually have come from the 1928 excavations under Watelin. The tablets from the regular excavations are stored in the Ashmolean Museum in Oxford and the National Museum of Iraq in Baghdad. Two Uruk V period (c. 3500-3350 BC) clay tablets, called "numerical tablets" or "impressed tablets", were found at the site.

The Jemdet Nasr tablets are written in proto-cuneiform script. Proto-cuneiform is thought to have arisen in the second half of the 4th millennium BC. While at first it was characterized by a small set of symbols that were predominantly pictographs, by the time of the Jemdet Nasr period, there was already a trend toward more abstract and simpler designs. It is also during this period that the script acquired its iconic wedge-shaped appearance. While the language in which these tablets were written cannot be identified with certainty, it is thought to have been Sumerian. Contemporary archives have been found at Uruk, Tell Uqair and Khafajah.

The tablets from Jemdet Nasr are primarily administrative accounts; long lists of various objects, foodstuffs and animals that were probably distributed among the population from a centralized authority. Thus, these texts document, among other things, the cultivation, processing and redistribution of grain, the counting of herds of cattle, the distribution of secondary products like beer, fish, fruit and textiles, as well as various objects of undefinable nature. Six tablets deal with the calculation of agricultural field areas from surface measurements, which is the earliest attested occurrence of such calculations.

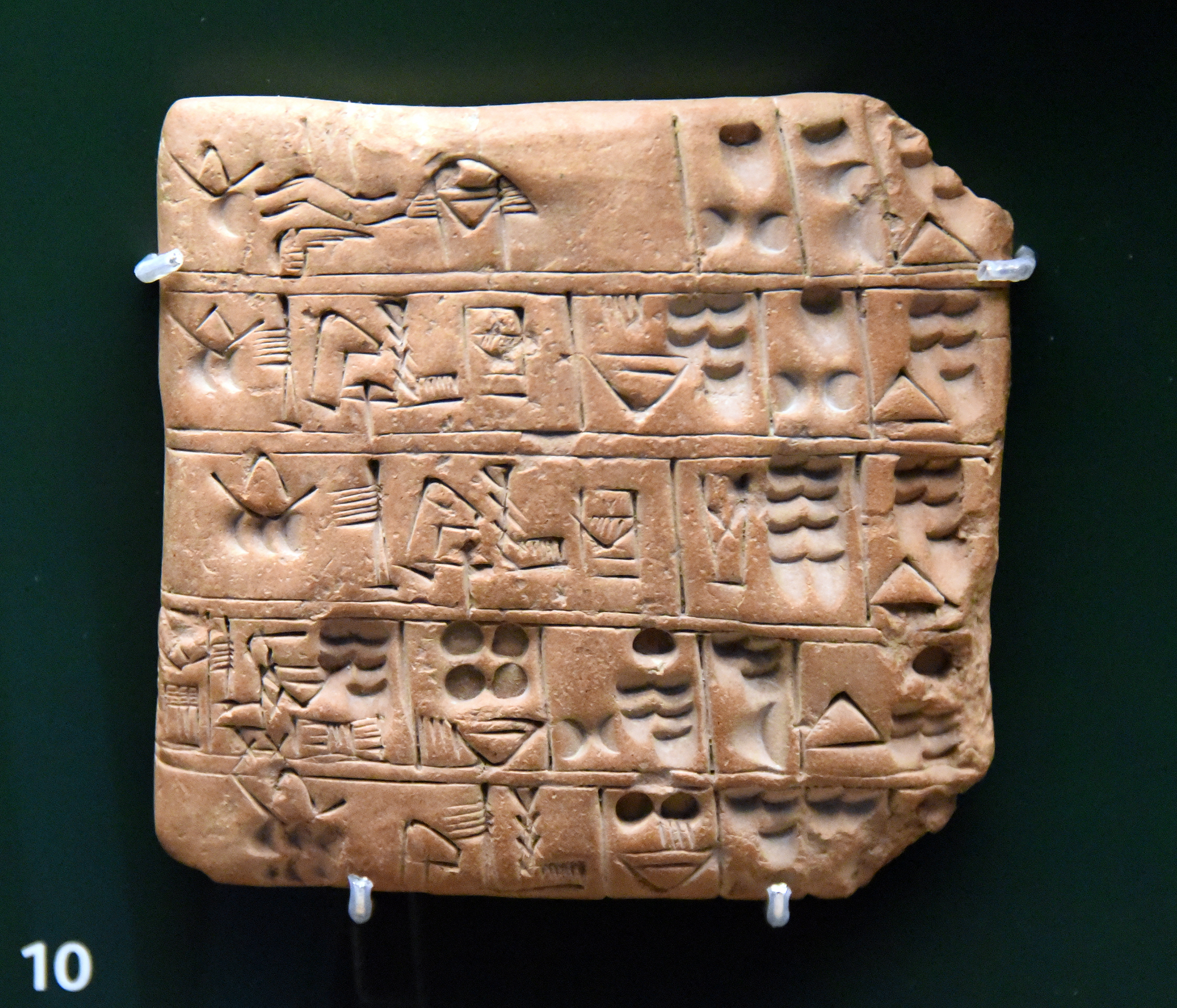
A five-day ration list. Each line of proto-cuneiform text mentions rations for one day. The sign for "day" and the numbers 1-5 are easily identifiable. Probably from Jemdet-Nasr, Iraq. Circa 3000 BCE. British Museum.

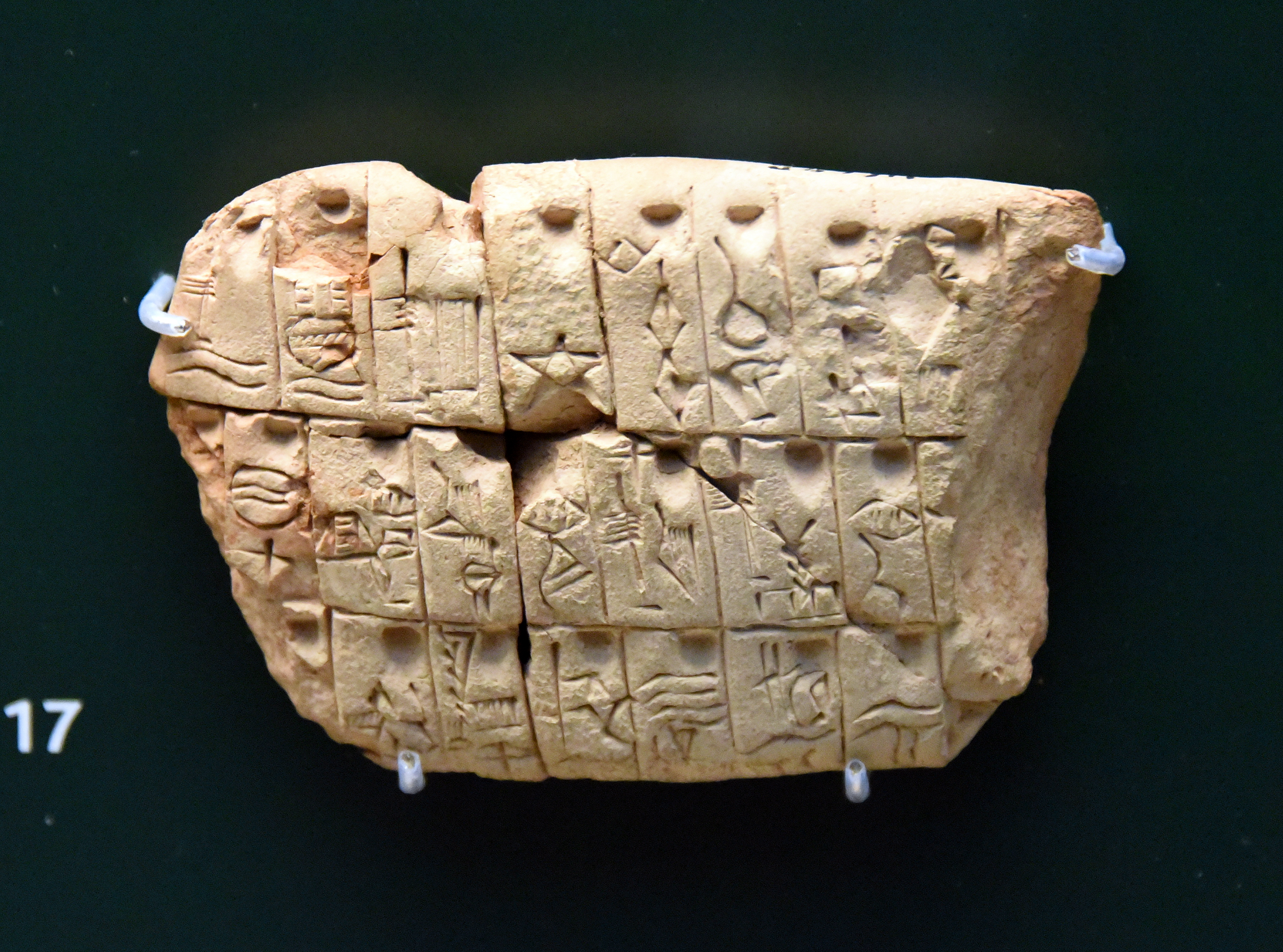
Apprentice scribes learned the writing system through lists of related signs, like this one dealing with place names. From Jemdet-Nasr, Iraq. 3000-2900 BCE. British Museum.

== See also ==
- Ancient City Seals
- Cities of the Ancient Near East
- Kullaba
