= Tanjaro =

River in Kurdistan, Iraq

Location
- Country: Iraq
- Region: Kurdistan Region
- Cities: Sulaymaniyah

Physical characteristics
- Source: Confluence of Kiliasan and Kani-Ban
  - coordinates: 35°29′35″N 45°23′22″E
  - elevation: 680 m (2,230 ft)
- Mouth: Darbandikhan Dam
  - coordinates: 35°16′35″N 45°51′9″E
- Length: 58 km (36 mi)

The Tanjaro (Kurdish: تانجەرۆ), also spelled Tanjero, is a river in the Kurdistan Region in Iraq. It arises in Arbat Town near the city Sulaymaniyah through the confluence of the rivers Kiliasan and Kani-Ban and flows into the Darbandikhan Dam reservoir after 58 kilometers.

== Neolithic site of Bestansur ==
Bestansur is an archaeological site on the left bank of the river occupied during the Neolithic period. A sherd dated to 6500–6200 cal BC with an imprint of a possible fishing net has been found there, indicating the exploitation of riverine resources.

== Pollution ==
Due to the discharge of untreated wastewater and industrial wastewater, as well as wild garbage dumps in the bank area, the river is heavily polluted by heavy metals and other pollutants. Agriculture also suffers from water pollution because the water is no longer suitable for irrigating the fields. In the Darbandichan reservoir, pollution from the Tanjero periodically leads to fish kill in Summer.
