= The Archaeological Journal =

Peer-reviewed academic journal

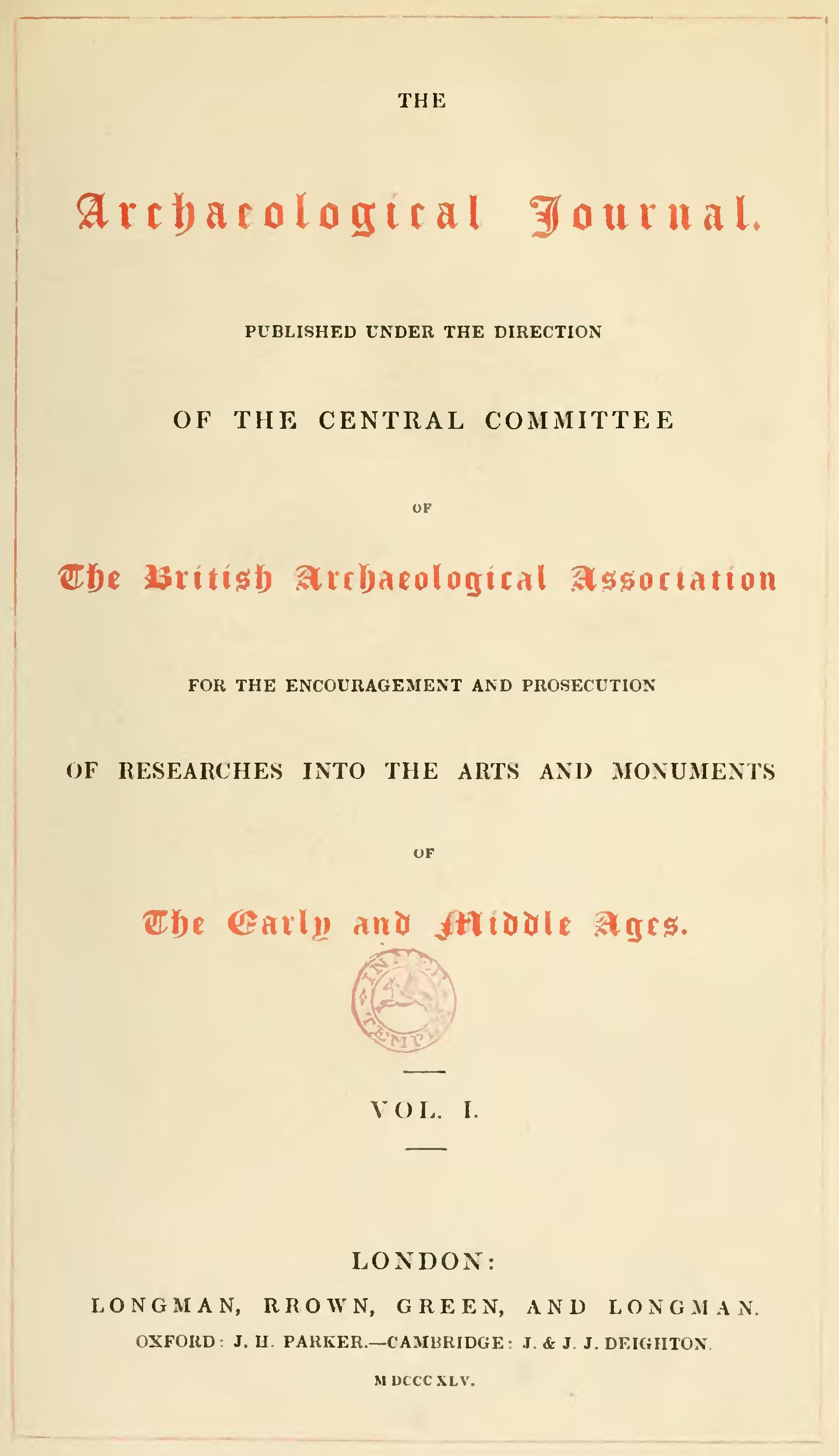
- Title page of the first issue, 1845
- Discipline: Archaeology, architecture
- Language: English
- Edited by: Rhiannon Stevens

Publication details
- History: 1844-present
- Publisher: Taylor and Francis for the Royal Archaeological Institute (United Kingdom)
- Frequency: Annual

Standard abbreviations
- ISO 4: Archaeol. J.

Indexing
- ISSN: 0066-5983
- LCCN: 09004053
- OCLC no.: 755934814

Links
- Journal homepage; Online access

The Archaeological Journal is a peer-reviewed academic journal for archaeological and architectural reports and articles. It was established in 1844 by the British Archaeological Association as a quarterly journal, but was taken over by the British Archaeological Institute (now known as the Royal Archaeological Institute) in 1845, and the institute has remained its publisher ever since. The journal has been published annually since 1927.

== History ==
The Archaeological Journal was established as a quarterly journal of the British Archaeological Association in 1844. When conflicts within that association led to the foundation of the rival British Archaeological Institute (now the Royal Archaeological Institute) in 1845, the Institute retained the journal, the Association instead publishing the Journal of the British Archaeological Association. Publication was quarterly (sometimes falling to twice or three times a year) until 1926. In 1927 the journal became an annual publication. From volume 51 (1894), issues bore the notice "second series".

== Publication history ==
The publisher of the journal has been variously listed as:

- 1844: Central Committee of the British Archaeological Association
- 1845–66: Central Committee of the Archaeological Institute of Great Britain and Ireland
- 1867 – Sept. 1875: Central Committee of the Royal Archaeological Institute of Great Britain and Ireland
- Dec. 1875 – 1929: Council of the Royal Archaeological Institute of Great Britain and Ireland
- 1930–59: Royal Archaeological Institute of Great Britain and Ireland
- 1960–2015: Royal Archaeological Institute
- 2015–present: Taylor and Francis on behalf of the Royal Archaeological Institute

== Editors ==
The earliest volumes do not list a named individual as editor, however volume 1 (1844) contains an introduction to the journal by Albert Way, who is listed as Honorary Secretary, and following volumes are attributed to the Central Committee (up to volume 24) or Council (from volume 25). The annual report for Volume 100 (1943) mentions Philip Corder as resigning as editor, with C.F.C Hawkes taking the role on from Volume 101. V.M Dallas is mentioned as joint honorary editor 1953–1956 in the council report for volume 120 (1963). The journal includes a list of officers and council members including the named editor from volume 121 (1964).

- Vols 121–123: C.F. Stell
- Vols 124–125: J. Forde-Johnston
- Vols 126–132: M.J. Swanton
- Vols 133–137: David Parsons
- Vols 138–143: P. J. Reynolds
- Vols 144–148: R. T. Schadla-Hall
- Vols 149–151: Martin Millett
- Vol. 154: Blaise Vynver
- Vols 155–156: Blaise Vynver and Helena Hamerow
- Vols 157–159: Helena Hamerow
- Vols 160–164: M. F. Gardiner
- Vols 165–168: Patrick Ottaway
- Vols 169–174: Howard Williams
- Vols 175–179: Lisa-Marie Shillito
- Current: Rhiannon Stevens
