= Mahir Hassan =

Kurdish actor

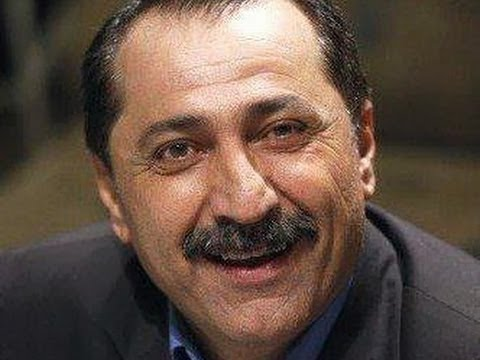
- Born: January 10, 1963 (age 63); Arbat Town, Sulaymaniyah, Kurdistan region.
- Education: Fine arts (1985)
- Occupation: Actor
- Years active: 1979–present

Mahir Hassan (Kurdish: ماهیر حەسەن, Mahîr Hassan; born on January 10, 1963) in Arbat Town. is a Kurdish actor and playwright, known for the film Star Rebellion.

== Early life ==
He completed his primary, secondary and high school education in Sulaymaniyah, visited there on several occasions with his father, later settled in Sulaymaniyah from Arbat Town, then completed his secondary education and began his artistic career in the 4th year, when he went to the fine arts Institute in Sulaymaniyah. He graduated from the Theater Department and was awarded the Best Actor Award in the same year.

== Career ==
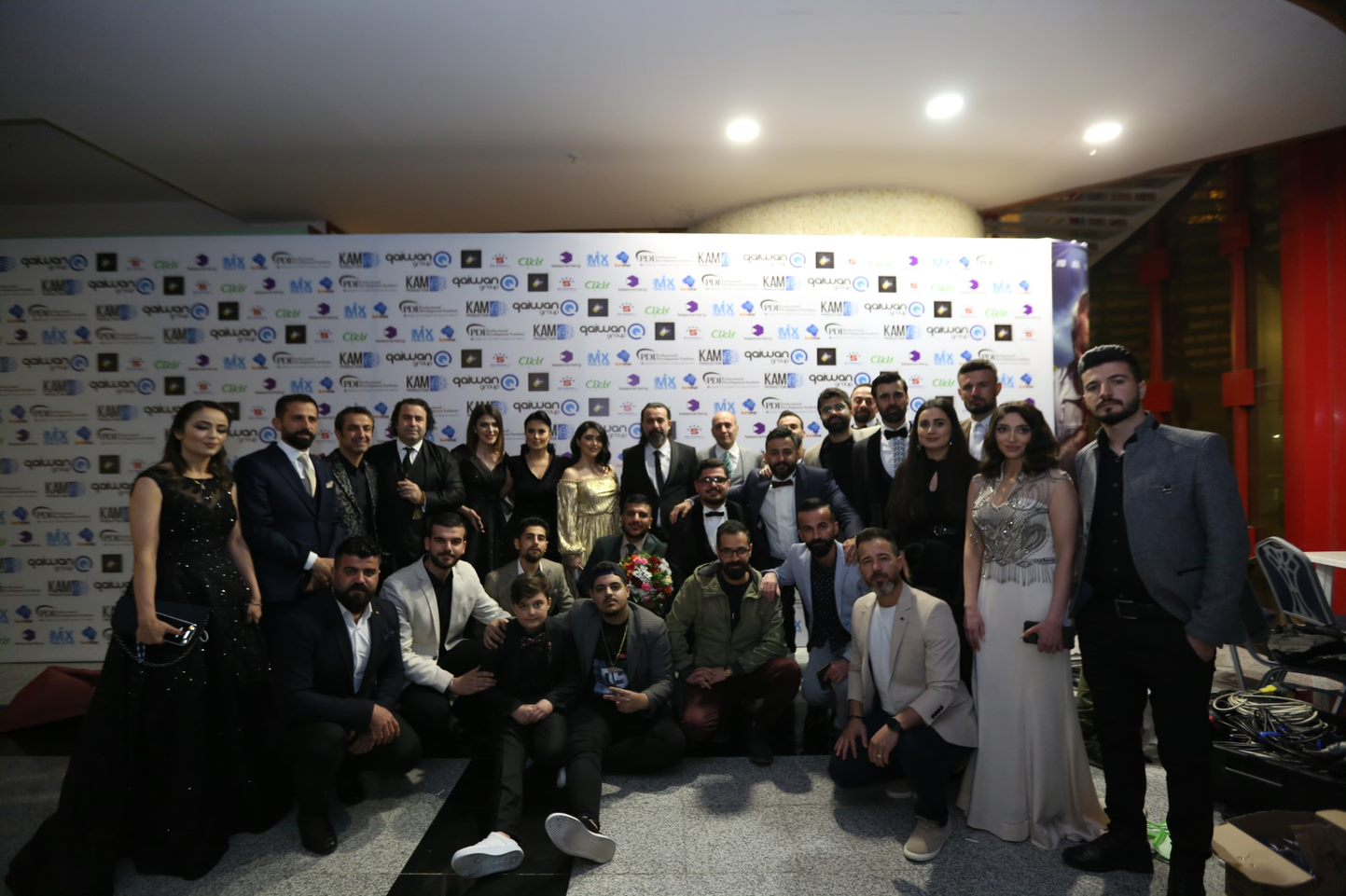
Cast of the movie 09 at the premiere

He participated in more than 4 art productions, including the first production of the play JJ (the working-class eye of the workers at the hands of Agha and Darabagh). His best-known products include Star Rebellion, Humor, Patriot, Famous House, Black Luck, Fantalos, and Kashkol.
