= Erbil Civilization Museum =

Archaeological museum in Erbil, Kurdistan, displaying ancient artifacts

Erbil Civilization Museum متحف أربيل الحضاري
- مۆزەخانەی شارستانیی ھەولێر
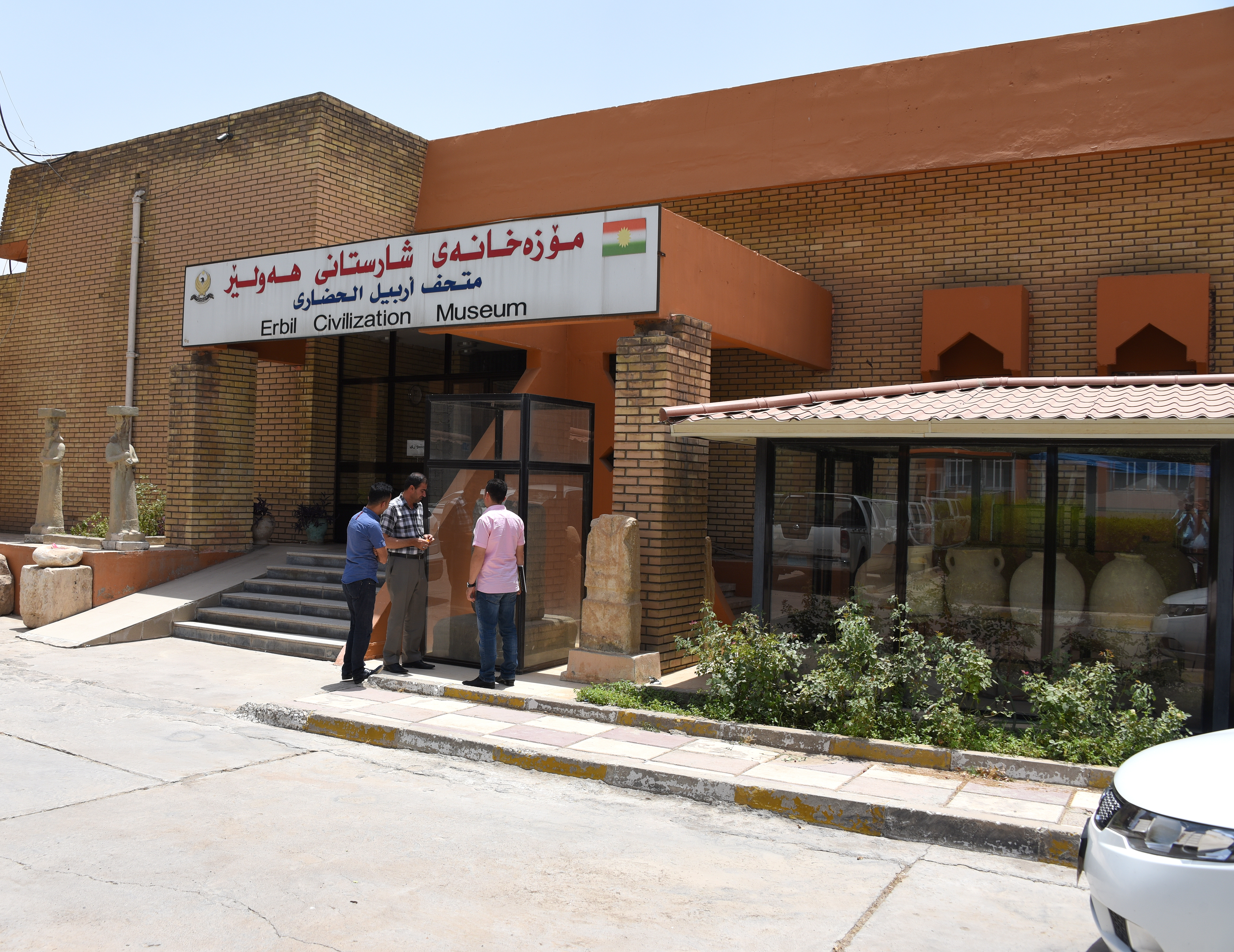
- Erbil Civilization Museum
- Established: 1 January 1960
- Location: Erbil, Erbil Governorate, Kurdistan Region, Iraq
- Coordinates: 36.1772°N 44.0134°E
- Type: Archaeological museum
- Key holdings: Incense burner (Hurrian period, 1300-1000 BC), Temple foundation cone of Gudea (Ur III period), Pottery jar from Halaf period (4900-4300 BC), among others.
- Collections: Artifacts from the pre-historic period to the late Islamic period, including Mesopotamian, Urartian, Assyrian, and Islamic items.

The Erbil Civilization Museum (Kurdish: مۆزەخانەی شارستانیی ھەولێر, Arabic: متحف أربيل الحضاري) is an archeological museum which is located within the city of Hawler, the capital of Iraqi Kurdistan. It is the second largest museum in Iraqi Kurdistan, after the Sulaymaniyah Museum in Sulaymaniyah Governorate in terms of contents and collections. It houses artifacts which date back to the pre-historic period to the late Abbasid period.

== History ==
The very first building of the Museum was established in mid-1960 and contained few artifacts. The building was small and was located within the heart of the city of Hawler, at the Minarah district. The, then, Erbil Archaeological Inspection Directorate was responsible for administering the museum. In the mid-1970s, the museum building was relocated into the Citadel of Erbil. The museum was administered by the General Directorate of Archaeology in Baghdad. After then, many artifacts, from different ancient periods were transferred from the Iraqi Museum in Baghdad to the museum as a permanent loan. The content and collections of the museum grew tremendously.

Another project to establish a new building was started in 1985 to accommodate the increasing number of artifacts. The current building was opened in 1989, after the end of the Iraq-Iran war (1980-1988) and lies close to the ancient tell of Qalinj Agha. After the invasion of Kuwait (by the Iraqi Army) in 1990, the Kurdish uprising in 1991, and the internal Kurdish civil war in the mid-1990s, many museum's archives were lost. Therefore, information about many of the museum's acquisitions and artifacts are not available.

=== Halls ===
The museum's building is relatively small and is divided into 3 displaying halls:

- The first hall houses artifacts from the pre-historic periods to the beginning of the 2nd Millennium BC. Visitors will see artifacts from the Paleolithic age, Jarmo, Halaf, Samara, Ubaid, Uruk, Eridu, Early Dynastic, Akkadian, and Neo-Sumerian periods. Few items date back to the Old-Babylonian period.
- The second hall displays items from the Urartian, Hurrian, Assyrian (both Middle and Neo-Assyrian), Seleucid, and Hatra periods. There are no artifacts from the Neo-Babylonian period.
- The last hall contains artifacts from the Sassanid and Islamic periods (mostly Abbasid).

=== Opening hours ===
The museum is open from Monday to Thursday, 9;00 AM to 1:00 PM. It is closed on holidays. Entrance is free.

== Gallery ==
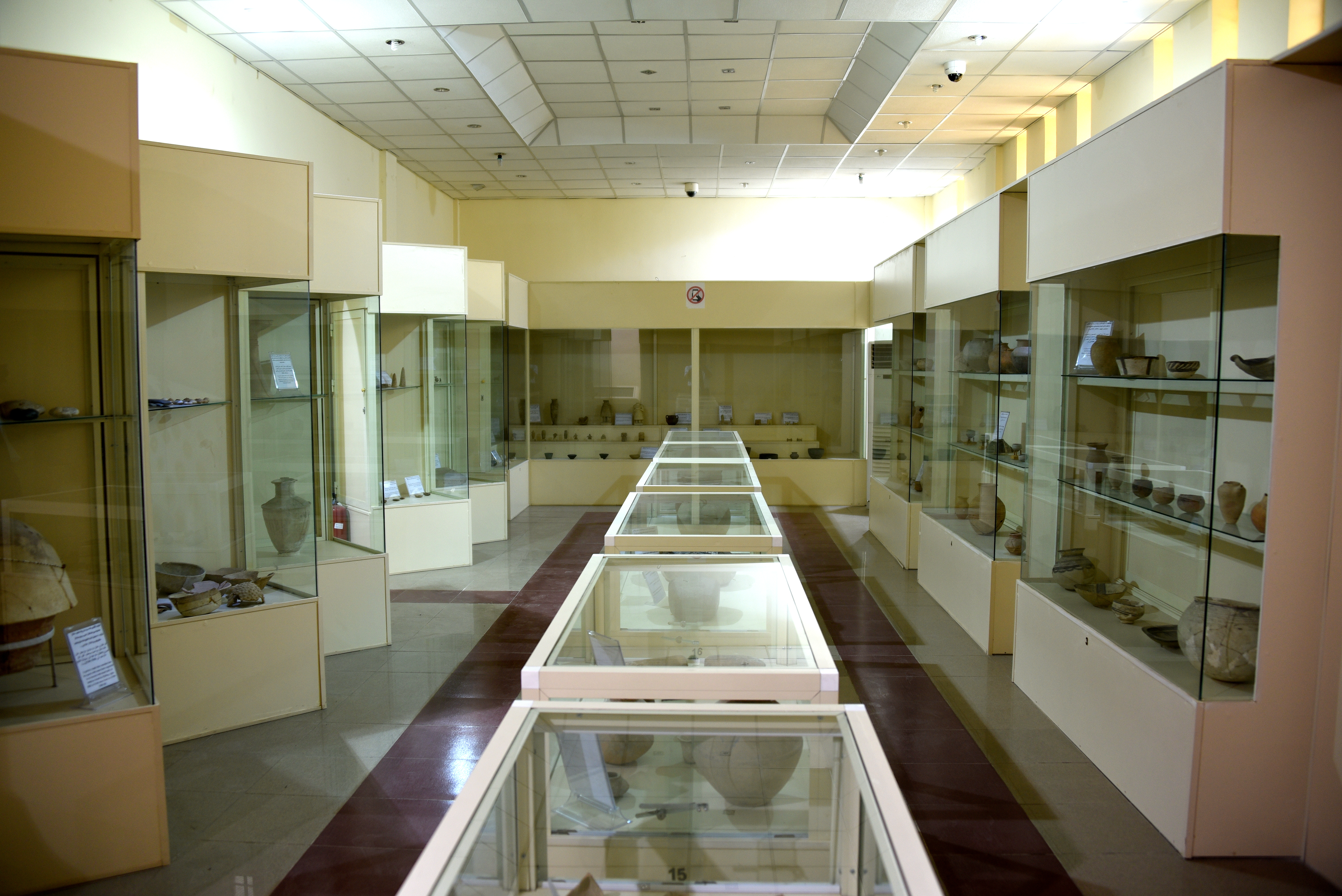
One of the halls of the Erbil Civilization Museum, displaying Mesopotamian artifacts from the Paleolithic period to the beginning of the 2nd Millennium BC

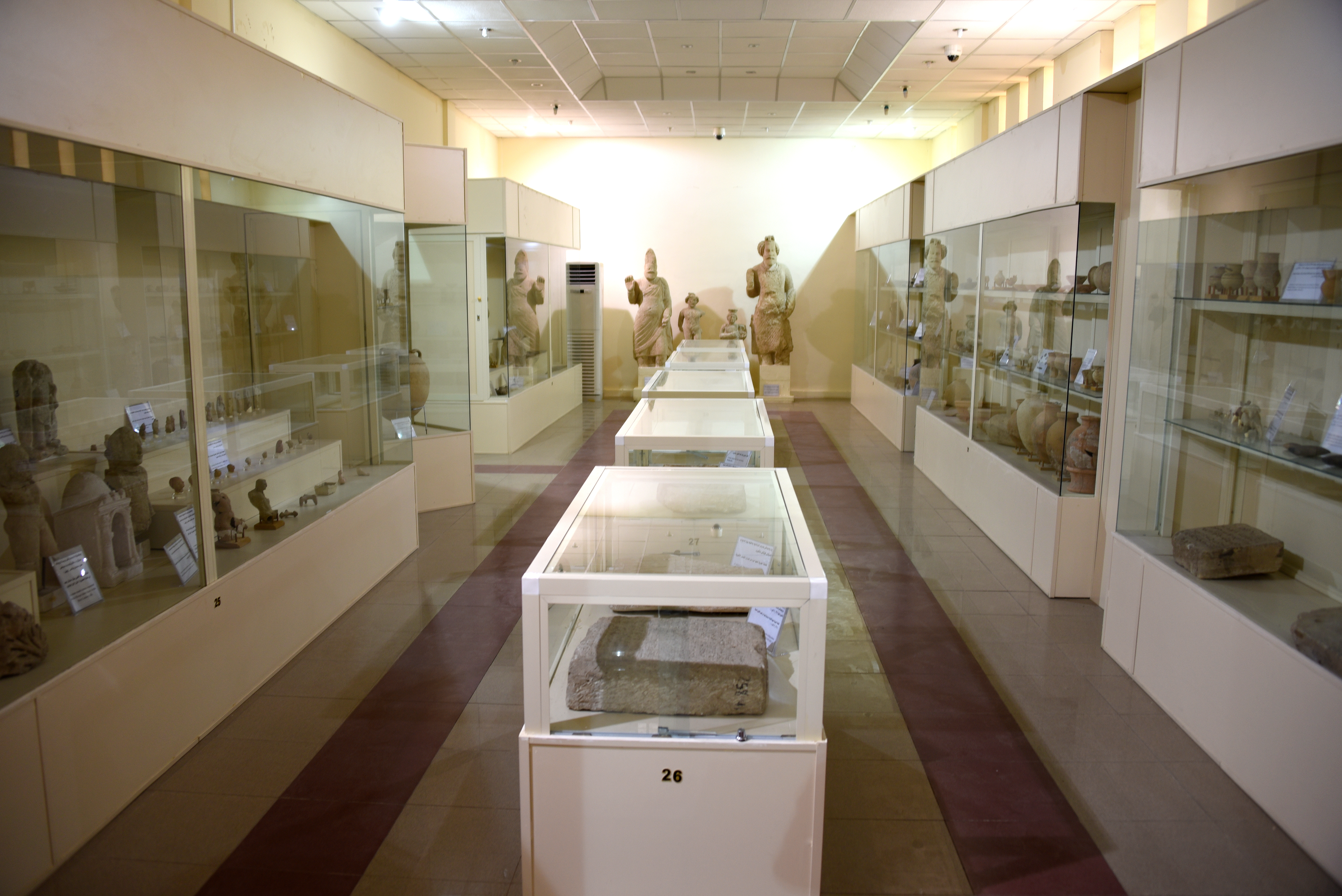
One of the halls of the Erbil Civilization Museum displaying artifacts from the Urartian, Hurrian, Assyrian, and Hatra periods. Iraqi Kurdistan.

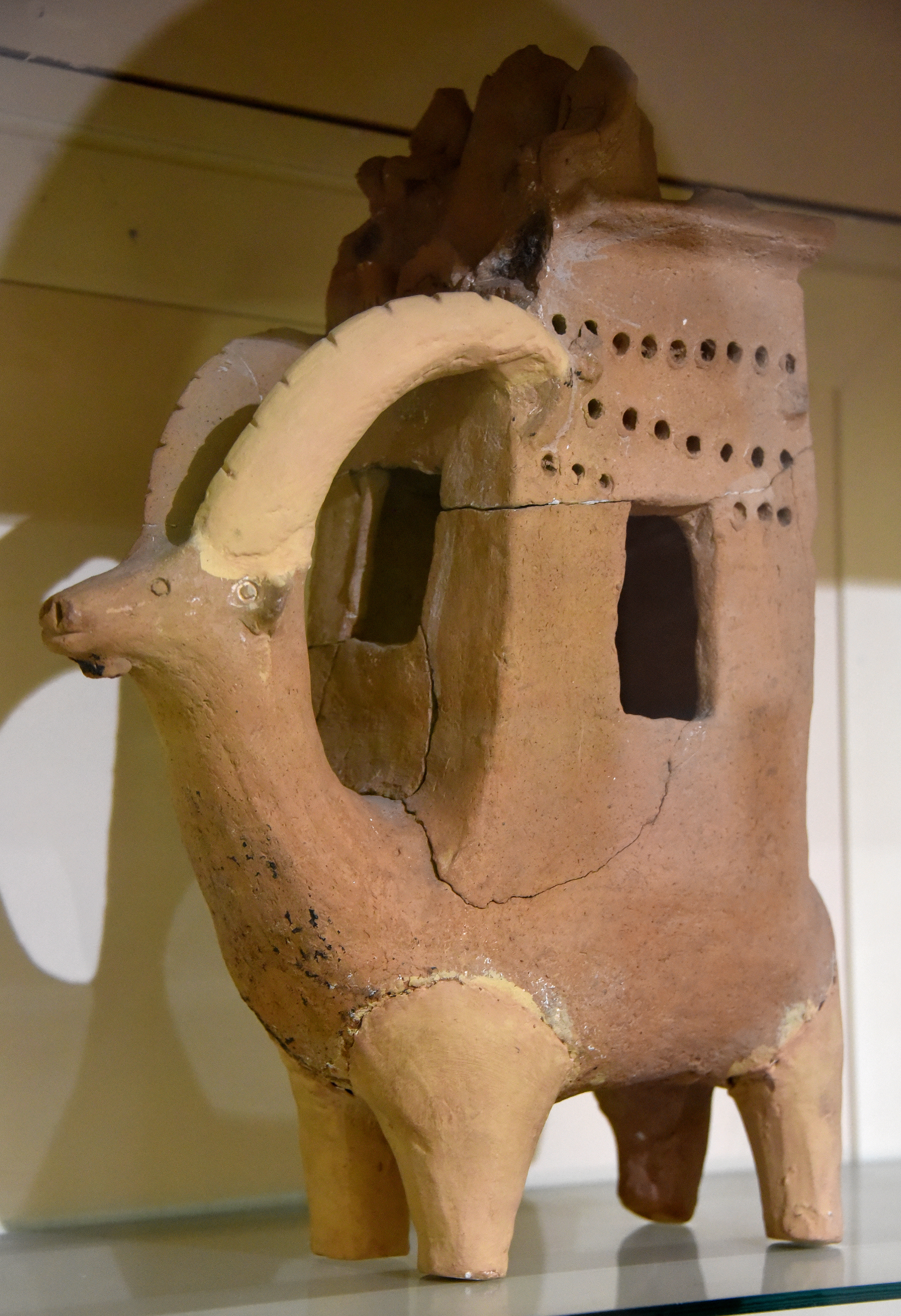
Incense burner. Hurrian period, 1300-1000 BC. From Tell Basmosian (also Tell Bazmusian), modern-day Lake Dukan, Iraq. Erbil Civilization Museum, Iraqi Kurdistan. A very similar (but not identical) incense burner from the same area and period is on display at the Sulaymaniyah Museum.

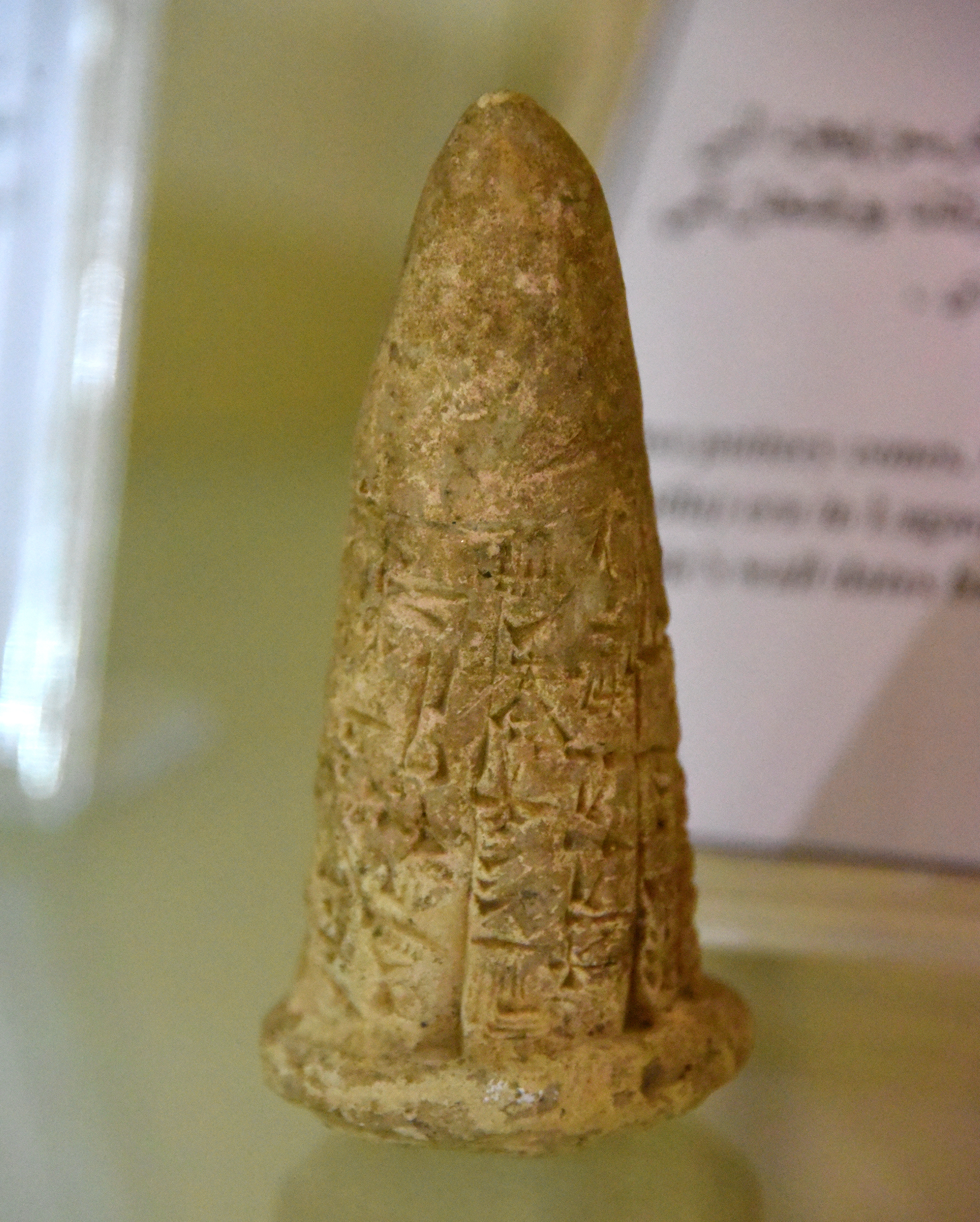
Temple foundation cone of Gudea, ruler of Lagash. 2144 – 2124 BC. From southern Mesopotamia, in modern-day Iraq. Erbil Civilization Museum, Iraqi Kurdistan.

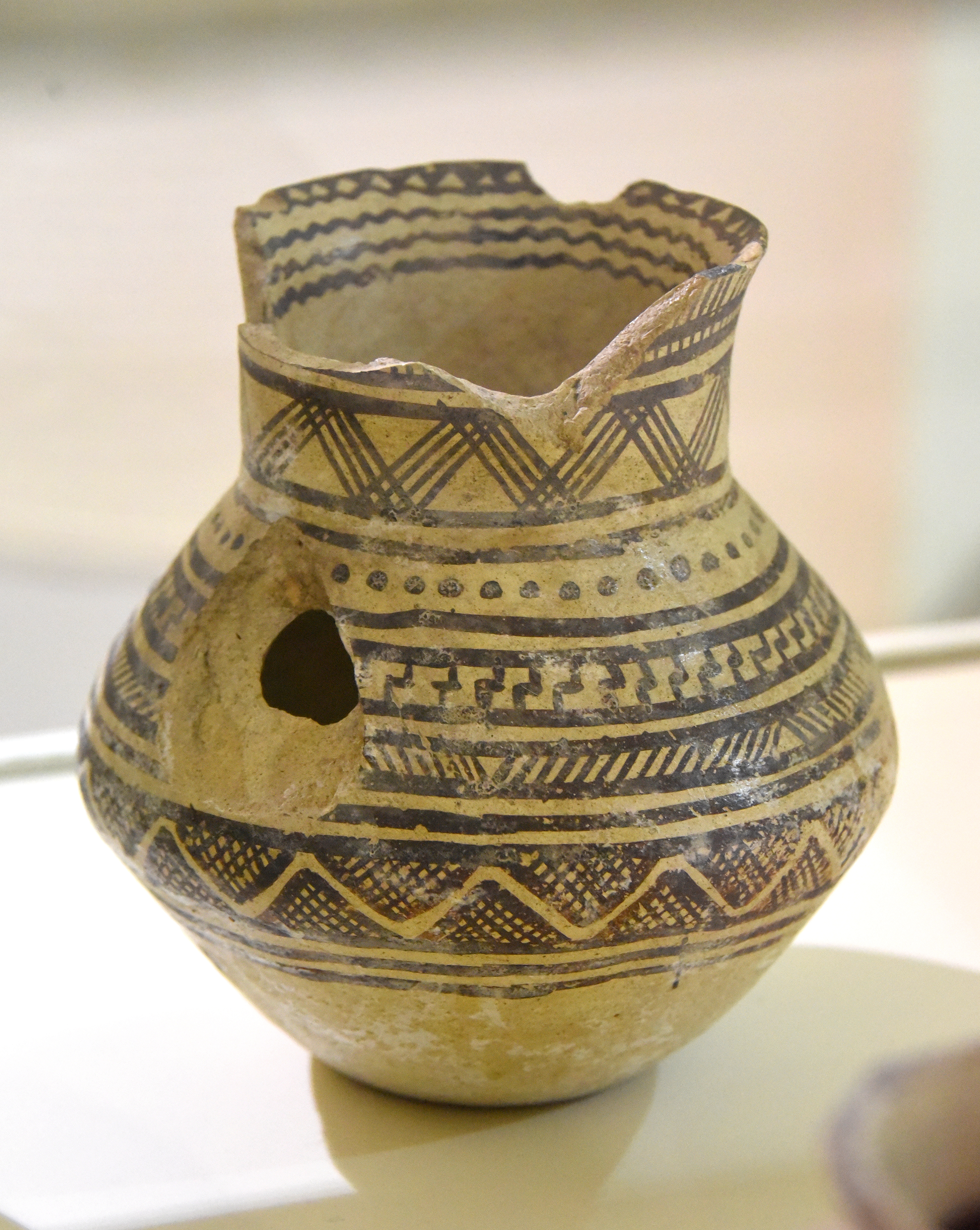
Pottery jar from Mesopotamia, modern-day Iraq. Halaf period, 4900-4300 BC. Erbil Civilization Museum, Iraqi Kurdistan.

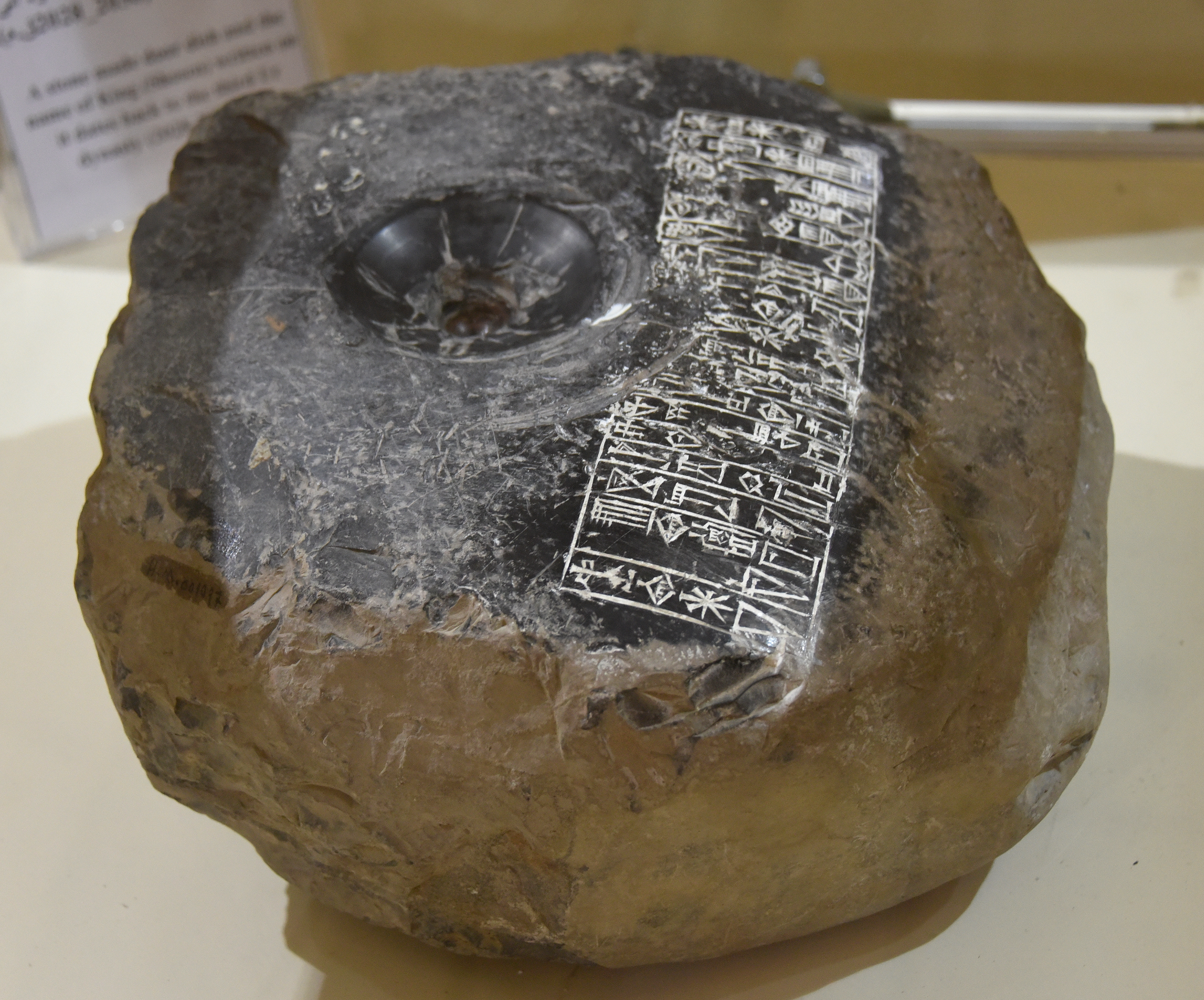
Door socket inscribed with the name of Shu-Sin, king of Ur, Ur III. From Mesopotamia, Erbil Civilization Museum

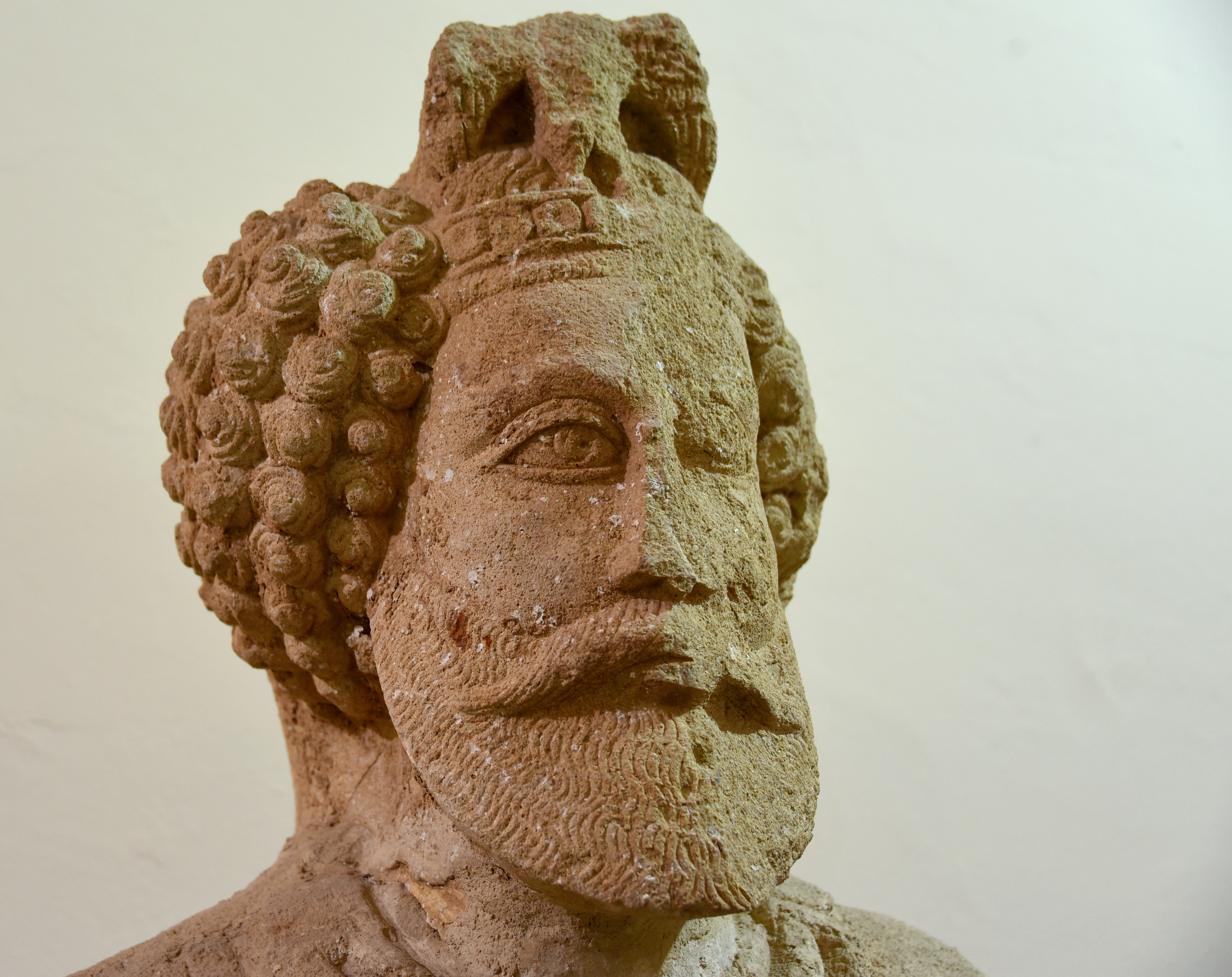
Sanatruq I, 2nd century AD. From Hatra. Erbil Civilization Museum, Iraqi Kurdistan

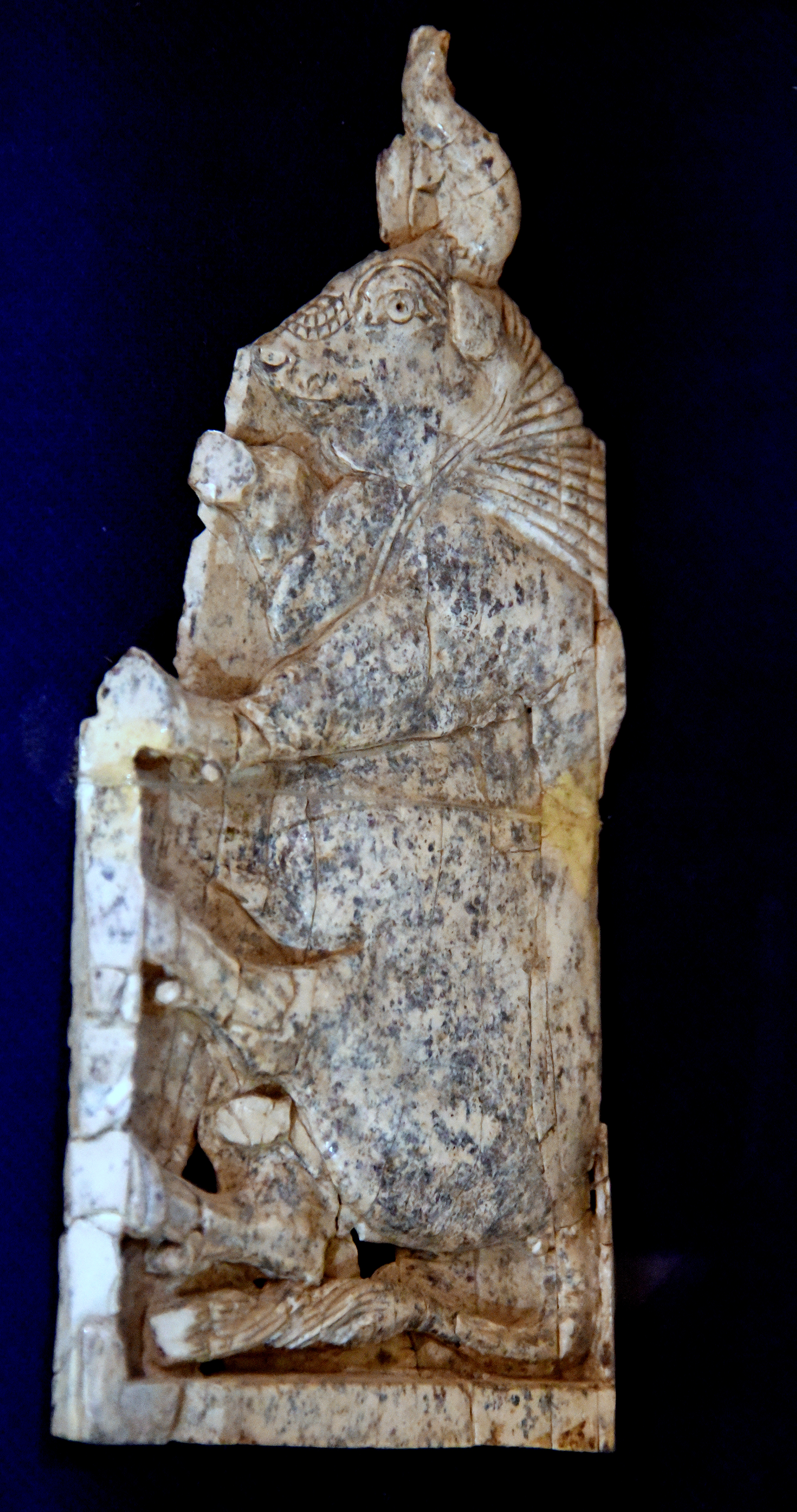
Ivory plaque from Nimrud. It depicts a standing and striding bull. From Nimrud, Mesopotamia, Iraq. Neo Assyrian Period, 911 to 612 BCE. Erbil Civilization Museum, Iraq

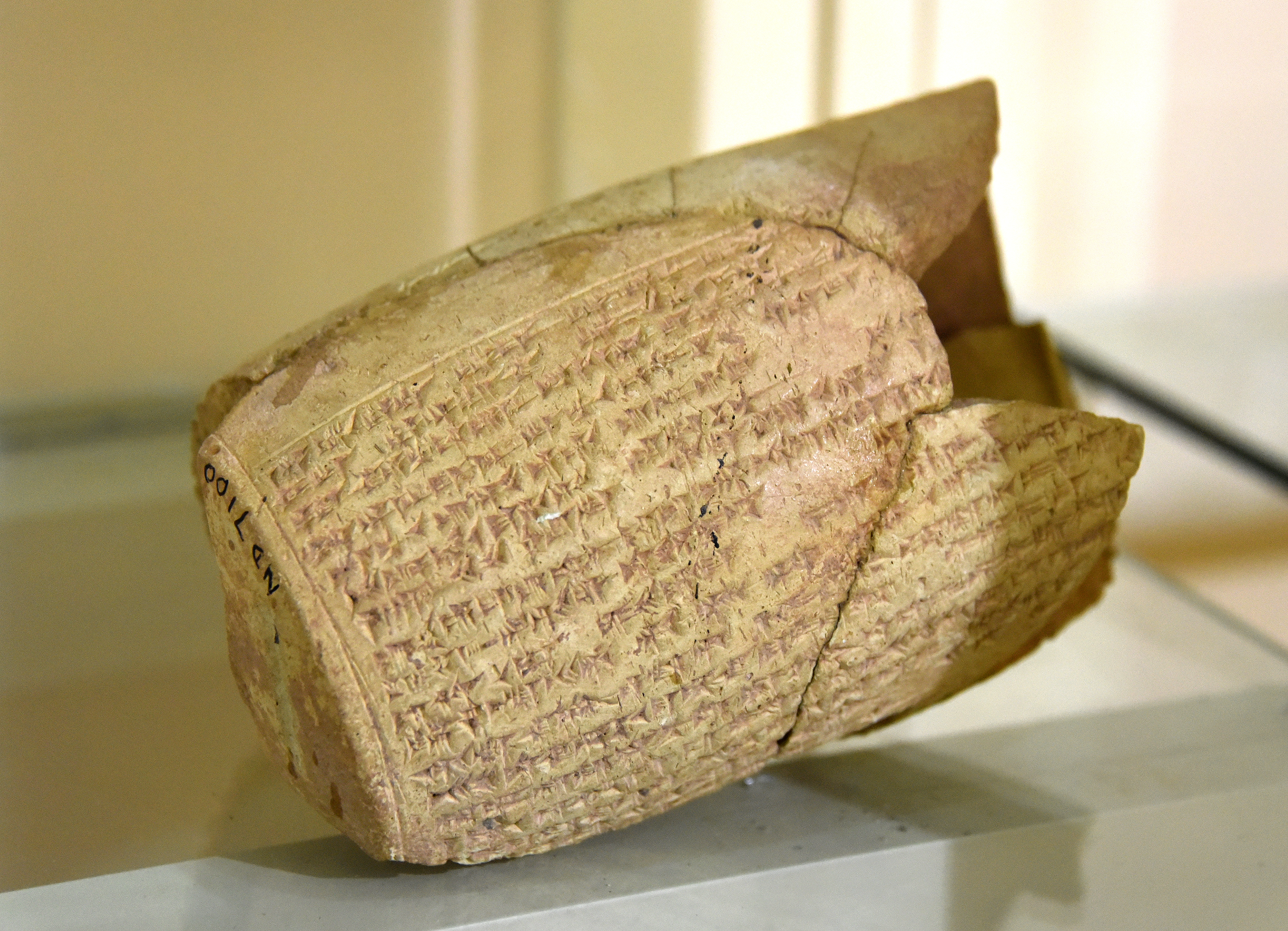
Easarhaddon cylinder from fort Shalmaneser at Nimrud. It was found in the city of Nimrud and was housed in the Iraqi Museum, Baghdad. Erbil Civilization Museum, Iraq

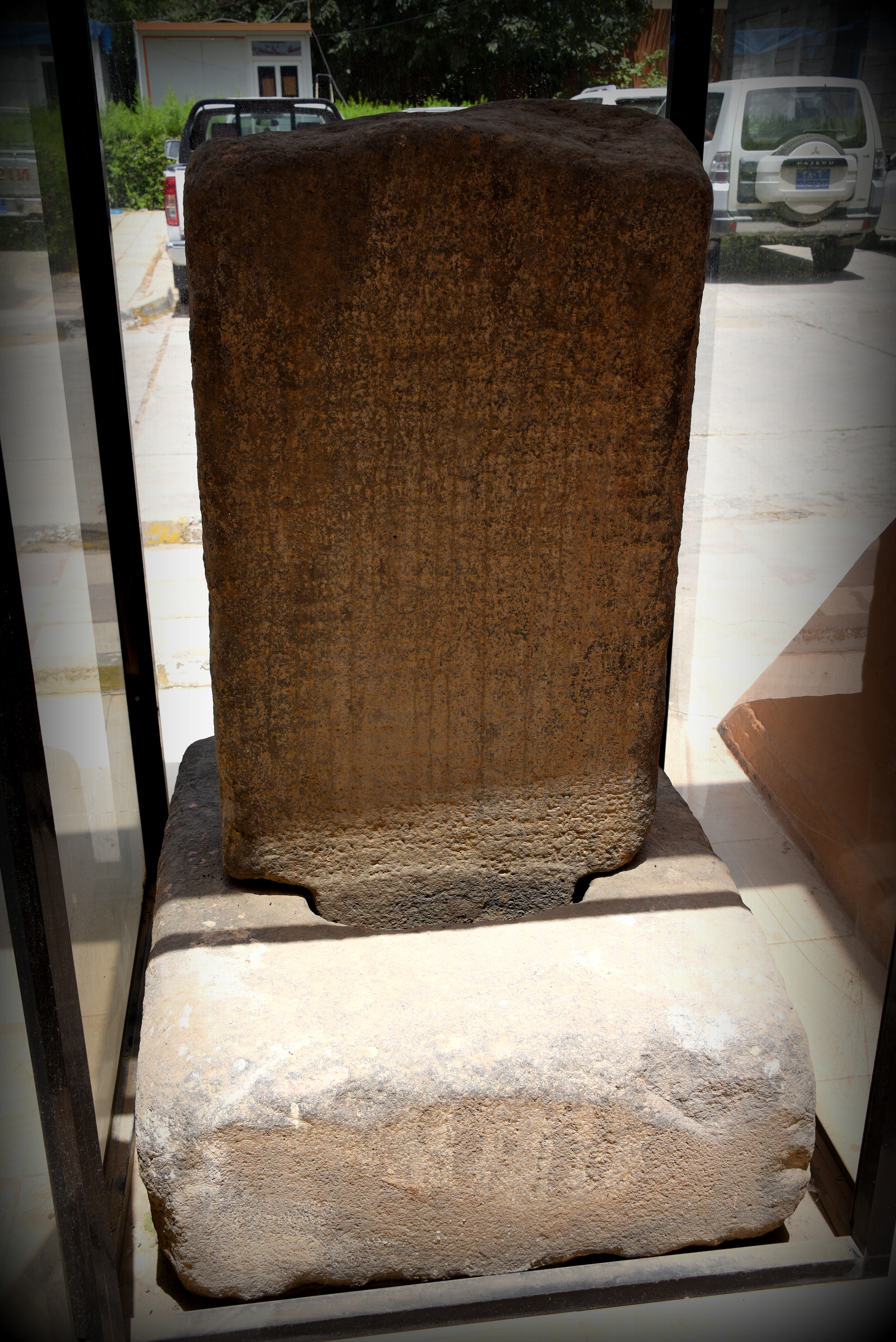
Topzawa Stele or Topzawa Rock. It describes Urartian clashes with Assyrians. The stele belonged to the kingdom of Musasir at Sidekan village, Erbil Governorate, Iraq. Erbil Civilization Museum, Iraqi Kurdistan

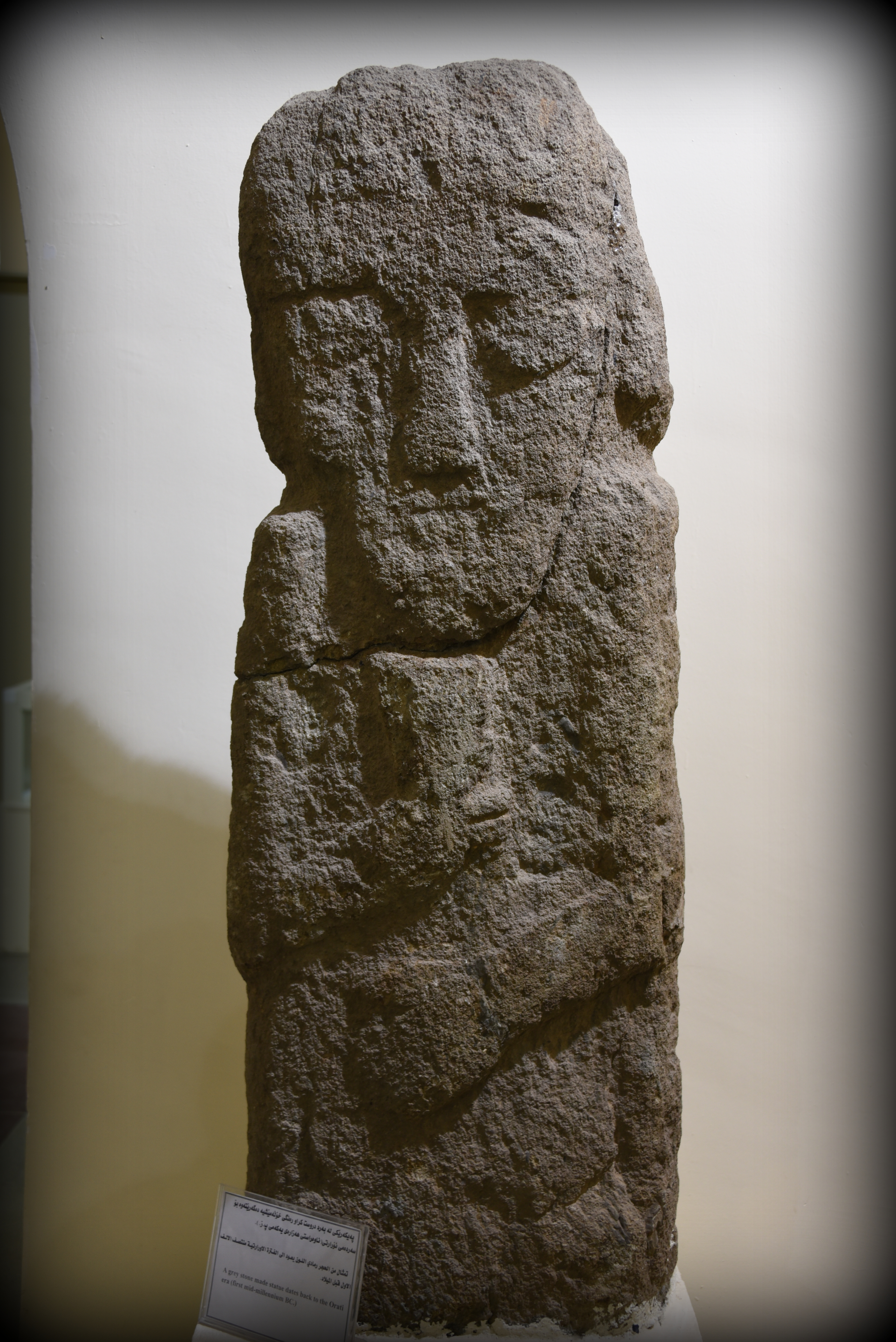
Sandstone statue of a man or deity. The statue belonged to the Musasir Kingdom. Urartian period, 1st millennium BCE. Precise provenance of excavation is unknown. Erbil Civilization Museum, Iraqi Kurdistan

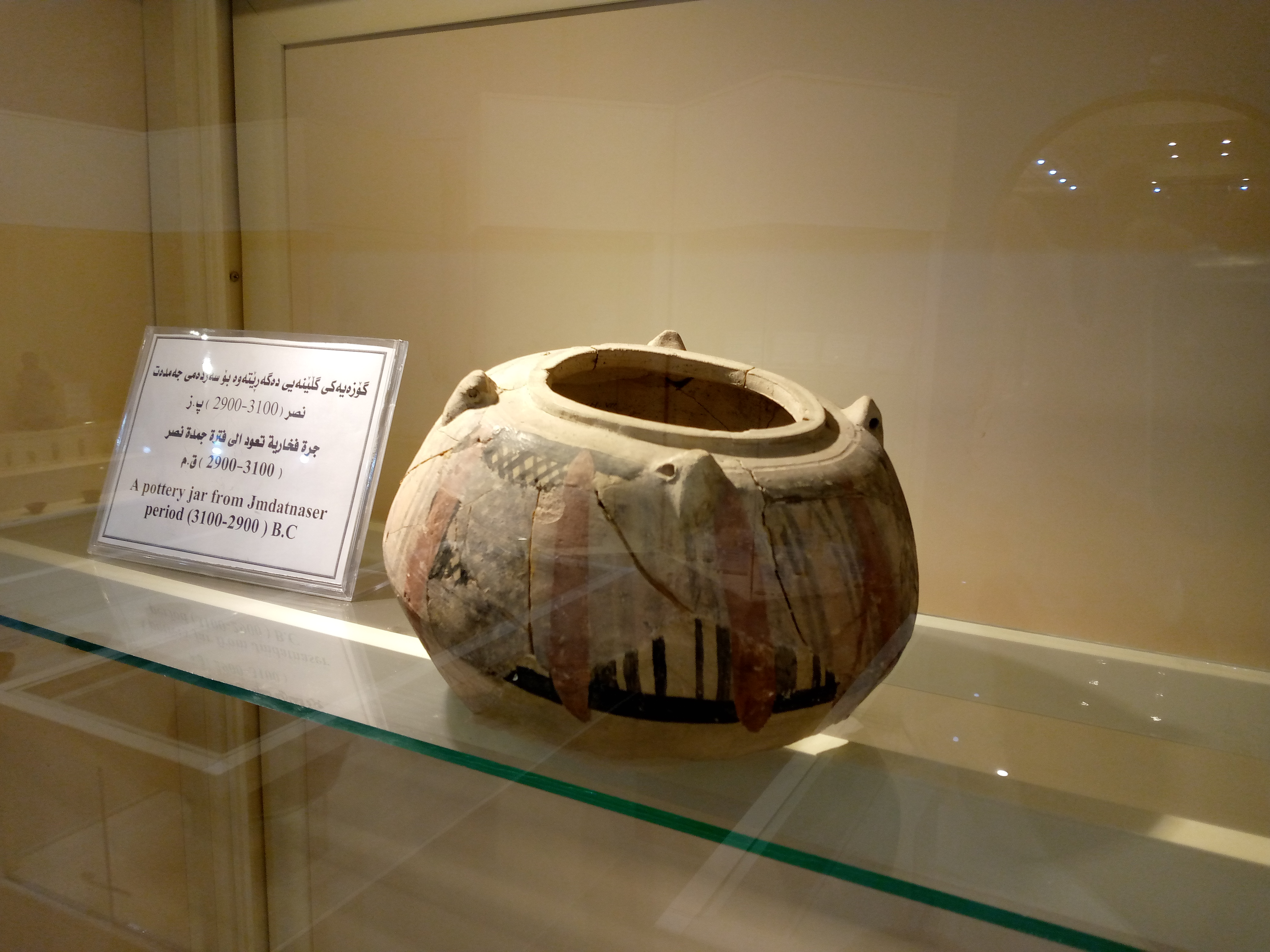
A Pottery jar from Jemdet Nasr period (3100-2900)B.C

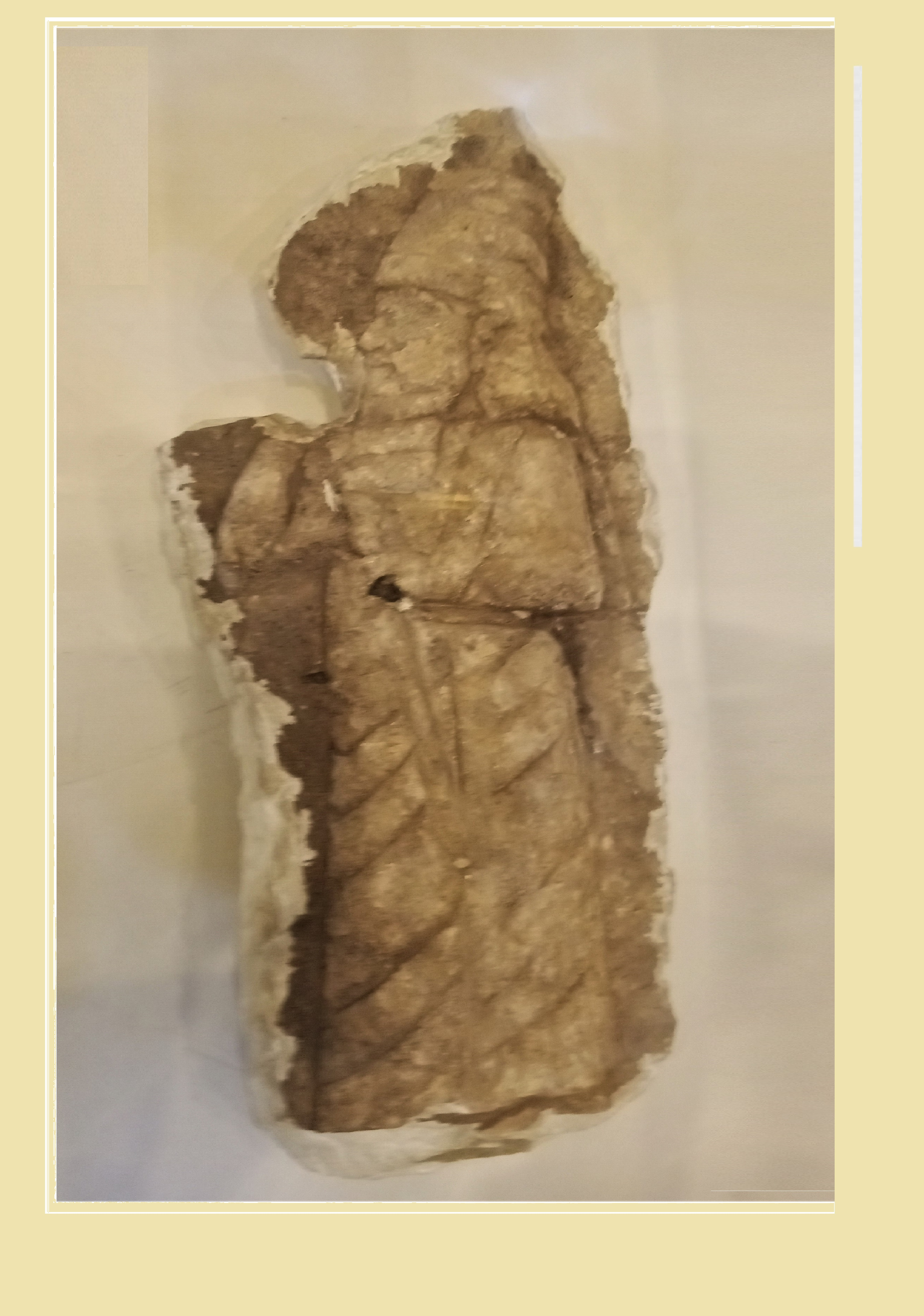
A Statue of the Neo - Assyrian King Sennacherib who ruled Assyria from 705-681 B.C

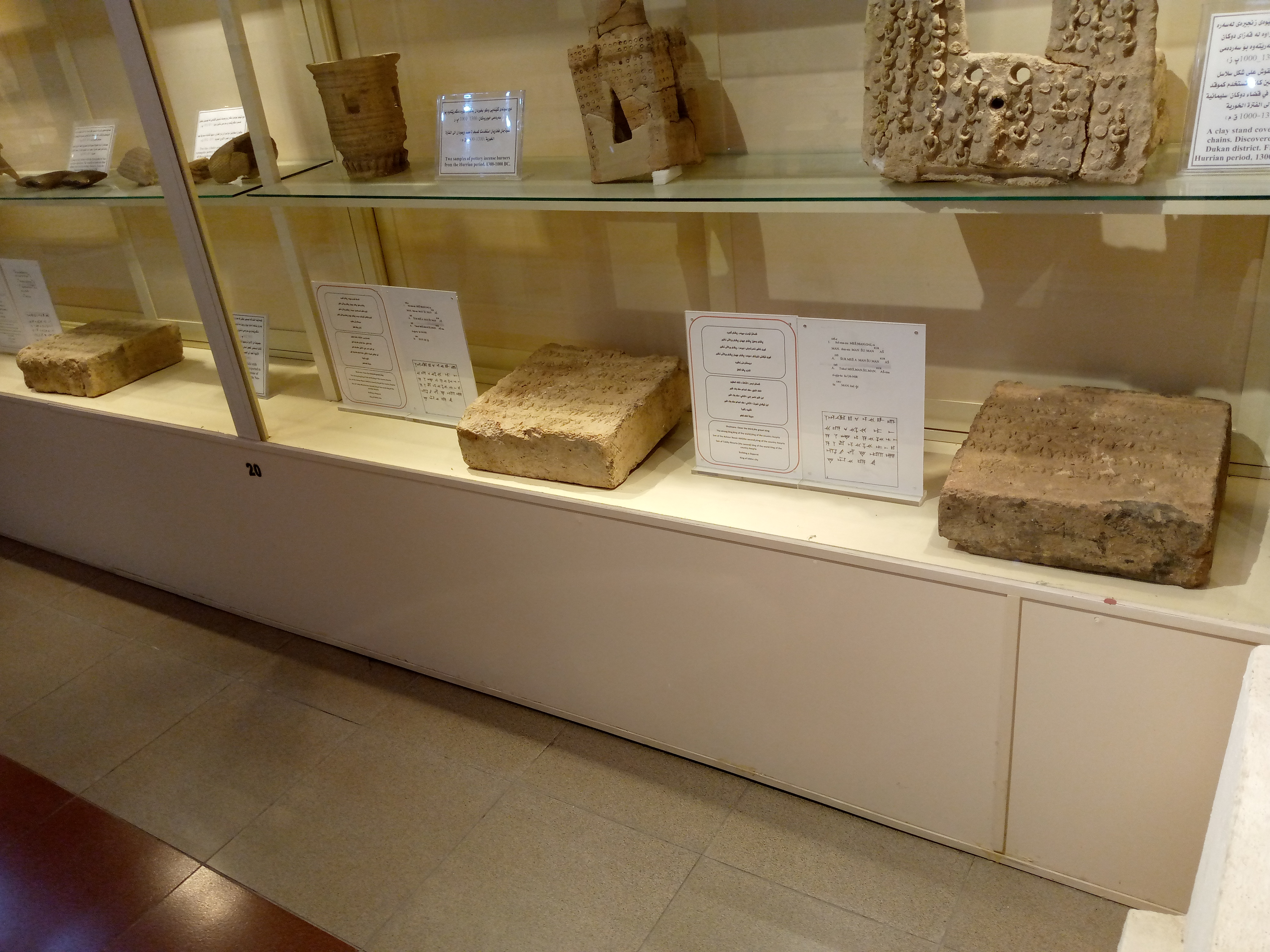
Cuneiform writings on the bricks of King Shalmaneser III

== See also ==
- List of museums in Iraq
