= 09 (film) =

2021 Kurdish action thriller film directed by Bakhtyar Fatah

- Sorani Kurdish: ٠٩
- Directed by: Bakhtyar Fatah
- Written by: Darko Jabar
- Produced by: Bakhtyar Fatah
- Starring: Mahir Hassan; Sirwan Jamal; Chrika Abarash; Besaran Jasim; Zhalla Rasul; Mohammed Wrya
- Cinematography: Zanyar Fatah; Saman Jalal
- Edited by: Miran Omar
- Music by: Karzan Mahmood
- Production company: KAM Production
- Release date: March 3, 2021 (City Cinema)
- Running time: 92 minutes
- Country: Kurdistan
- Language: Kurdish
- Budget: $450,000

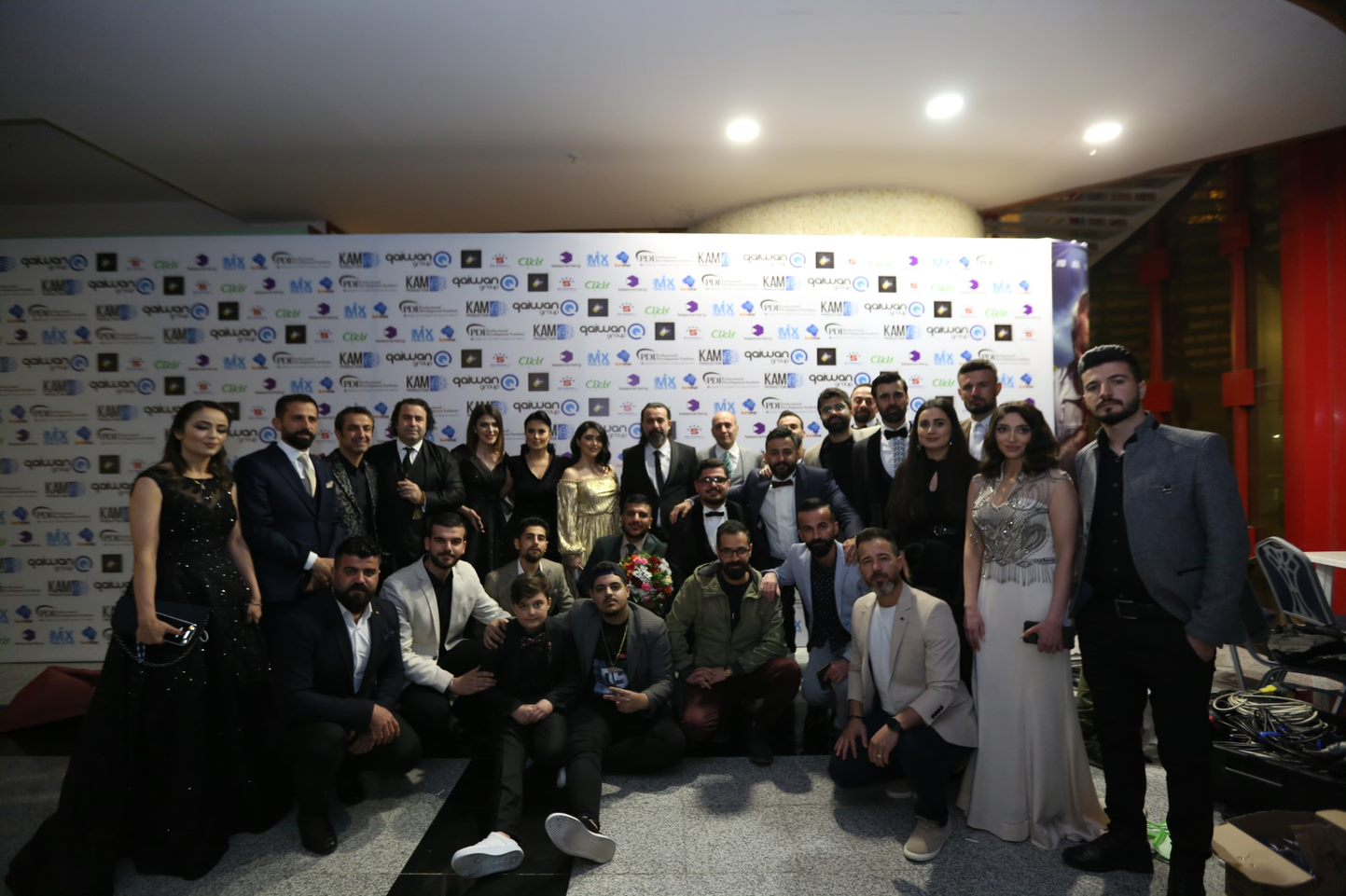
09 Cast during the premiere show in Sulaymaniyah

09 (Sorani Kurdish: ٠٩, romanized: Sifir No) is a 2021 Kurdish crime thriller film directed and produced by Bakhtyar Fatah in his feature directorial debut. It stars Shwan Attoof, Mahir Hassan, Sirwan Jamal, Chrika Abarash, Besaran Jasim, Zhalla Rasul And Mohammed Wrya. Promoted as "the first Kurdish crime mystery film", the film is about a detective facing an organ trafficking band who has blackmailed a doctor for the organs.

09 had its premiere on March 3, 2021 in Talari Hunar, Slemani. It was theatrically released on March 4, 2021.

== Premise ==
A detective who had abandoned his daughter for a governmental mission risks his life in order to fix their relationship. Their search leads them to face an organ trafficking band who has blackmailed a doctor for harvesting the organs.

== Release ==
The release of the film was delayed due to COVID-19 pandemic in Kurdistan. The film premiered on March 4, 2021 in Talari Hunar, Slemani. The Ministry of Interior of Kurdistan released an announcement of closing the film theaters due to COVID-19 pandemic. Soran Naqishbandy, the distributor of the film, said that the film got permission to release on March 4, 2021 in Sulaymaniyah, Kirkuk, and Garmiyan and will be released on March 10, 2021 in Erbil and Duhok.

== Cast ==
- Shwan Attoof as Alan
- Mahir Hassan as Michael
- Sirwan Jamal as Jan
- Chrika Abarash as Sara
- Besaran Jasm
- Zhalla Rasul
- Mohammed Wrya
