= Sulaymaniyah District =

Slemani District قەزای سلێمانی Arabic: قضاء السليمانية
- District
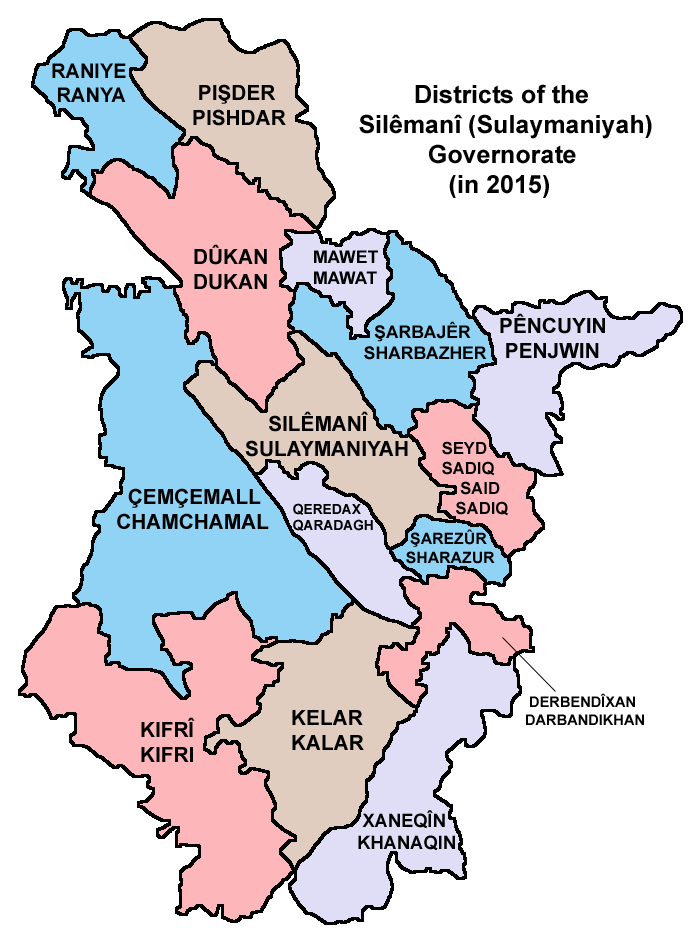
- Districts of the Sulaymaniyah Governorate
- Country: Iraq
- Autonomous region: Kurdistan
- Governorate: Sulaymaniyah Governorate
- Time zone: UTC+3 (AST)

Slemani District (Arabic: قضاء السليمانية; Sorani Kurdish: قەزای سلێمانی, romanized: Qezay Silêmanî) is a district of Sulaymaniyah Governorate, in the Kurdistan Region, Iraq. Its main city is Sulaymaniyah, the capital of the Governorate.
