= Roger Matthews (archaeologist) =

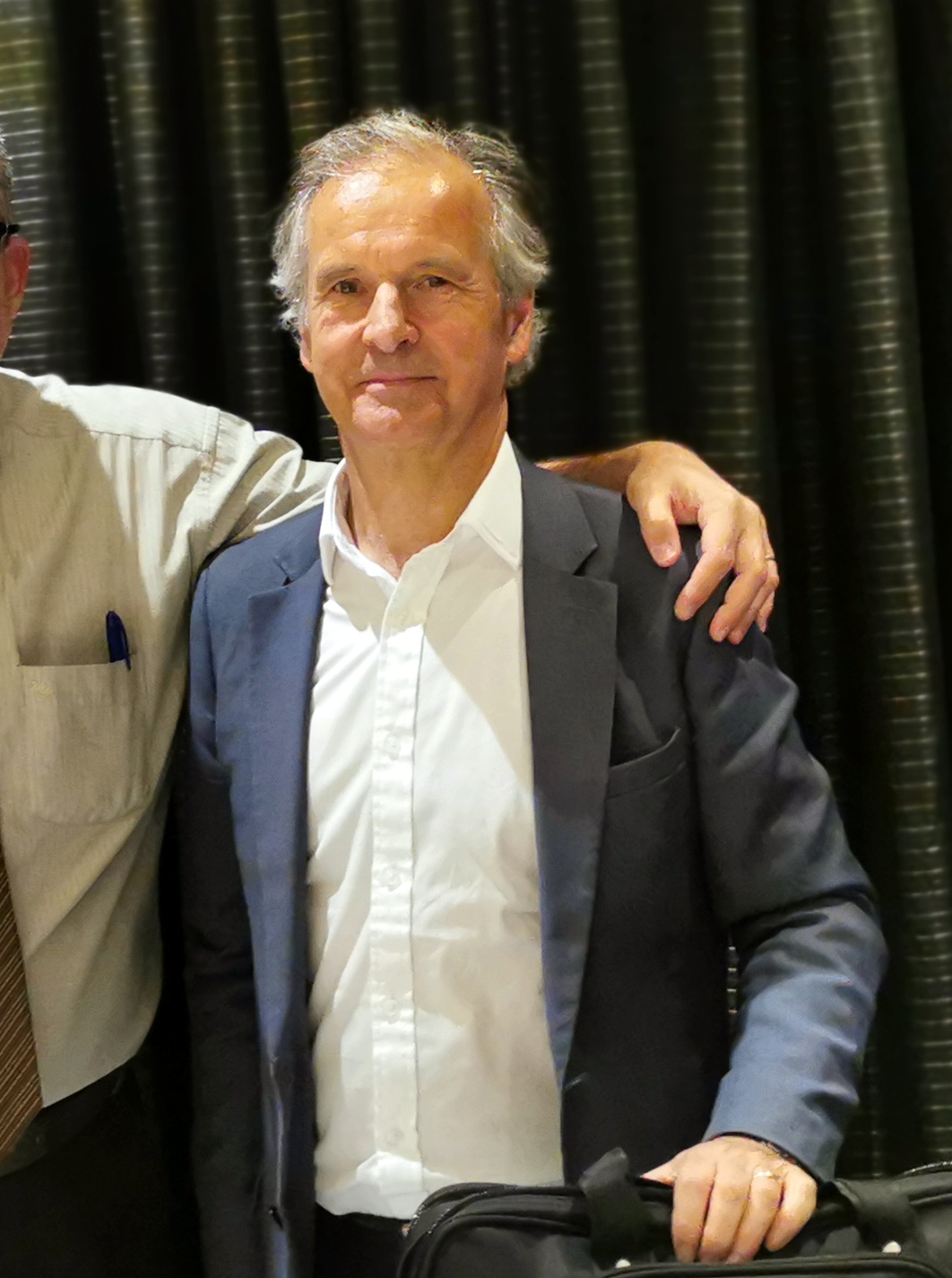
Professor Roger Matthews in October 2019, a workshop in Sulaymaniyah, Iraq

Professor Roger Matthews (born 21 August 1954) is head of department in the department of archaeology at the University of Reading. Matthews was previously with the UCL Institute of Archaeology. From 1988 to 1995, Matthews was director of the British School of Archaeology in Iraq, and from 1996 to 2001 he was director of the British Institute of Archaeology at Ankara.

Matthews is editor of the journal Anatolian Studies.
