= Wendy Matthews (archaeologist) =

British archaeologist

Wendy Matthews FSA
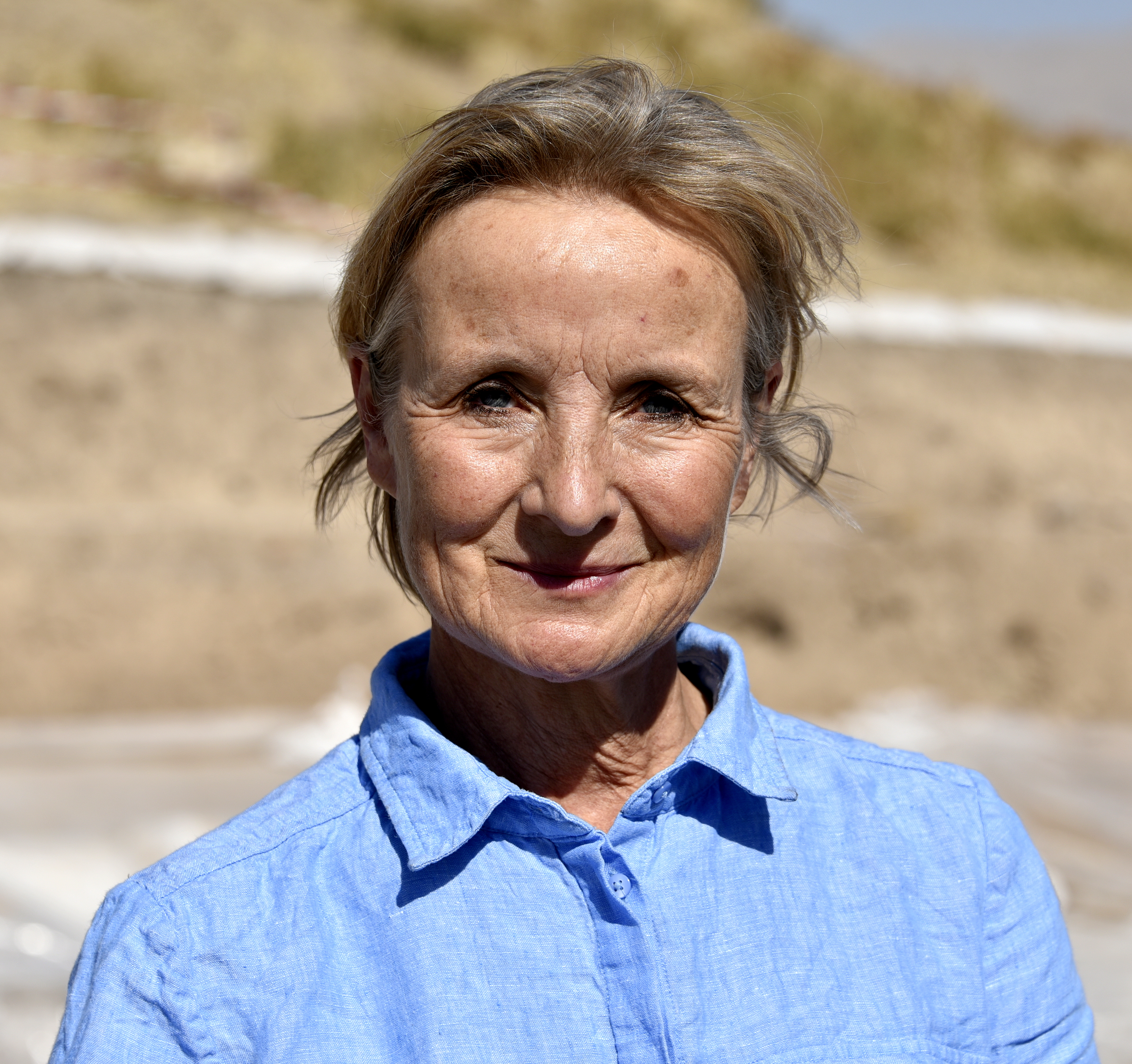
- At the Neolithic site of Bestansur, Iraq, October 11, 2021
- Occupations: Archaeologist; Academic

Academic background
- Education: Cambridge University University of Edinburgh
- Thesis: The micromorphology of occupational sequences and the use of space in a Sumerian city (1992)
- Doctoral advisor: Nicholas Postgate

Academic work
- Discipline: Archaeology
- Institutions: University of Reading

Wendy Matthews FSA is a British archaeologist and academic, specialising in Neolithic and Bronze Age Near Eastern archaeology and Geoarchaeology. She is an associate professor at the University of Reading since October 2000.

== Education ==
Matthews received a MA at the University of Edinburgh, then completed her doctoral thesis, The micromorphology of occupational sequences and the use of space in a Sumerian city at Cambridge University in 1992.

== Career and research ==
Following her PhD she held a postdoctoral research position at Cambridge and the British Institute in Ankara. Matthews' research has been key in the development of archaeological sediment micromorphology, particularly applied to buildings and occupation sequences, and she is known for her work at the Çatalhöyük UNESCO World Heritage Site in Turkey. Matthews is a co-director of the Central Zagros Archaeological Project. She was elected as a fellow of the Society of Antiquaries of London on 10 October 2019.

== Select publications ==
- Garcia-Suarez, A., Portillo, M. and Matthews, W. (2020) "Early animal management strategies during the Neolithic of the Konya Plain, Central Anatolia: integrating micromorphological and microfossil evidence". Environmental Archaeology: the Journal of Human Palaeoecology 25(2). 208–226. doi:10.1080/14614103.2018.1497831
- Matthews, W. (2018) "Creating settled life: Micro-histories of community, ritual and place - the Central Zagros and Çatalhöyük". In: Hodder, I. (ed.) Religion History and Place: The Origins of Settled Life. University of Colorado, Denver.
- Matthews, W. (2016) "Humans and fire: changing relations in early agricultural and built environments in the Zagros, Iran, Iraq". The Anthropocene Review, 3(2). 107–139.doi:10.1177/2053019616636134
- Matthews, W. (2012) "Defining households: micro-contextual analysis of early Neolithic households in the Zagros, Iran". In: Parker, B. J. and Foster, C. P. (eds.) Household archaeology: new perspectives from the Near East and beyond. Eisenbrauns, Winona Lake. 183–216.
- Matthews, W. (2010) "Geoarchaeology and taphonomy of plant remains in early urban environments in the Ancient Near East". Quaternary International, 214 (1-2). 98–113. doi:10.1016/j.quaint.2009.10.019
