= Cuneiform Numbers and Punctuation =

- Range: U+12400..U+1247F (128 code points)
- Plane: SMP
- Scripts: Cuneiform
- Symbol sets: Numeric signs Fractions; Punctuation
- Assigned: 128 code points
- Unused: 0 reserved code points

Unicode Version History
- 5.0 (2006): 103 (+103)
- 7.0 (2014): 116 (+13)
- 18.0 (2026): 128 (+12)

Unicode documentation
- Code chart ∣ Web page

In Unicode, the Sumero-Akkadian Cuneiform script is covered in the following blocks in the Supplementary Multilingual Plane (SMP):

- U+12000–U+123FF Cuneiform
- U+12400–U+1247F Cuneiform Numbers and Punctuation
- U+12480–U+1254F Early Dynastic Cuneiform
- U+12550–U+1268F Archaic Cuneiform Numerals

The sample glyphs in the chart file published by the Unicode Consortium show the characters in their Classical Sumerian form (Early Dynastic period, mid 3rd millennium BCE). The characters as written during the 2nd and 1st millennia BCE, the era during which the vast majority of cuneiform texts were written, are considered font variants of the same characters.

== Organization ==
The final proposal for Unicode encoding of the script was submitted by two cuneiform scholars working with an experienced Unicode proposal writer in June 2004. The base character inventory is derived from the list of Ur III signs compiled by the Cuneiform Digital Library Initiative of UCLA based on the inventories of Miguel Civil, Rykle Borger (2003), and Robert Englund. Rather than opting for a direct ordering by glyph shape and complexity, according to the numbering of an existing catalogue, the Unicode order of glyphs was based on the Latin alphabetic order of their 'main' Sumerian transliteration as a practical approximation.

== Block ==
Cuneiform Numbers and Punctuation^{[1]} Official Unicode Consortium code chart (PDF)
	0	1	2	3	4	5	6	7	8	9	A	B	C	D	E	F
U+1240x	𒐀	𒐁	𒐂	𒐃	𒐄	𒐅	𒐆	𒐇	𒐈	𒐉	𒐊	𒐋	𒐌	𒐍	𒐎	𒐏
U+1241x	𒐐	𒐑	𒐒	𒐓	𒐔	𒐕	𒐖	𒐗	𒐘	𒐙	𒐚	𒐛	𒐜	𒐝	𒐞	𒐟
U+1242x	𒐠	𒐡	𒐢	𒐣	𒐤	𒐥	𒐦	𒐧	𒐨	𒐩	𒐪	𒐫	𒐬	𒐭	𒐮	𒐯
U+1243x	𒐰	𒐱	𒐲	𒐳	𒐴	𒐵	𒐶	𒐷	𒐸	𒐹	𒐺	𒐻	𒐼	𒐽	𒐾	𒐿
U+1244x	𒑀	𒑁	𒑂	𒑃	𒑄	𒑅	𒑆	𒑇	𒑈	𒑉	𒑊	𒑋	𒑌	𒑍	𒑎	𒑏
U+1245x	𒑐	𒑑	𒑒	𒑓	𒑔	𒑕	𒑖	𒑗	𒑘	𒑙	𒑚	𒑛	𒑜	𒑝	𒑞	𒑟
U+1246x	𒑠	𒑡	𒑢	𒑣	𒑤	𒑥	𒑦	𒑧	𒑨	𒑩	𒑪	𒑫	𒑬	𒑭	𒑮	𒑯
U+1247x	𒑰	𒑱	𒑲	𒑳	𒑴	𒑵	𒑶	𒑷	𒑸	𒑹	𒑺	𒑻	𒑼	𒑽	𒑾	𒑿
Notes 1.As of Unicode version 18.0

== Signs ==
The following table allows matching of Borger's 1981 and 2003 numbering with Unicode characters The "primary" transliteration column has the glyphs' Sumerian values as given by the official glyph name, slightly modified here for legibility by including traditional assyriological symbols such as "x" rather than "TIMES". The exact Unicode names can be unambiguously recovered by prefixing, "CUNEIFORM [NUMERIC] SIGN", replacing "TIMES" for "x", "PLUS" for "+" and "OVER" for "/", "ASTERISK" for "*", "H" for "Ḫ", "SH" for "Š", and switching to uppercase.

Sign	Code point	Name	Borger (2003)	Borger (1981)	Comments
𒀸	U+12038	one AŠ	001		1, from general Cuneiform_(Unicode_block) not this block
𒐀	U+12400	two AŠ	002	2	2, = U+1212C
𒐁	U+12401	three AŠ	004		3, EŠ_{6}
𒐂	U+12402	four AŠ	215	124,42	4, LIMMU_{2}, LIMM_{2}, TAB.TAB
𒐃	U+12403	five AŠ	216		5, IA_{7}, TAB.TAB.AŠ
𒐄	U+12404	six AŠ	217		6, AŠ_{4}, TAB.TAB.TAB
𒐅	U+12405	seven AŠ	218		7, IMIN_{2}, TAB.TAB.TAB.AŠ
𒐆	U+12406	eight AŠ	219		8, USSU_{2}, TAB.TAB.TAB.TAB
𒐇	U+12407	nine AŠ	220		9, ILIMMU_{2}, TAB.TAB.TAB.TAB.AŠ
𒐈	U+12408	three DIŠ	834	593	3, 180, EŠ_{5}
𒐉	U+12409	four DIŠ	851; 852; 853	316	4, 240, ZA, LIMMU_{5}, NIGIDALIMMU, = U+1235D
𒐊	U+1240A	five DIŠ	861	598a	5, 300, IA_{2}
𒐋	U+1240B	six DIŠ	862	598b	6, 360, AŠ_{3}
𒐌	U+1240C	seven DIŠ	863	598c	7, 420
𒐍	U+1240D	eight DIŠ	864	598d	8, 480
𒐎	U+1240E	nine DIŠ			9, 540
𒐏	U+1240F	four U	713	474	40, NIMIN
𒐐	U+12410	five U	714	475	50, NINNU
𒐑	U+12411	six U	715	476	60
𒐒	U+12412	seven U	716	477	70
𒐓	U+12413	eight U	717	478	80
𒐔	U+12414	nine U	718	479	90
𒐕	U+12415	one GEŠ_{2}			
𒐖	U+12416	two GEŠ_{2}			
𒐗	U+12417	three GEŠ_{2}			
𒐘	U+12418	four GEŠ_{2}			
𒐙	U+12419	five GEŠ_{2}			
𒐚	U+1241A	six GEŠ_{2}			
𒐛	U+1241B	seven GEŠ_{2}			
𒐜	U+1241C	eight GEŠ_{2}			
𒐝	U+1241D	nine GEŠ_{2}			
𒐞	U+1241E	one GEŠU	824	534	GEŠ_{2}.U; 600 or 70
𒐟	U+1241F	two GEŠU			1200 or 80
𒐠	U+12420	three GEŠU			1800 or 90
𒐡	U+12421	four GEŠU			2400 or 100
𒐢	U+12422	five GEŠU			3000 or 110
𒐣	U+12423	two ŠAR_{2}			
𒐤	U+12424	three ŠAR_{2}			
𒐥	U+12425	three ŠAR_{2} variant form			
𒐦	U+12426	four ŠAR_{2}			
𒐧	U+12427	five ŠAR_{2}			
𒐨	U+12428	six ŠAR_{2}			
𒐩	U+12429	seven ŠAR_{2}			
𒐪	U+1242A	eight ŠAR_{2}			
𒐫	U+1242B	nine ŠAR_{2}			
𒐬	U+1242C	one ŠARU	653	409	36,000
𒐭	U+1242D	two ŠARU			72,000
𒐮	U+1242E	three ŠARU			108,000
𒐯	U+1242F	three ŠARU variant form			108,000
𒐰	U+12430	four ŠARU			144,000
𒐱	U+12431	five ŠARU			180,000
𒐲	U+12432	ŠAR_{2} x GAL.DIŠ	651	408	216,000
𒐳	U+12433	ŠAR_{2} x GAL.MIN	652	408	432,000
𒐴	U+12434	one BURU	662	350,8	U gunû
𒐵	U+12435	two BURU			
𒐶	U+12436	three BURU			
𒐷	U+12437	three BURU variant form			
𒐸	U+12438	four BURU			
𒐹	U+12439	five BURU			
𒐺	U+1243A	EŠ_{16}	505		3, = U+1203C
𒐻	U+1243B	EŠ_{21}	210		3
𒐼	U+1243C	LIMMU	859; 860		4, NIG_{2}, GAR, NINDA
𒐽	U+1243D	LIMMU_{4}	506		4
𒐾	U+1243E				
𒐿	U+1243F				
𒑀	U+12440	AŠ_{9}	536		6, EŠ_{16}.EŠ_{16}
𒑁	U+12441	IMIN_{3}	537		7, UMUN_{9}
𒑂	U+12442	IMIN	863		7
𒑃	U+12443	IMIN variant form	866		7
𒑄	U+12444	USSU	867		8
𒑅	U+12445	USSU_{3}	538		8
𒑆	U+12446	ILIMMU	868		9
𒑇	U+12447	ILIMMU_{3}	539		9, EŠ_{16}.EŠ_{16}.EŠ_{16}
𒑈	U+12448	ILIMMU_{4}	577		9
𒑉	U+12449	DIŠ / DIŠ / DIŠ	865v		9
𒑊	U+1244A	two AŠ tenû	593		
𒑋	U+1244B	three AŠ tenû	629		
𒑌	U+1244C	four AŠ tenû	854	379; 380	ZA tenû, ERIM tenû
𒑍	U+1244D	five AŠ tenû			
𒑎	U+1244E	six AŠ tenû			
𒑏	U+1244F	one BAN_{2}	122		= U+12047
𒑐	U+12450	two BAN_{2}			
𒑑	U+12451	three BAN_{2}			
𒑒	U+12452	four BAN_{2}			
𒑓	U+12453	four BAN_{2} variant form			
𒑔	U+12454	five BAN_{2}			
𒑕	U+12455	five BAN_{2} variant form			
𒑖	U+12456	NIGIDAMIN	847, 848		
𒑗	U+12457	NIGIDAEŠ	850		
𒑘	U+12458	one EŠE_{3}			= U+12041, U+12300
𒑙	U+12459	two EŠE_{3}			= U+12049
𒑚	U+1245A	one third	826	571	ŠUŠANA
𒑛	U+1245B	two thirds	832	572	
𒑜	U+1245C	five sixths	838	573	KINGUSILA
𒑝	U+1245D	one third variant form			
𒑞	U+1245E	two thirds variant form			
𒑟	U+1245F	one eighth			
𒑠	U+12460	one quarter			
𒑡	U+12461	Old Assyrian one sixth	630		Kültepe only
𒑢	U+12462	Old Assyrian one quarter			
𒑰	U+12470	Old Assyrian word divider			
𒑱	U+12471	vertical colon	592		Glossenkeil
𒑲	U+12472	diagonal colon	592		Glossenkeil
𒑳	U+12473	diagonal tricolon			

== History ==
The following Unicode-related documents record the purpose and process of defining specific characters in the Cuneiform Numbers and Punctuation block:

Version	Final code points (Note: Proposed code points and characters names may differ from final code points and names)	Count	L2 ID	WG2 ID	Document
5.0	U+12400..12462, 12470..12473	103	L2/00-128		Bunz, Carl-Martin (2000-03-01), Scripts from the Past in Future Versions of Unicode
5.0	U+12400..12462, 12470..12473	103	L2/00-153		Bunz, Carl-Martin (2000-04-26), Further comments on historic scripts
5.0	U+12400..12462, 12470..12473	103	L2/00-398		Snyder, Dean (2000-11-07), Cuneiform: From Clay Tablet to Computer
5.0	U+12400..12462, 12470..12473	103	L2/00-419	N2297	Everson, Michael (2000-11-20), Legacy cuneiform font implementations and the ICE project
5.0	U+12400..12462, 12470..12473	103	L2/03-162	N2585	Everson, Michael; Feuerherm, Karljürgen (2003-05-25), Basic principles for the encoding of Sumero-Akkadian Cuneiform
5.0	U+12400..12462, 12470..12473	103	L2/03-415		Snyder, Dean (2003-11-01), Proposal to Encode the Sumero-Akkadian Cuneiform Script in the UCS
5.0	U+12400..12462, 12470..12473	103	L2/03-393R	N2664R	Everson, Michael; Feuerherm, Karljürgen; Tinney, Steve (2003-11-03), Preliminary proposal to encode Cuneiform script in the SMP of the UCS
5.0	U+12400..12462, 12470..12473	103	L2/03-416		Anderson, Lloyd (2003-11-03), The Cuneiform Encoding Proposal -- a View of its Current Status
5.0	U+12400..12462, 12470..12473	103	L2/04-080		Tinney, Steve (2004-01-24), Rationale for changes to N2664R
5.0	U+12400..12462, 12470..12473	103	L2/04-036	N2698	Everson, Michael; Feuerherm, Karljürgen; Tinney, Steve (2004-01-29), Revised proposal to encode Cuneiform script in the SMP of the UCS
5.0	U+12400..12462, 12470..12473	103	L2/04-041		Anderson, Lloyd (2004-01-29), Fitting Cuneiform Encoding to Cuneiform Script
5.0	U+12400..12462, 12470..12473	103	L2/04-059		Feuerherm, Karljürgen (2004-01-30), Short Response to L2/04-041 "Fitting Cuneiform Encoding to Cuneiform Script"
5.0	U+12400..12462, 12470..12473	103	L2/04-063		Gewecke, Tom (2004-01-30), Re: Cuneiform at UTC
5.0	U+12400..12462, 12470..12473	103	L2/04-056		Veldhuis, Niek (2004-01-31), Letter re "Cuneiform Unicode"
5.0	U+12400..12462, 12470..12473	103	L2/04-057		Jones, Charles E. (2004-02-01), Letter re "Cuneiform"
5.0	U+12400..12462, 12470..12473	103	L2/04-058		Michalowski, Piotr (2004-02-01), Letter re "cuneiform unicode"
5.0	U+12400..12462, 12470..12473	103	L2/04-064		Cooper, Jerry (2004-02-01), Letter re "unicode proposal"
5.0	U+12400..12462, 12470..12473	103	L2/04-066		Durusau, Patrick (2004-02-02), Letter re "Proposal N2698"
5.0	U+12400..12462, 12470..12473	103	L2/04-081		Black, Jeremy (2004-02-02), Letter re "cuneiform Unicode proposal"
5.0	U+12400..12462, 12470..12473	103	L2/04-086		Anderson, Lloyd (2004-02-03), Notes for verbal presentation to UTC meeting, 3 February 2004
5.0	U+12400..12462, 12470..12473	103	L2/04-099		Anderson, Lloyd (2004-02-09), Unification of cuneiform numbers
5.0	U+12400..12462, 12470..12473	103	L2/04-225		Anderson, Lloyd (2004-06-07), Proposed modifications to introductory text of N2798 = L204-189 Proposal for Cuneiform Encoding
5.0	U+12400..12462, 12470..12473	103	L2/04-189	N2786	Everson, Michael; Feuerherm, Karljürgen; Tinney, Steve (2004-06-08), Final proposal to encode Cuneiform script
5.0	U+12400..12462, 12470..12473	103	L2/04-223R		Anderson, Lloyd (2004-06-11), Proposed modifications to delete and add signs to N2798 = L204-189 Proposal for Cuneiform Encoding
5.0	U+12400..12462, 12470..12473	103	L2/04-354		McGowan, Rick (2004-09-20), Cuneiform Properties
5.0	U+12400..12462, 12470..12473	103	L2/05-135		Tinney, Steve (2005-05-10), Corrections to N2786
5.0	U+12400..12462, 12470..12473	103	L2/05-174		Everson, Michael (2005-07-28), Irish comments on Cuneiform
5.0	U+12400..12462, 12470..12473	103	L2/05-108R		Moore, Lisa (2005-08-26), "Cuneiform (C.17)", UTC #103 Minutes
5.0	U+12400..12462, 12470..12473	103		N2953 (pdf, doc)	Umamaheswaran, V. S. (2006-02-16), "M47.12", Unconfirmed minutes of WG 2 meeting 47, Sophia Antipolis, France; 2005-09-12/15
5.0	U+12400..12462, 12470..12473	103	L2/12-112		Moore, Lisa (2012-05-17), "Consensus 131-C30", UTC #131 / L2 #228 Minutes, "Change the numeric values for 1240F..12414 to 40..90, for Unicode 6.2."
5.0	U+12400..12462, 12470..12473	103	L2/12-240		Davis, Mark (2012-07-20), Property Issues for U6.2
5.0	U+12400..12462, 12470..12473	103	L2/12-239		Moore, Lisa (2012-08-14), "Consensus 132-C19", UTC #132 Minutes, "Give U+12432 and U+12433 the numeric type "numeric" and the numeric values 216,000, and 432,000 respectively. Make U+12456 and 12457 have the numeric type "numeric" and value "-1"."
5.0	U+12400..12462, 12470..12473	103	L2/12-328		Anderson, Deborah (2012-10-16), Numeric value fixes for two cuneiform characters
5.0	U+12400..12462, 12470..12473	103	L2/12-343R2		Moore, Lisa (2012-12-04), "Consensus 133-C30", UTC #133 Minutes, "Change the numeric value of U+12456 to 2 and U+12457 to 3, for Unicode 6.3."
7.0	U+12463..1246E, 12474	13	L2/12-002	N4178R	Everson, Michael; Tinney, Steve (2012-01-16), Proposal for additions and corrections to Sumero-Akkadian Cuneiform
7.0	U+12463..1246E, 12474	13	L2/12-207R	N4277R	Everson, Michael; Tinney, Steve (2012-07-31), Proposal for additions and corrections to Sumero-Akkadian Cuneiform
7.0	U+12463..1246E, 12474	13	L2/12-239		Moore, Lisa (2012-08-14), "C.3", UTC #132 Minutes
18.0	U+1246F, 12475..1247F	12	L2/24-270		Leroy, Robin; Tinney, Steve (2024-12-17), Twelve cuneiform tenû numerals
18.0	U+1246F, 12475..1247F	12	L2/25-010		Kučera, Jan; et al. (2025-01-16), "1.1 Twelve cuneiform tenû numerals", Recommendations to UTC #182 (January 2025) on Script Proposals
18.0	U+1246F, 12475..1247F	12	L2/25-003		Leroy, Robin (2025-01-28), "Consensus 182-C3", UTC #182 Minutes, "Provisionally assign 12 code points ..."
18.0	U+1246F, 12475..1247F	12	L2/25-226		"Consensus 185-C40", UTC #185 Minutes, 2025-10-29, "UTC accepts for encoding in Unicode 18.0 ..."

== See also ==
- List of cuneiform signs
