= Archaic Cuneiform Numerals =

- Range: U+12550..U+1268F (320 code points)
- Plane: SMP
- Scripts: Cuneiform (147 char.); Proto Cuneiform (164 char.)
- Assigned: 311 code points
- Unused: 9 reserved code points

Unicode Version History
- 18.0 (2026): 311 (+311)

Unicode documentation
- Code chart ∣ Web page

Archaic Cuneiform Numerals is a Unicode block containing cuneiform numerals used in the fourth millennium BCE (Uruk IV and Uruk III periods) and the third millennium BCE (Early Dynastic period).

== Block ==
Archaic Cuneiform Numerals^{[1]}^{[2]} Official Unicode Consortium code chart (PDF)
	0	1	2	3	4	5	6	7	8	9	A	B	C	D	E	F
U+1255x	𒕐	𒕑	𒕒	𒕓	𒕔	𒕕	𒕖	𒕗	𒕘	𒕙	𒕚	𒕛	𒕜	𒕝	𒕞	𒕟
U+1256x	𒕠	𒕡	𒕢	𒕣	𒕤	𒕥	𒕦	𒕧	𒕨	𒕩	𒕪	𒕫	𒕬	𒕭	𒕮	𒕯
U+1257x	𒕰	𒕱	𒕲	𒕳	𒕴	𒕵	𒕶	𒕷	𒕸	𒕹	𒕺	𒕻	𒕼	𒕽	𒕾	𒕿
U+1258x	𒖀	𒖁	𒖂	𒖃	𒖄	𒖅	𒖆	𒖇	𒖈	𒖉	𒖊	𒖋	𒖌	𒖍	𒖎	𒖏
U+1259x	𒖐	𒖑	𒖒	𒖓	𒖔	𒖕	𒖖	𒖗	𒖘	𒖙	𒖚	𒖛	𒖜	𒖝	𒖞	𒖟
U+125Ax	𒖠	𒖡	𒖢	𒖣	𒖤	𒖥	𒖦	𒖧	𒖨	𒖩	𒖪	𒖫	𒖬	𒖭	𒖮	𒖯
U+125Bx	𒖰	𒖱	𒖲	𒖳	𒖴	𒖵	𒖶	𒖷	𒖸	𒖹	𒖺	𒖻	𒖼	𒖽	𒖾	𒖿
U+125Cx	𒗀	𒗁	𒗂	𒗃	𒗄	𒗅	𒗆	𒗇	𒗈	𒗉	𒗊	𒗋	𒗌	𒗍	𒗎	𒗏
U+125Dx	𒗐	𒗑	𒗒	𒗓	𒗔	𒗕	𒗖	𒗗	𒗘	𒗙	𒗚	𒗛	𒗜	𒗝	𒗞	𒗟
U+125Ex	𒗠	𒗡	𒗢	𒗣	𒗤	𒗥	𒗦	𒗧	𒗨	𒗩	𒗪	𒗫	𒗬	𒗭	𒗮	𒗯
U+125Fx	𒗰	𒗱	𒗲	𒗳	𒗴	𒗵	𒗶	𒗷	𒗸	𒗹	𒗺	𒗻	𒗼	𒗽	𒗾	𒗿
U+1260x	𒘀	𒘁	𒘂	𒘃	𒘄	𒘅	𒘆	𒘇	𒘈	𒘉	𒘊	𒘋	𒘌	𒘍	𒘎	𒘏
U+1261x	𒘐	𒘑	𒘒	𒘓	𒘔	𒘕	𒘖	𒘗	𒘘	𒘙	𒘚	𒘛	𒘜	𒘝	𒘞	𒘟
U+1262x	𒘠	𒘡	𒘢	𒘣	𒘤	𒘥	𒘦	𒘧	𒘨	𒘩	𒘪	𒘫	𒘬	𒘭	𒘮	𒘯
U+1263x	𒘰	𒘱	𒘲	𒘳	𒘴	𒘵	𒘶	𒘷	𒘸	𒘹	𒘺	𒘻	𒘼	𒘽	𒘾	𒘿
U+1264x	𒙀	𒙁	𒙂	𒙃	𒙄	𒙅	𒙆	𒙇	𒙈	𒙉	𒙊	𒙋	𒙌	𒙍	𒙎	𒙏
U+1265x	𒙐	𒙑	𒙒	𒙓	𒙔	𒙕	𒙖	𒙗	𒙘	𒙙	𒙚	𒙛	𒙜	𒙝	𒙞	𒙟
U+1266x	𒙠	𒙡	𒙢	𒙣	𒙤	𒙥	𒙦	𒙧	𒙨	𒙩	𒙪	𒙫	𒙬	𒙭	𒙮	𒙯
U+1267x	𒙰	𒙱	𒙲	𒙳	𒙴	𒙵	𒙶	𒙷	𒙸	𒙹	𒙺	𒙻	𒙼	𒙽	𒙾	𒙿
U+1268x	𒚀	𒚁	𒚂	𒚃	𒚄	𒚅	𒚆									
Notes 1.As of Unicode version 18.0 2.Grey areas indicate non-assigned code points

== History ==
The following Unicode-related documents record the purpose and process of defining specific characters in the Archaic Cuneiform Numerals block:

Version	Final code points (Note: Proposed code points and characters names may differ from final code points and names)	Count	L2 ID	Document
18.0	U+12550..12686	311	L2/24-210R	Leroy, Robin; Pandey, Anshuman; Tinney, Steve (2024-10-23), Archaic Cuneiform Numerals
18.0	U+12550..12686	311	L2/24-228	Kučera, Jan; et al. (2024-11-01), "2.4 Archaic Cuneiform Numerals", Recommendations to UTC #181 (November 2024) on Script Proposals
18.0	U+12550..12686	311	L2/24-221	Constable, Peter (2024-11-12), "Consensus 181-C31", UTC #181 Minutes, "Provisionally assign 311 code points ..."
18.0	U+12550..12686	311	L2/25-226	"Consensus 185-C39", UTC #185 Minutes, 2025-10-29, "UTC accepts for encoding in Unicode 18.0 ..."

== See also ==
- Cuneiform (Unicode block)
- Cuneiform Numbers and Punctuation (Unicode block)
- Early Dynastic Cuneiform (Unicode block)
