= List of cuneiform signs =

List of written symbols used in the ancient Near East

Cuneiform is one of the earliest systems of writing, emerging in Sumer in the late fourth millennium BC.

Archaic versions of cuneiform writing, including the Ur III (and earlier, ED III cuneiform of literature such as the Barton Cylinder) are not included due to extreme complexity of arranging them consistently and unequivocally by the shape of their signs; see Early Dynastic Cuneiform for the Unicode block.

The columns within the list contain:

1. MesZL: Sign index in Rykle Borger's (2004) Mesopotamisches Zeichenlexikon.
2. ŠL/HA: Sign index in Deimel's Šumerisches Lexikon (ŠL), completed and accommodated in Ellermeier and Studt's Handbuch Assur (HA).
3. aBZL: Sign index in Mittermayer's (2006) Altbabylonische Zeichenliste der sumerisch-literarischen Texte.
4. HethZL: Sign index in Rüster and Neu's (1989) Hethitisches Zeichenlexikon.
5. Sign name according to MesZL, HA etc.
6. Unicode code point. In the case of composite signs without a single dedicated code point, a sequence of the constituent signs' code points, joined by an ampersand ("&").
7. Corresponding Unicode character name(s) as per Unicode 5.0 cuneiform encoding standard, in some cases departing from those typically encountered in the literature.
8. Any further comments.

In MesZL, signs are sorted by their leftmost parts, beginning with horizontal strokes (single AŠ, then stacked TAB, EŠ_{16}), followed by the diagonals GE_{23} and GE_{22}, the Winkelhaken U and finally the vertical DIŠ. The relevant shape for the classification of a sign is the Neo-Assyrian one (after ca. 1000 BC); the standardization of sign shapes of this late period allows systematic arrangement by shape. Note that the actual shape displayed by default by browsers as of 2024 is from a much earlier period during the heyday of Sumerian culture in the 3rd millennium BC.

At Sumerisches-Glossar.de the complete sign list as PDF with all cuneiform signs in their Neo-Assyrian shape and with an introduction by Rykle Borger is to be found.

== AŠ ==
MesZL	ŠL/HA	aBZL	HethZL		Sign Name	Glyph/Unicode Code Point	Unicode Name	Comments
1	001	001	1		AŠ	U+12038 𒀸	ASH	
2	002		1		AŠ.AŠ	U+12400 𒐀	NUMERIC SIGN TWO ASH	"2"
3	002	007	2		ḪAL	U+1212C 𒄬	HAL	
4	002a	002			EŠ_{6} (AŠ.AŠ.AŠ)	U+12401 𒐁	NUMERIC SIGN THREE ASH	"3"
5	009	003	4		BAL	U+12044 𒁄	BAL	
6	010	008	6		GÍR	U+12108 𒄈	GIR2	
7	010	008	6		GÍR-gunû	U+12109 𒄉	GIR2 GUNU	
8	011	013			BÚR	U+12054 𒁔	BUR2	
9	012	231	7		TAR	U+122FB 𒋻	TAR	
10	013	009	8		AN	U+1202D 𒀭	AN	
11	014				AŠ+SUR	U+12038 𒀸 & U+122E9 𒋩	ASH & SUR	ligature
12	003	012	22		MUG	U+1222E 𒈮	MUG	
13	004	011			ZADIM (MUG-gunû)	U+1222F 𒈯	MUG GUNU	
14	005	303	205		BA	U+12040 𒁀	BA	
15	006	304	209		ZU	U+1236A 𒍪	ZU	
16	007	305	213		SU	U+122E2 𒋢	SU	
16	007v	305	213		SUoverSU	U+122E2 𒋢	SU OVER SU	
17	008	306	230		ŠEN (SU×A)	U+122BF 𒊿	SHEN	
18	050	016	16		ARAD	U+12034 𒀴	ARAD	
19	051	017			ÁRAD (ARAD×KUR)	U+12035 𒀵	ARAD TIMES KUR	reconstruction
20	052	334	84		ITI (UD×EŠ)	U+12317 𒌗	UD TIMES U PLUS U PLUS U	
20	052				ITI (UD-šeššig)	U+1231A 𒌚	UD SHESHIG	
21	052xv				ÍTI (ITI×BAD)	U+1231B 𒌛	UD SHESHIG TIMES BAD	
22	053	004			ŠUBUR	U+122DA 𒋚	SHUBUR	Subartu, which is a region of upper Mesopotamia in the Bronze Age, which later came to be called Assyria.
23	053		309		ŠAḪ	Neo-Assyrian: use U+122DA 𒋚 (ŠUBUR)		
24	015	312	133		KA	U+12157 𒅗	KA	DUG4, DUGA4, DU11
25	015x				KA×GÍR	U+12168 𒅨	KA TIMES GIR2	uncertain
26	016	325	146		TU_{6} (KA×LI)	U+12172 𒅲	KA TIMES LI	
27	15xx				KA×TU	U+12386 𒎆	KA TIMES TU	variant of n72 URU×TU
28	016a				KA×RU	U+1217D 𒅽	KA TIMES RU	
29	017	314			UŠ_{11} (KA×BAD)	U+1215C 𒅜	KA TIMES BAD	
30	017an		134		KA×MAŠ/BAR	U+1215E 𒅞	KA TIMES BAR	
31	018v	315	135		NUNDUM (KA×NUN)	U+1217B 𒅻	KA TIMES NUN	
32	018x	316	136		SU_{6} (KA×SA)	U+1217E 𒅾	KA TIMES SA	
33	019	321			PÙ (KA×KÁR)	U+12164 𒅤	KA TIMES GAN2 TENU	
34	020				KA× AD.KUG	U+1215A 𒅚	KA TIMES AD PLUS KU3	
35	022x	313			KA×NE	U+1217A 𒅺	KA TIMES NE	
36	022xn1		137		KA×ÚR	U+12387 𒎇	KA TIMES UR2	Hitt.
37	023				KA×KIB	U+1216A 𒅪	KA TIMES GISH CROSSING GISH	
38	023n		140		KA×GAG	U+1216F 𒅯	KA TIMES KAK	
39	022xn2				KA×UŠ	U+1218B 𒆋	KA TIMES USH	
40	023n2		138		KA×PA	U+12384 𒎄	KA TIMES PA	Hitt.
41	023n3		139		KA×GIŠ	U+12380 𒎀	KA TIMES GISH	Hitt.
42	024	319			KA×ŠID	U+12182 𒆂	KA TIMES SHID	
43	024x				KA×Ú	U+12188 𒆈	KA TIMES U2	
44	025	318			KAxGA	U+12162 𒅢	KA TIMES GA	
45	021	324			KA×SAR	U+1217F 𒅿	KA TIMES SAR	
46	025n				KA×ÁŠ	U+1215B 𒅛	KA TIMES ASH2	
47	025b	317			KA×DÚB/BALAG	U+1215D 𒅝	KA TIMES BALAG	
48	025c				KA×ŠA	U+12180 𒆀	KA TIMES SHA	
49	026	320			ŠÙDU (KA×ŠU)	U+12183 𒆃	KA TIMES SHU	
50	027	323	145		KA×ŠE	U+12181 𒆁	KA TIMES SHE	
51	028		143		KA×UD	U+12189 𒆉	KA TIMES UD	
52	028n				KA×PI	U+1217C 𒅼	KA TIMES PI	
53	029x				KA×ERIM	U+12160 𒅠	KA TIMES ERIN2	variant of n129 AG×ERIM
54	030	322	144		BÚN (KA×IM)	U+1216E 𒅮	KA TIMES IM	
55	030n				KA×ḪAR			
56	031n1		141		KA×U	U+12187 𒆇	KA TIMES U	Hitt.
57	031				KA×MI	U+12178 𒅸	KA TIMES MI	
58	031xx				KA×"EŠ"			variant of n32 KA×SA
59	031n2				KA×IGI	U+1216D 𒅭	KA TIMES IGI	variant of n79 URU×IGI
60	031x				KA×KI	U+12170 𒅰	KA TIMES KI	
61	032	326	147		EME (KA×ME)	U+12174 𒅴	KA TIMES ME	
61	032n1				KA× ME.GI	U+12176 𒅶	KA TIMES ME PLUS GI	
61	032n2				KA× ME.DU	U+12175 𒅵	KA TIMES ME PLUS DU	
61	032n3				KA× ME.TE	U+12177 𒅷	KA TIMES ME PLUS TE	
62	033	327			KA×ŠÈ	U+12161 𒅡	KA TIMES ESH2	
63	033n				KA×GUR_{7}	U+1216C 𒅬	KA TIMES GUR7	
64	035	328	148		NAG (KA×A)	U+12158 𒅘	KA TIMES A	
65	036	329	149		GU_{7} (KA×NÍG)	U+12165 𒅥	KA TIMES GAR	
66	036a				KA× KADRA(NÍG.ŠÀ.A)	U+12166 𒅦	KA TIMES GAR PLUS SHA3 PLUS A	
67	036an		150		KA×ÀŠ			Hitt.
68	035n				KA×SIG	U+12184 𒆄	KA TIMES SIG	
69	034				KA×GU	U+1216B 𒅫	KA TIMES GU	
70	034n		142		KA×LUM			
71	038	181	229		URU (IRI)	U+12337 𒌷	URU	ERI, IRI, RE2, RI2, U19
72	039	188			URU×TU	U+1234B 𒍋	URU TIMES TU	variant of n27
73	040	186	134		UKKIN (URU×MAŠ/BAR)	U+1233A 𒌺	URU TIMES BAR	
74	043v	187			URU×KÁR	U+1233E 𒌾	URU TIMES GAN2 TENU	
75	041	182	(229)		BANŠUR (URU×URUDU)	U+1234E 𒍎	URU TIMES URUDA	
76	042	183			ŠÀKIR (URU×GA)	U+1233C 𒌼	URU TIMES GA	
77	043				ÚRU (URU×UD)	U+1234D 𒍍	URU TIMES UD	
78	045				URU×UL	U+1234C 𒍌	URU TIMES U PLUS GUD	
79	044	184			ASARI (URU×IGI)	U+12342 𒍂	URU TIMES IGI	
80	49x	189			GIŠGAL (URU×MIN)	U+12347 𒍇	URU TIMES MIN	
81	46xxx				URU×A	U+12338 𒌸	URU TIMES A	
82	047	190			URU×ḪA	U+12341 𒍁	URU TIMES HA	
83	049	191			ÈRIM (URU×NÍG)	U+1233F 𒌿	URU TIMES GAR	
84	046	185			URU×GU (GUR_{5})	U+12340 𒍀	URU TIMES GU	
85	059	381	343		LI	U+121F7 𒇷	LI	
86	058	382	346		TU	U+12305 𒌅	TU	
87	058	375			KU_{4}	U+121AD 𒆭	KU4	
88	058	283	315		GUR_{8} (TE-gunû)	U+122FD 𒋽	TE GUNU	
89	055	177	95		LA	U+121B7 𒆷	LA	
90	056	005	9		APIN (ENGAR)	U+12033 𒀳	APIN	
91	057	006	10		MAḪ	U+12224 𒈤	MAH	
92	060	249	256(1)		PAB or PAP	U+1227D 𒉽	PAP	
92	060a				UTUKI (KÚR.IR.GÍDIM)	U+12359 𒍙	UTUKI	belongs to n585
93	060+002		256(2)		PÚŠ (PAB.ḪAL)	U+1227D 𒉽 & U+1212C 𒄬	PAP & HAL	
94	060+060	264	257		BÙLUG	U+1227D 𒉽 & U+1227D 𒉽	PAP & PAP	
95	060+212				PAB.IŠ (PA_{6})	U+1227D 𒉽 & U+12156 𒅖	PAP & ISH	
96	060+308				PAB.E (PA_{5})	U+1227D 𒉽 & U+1208A 𒂊	PAP & E	
96	308n2				ExPAB	U+1208B 𒂋	E TIMES PAP	reconstruction
97	060x	268			GÀM (PAB.NÁ)	U+1219B 𒆛	KAM4	
98	061	020	17		MU	U+1222C 𒈬	MU	
99	062	269	21		SÌLA	U+122E1 𒋡	SILA3	
100	065				ŠEŠLAM	U+122C2 𒋂	SHESHLAM	
101	066				ZIoverZI	U+12364 𒍤	ZI OVER ZI	
102	066c	149			NÚMUN (ZIoverZI.LAGAB)	U+12364 𒍤 & U+121B8 𒆸	ZI OVER ZI & LAGAB	
103	066b	150			ZIoverZI.ŠÈ	U+12364 𒍤 & U+120A0 𒂠	ZI OVER ZI & ESH2	
104	066a	151			ZIoverZI.A	U+12364 𒍤 & U+12000 𒀀	ZI OVER ZI & A	
105	067	250	258		GIL (GIoverGI parall. or crossing)	U+12103 𒄃	GI CROSSING GI	
106	063d	058	227		KÍD (TAG_{4})	U+122FA 𒋺	TAK4	
107	063d				NUNcrossingNUN	U+1226B 𒉫	NUN CROSSING NUN	
108	063a				KÁD	U+12190 𒆐	KAD2	
109	063c		(227)		KÀD	U+12191 𒆑	KAD3	
110	070	024	15		NA	U+1223E 𒈾	NA	
111	068	060	43		RU	U+12292 𒊒	RU	
112	075	019	11		NU	U+12261 𒉡	NU	
113	069	025	13		BAD	U+12041 𒁁	BAD	
113	069	025	13		IDIM	U+12142 𒅂	IDIM	
113	069	025	13		TIL	U+12300 𒌀	TIL	
113	069	025	13		ÚŠ	U+12357 𒍗	USH2	
114	069	025	13		ÈŠE (AŠ+U)	U+12458 𒑘	NUMERIC SIGN ONE ESHE3	
115	071	028	5		ŠIR	U+122D3 𒋓	SHIR	
115	071	028	5		ŠIR	U+12262 𒉢	NU11	
116	071n	464			ŠIR-tenû	U+122D4 𒋔	SHIR TENU	
117	072	026	12		NUMUN	U+121B0 𒆰	KUL	
117	072a				NUMUN-gunû	U+121B1 𒆱	KUL GUNU	
118	073	023	37		TI	U+122FE 𒋾	TI	
118	073av				TI-tenû	U+122FF 𒋿	TI TENU	
119	465	361	330		DIN	U+12077 𒁷	DIN	
119	465+166 +350+480				DIN.KASKAL.SIG_{7}	U+12078 𒁸	CUNEIFORM SIGN DIN KASKAL U GUNU DISH	
120	74	029	20		MAŠ	U+12226 𒈦	MASH	
121	74	057	20		BAR	U+12047 𒁇	BAR	
122	74	029	20		BÁN	U+1244F 𒑏	NUMERIC SIGN ONE BAN2	
123	074_182				KÚNGA (BAR.AN)	U+12047 𒁇 & U+1202D 𒀭	BAR & AN	
124	074_238	030(IDIGNA) 087(DALLA)	253		IDIGNA (DALLA/MAŠ.GÚ.GÀR)	U+12226 𒈦 & U+12118 𒄘 & U+120FC 𒃼	MAŠ & GU2 & GAR3	
125	074_335				GÍDIM (MAŠ.U)	U+12226 𒈦 & U+1230B 𒌋	MASH & U	
126	074+471				MAŠ.MAN	U+12226 𒈦 & U+12399 𒎙	MASH & U U	
127	097	052	81		AG	U+1201D 𒀝	AK	
128	097a				AG×ŠÍTA	U+1201F 𒀟	AK TIMES SHITA PLUS GISH	
129	098	053	82		MÈ (AG×ERIM)	U+1201E 𒀞	AK TIMES ERIN2	
130	076	031	38		MÁŠ	U+12227 𒈧	MASH2	
131	077	032	35		KUN	U+121B2 𒆲	KUN	
132	078	034	24		ḪU	U+12137 𒄷	HU	
133	078a	033	25		U_{5}	ePSD s.v. u_{5} HU.SI erroneous. Sign not splittable!		
134	079	042	39		NAM	U+12246 𒉆	NAM	
135	79av	043	39(2)	.	BURU_{5} (NAM.ERIM) etc.	U+12246 𒉆 & U+1209F 𒂟 etc.	NAM & ERIN2	U+12245 𒉅 NAM NUTILLU: uncertain
136	080	061	67		IG (GÁL)	U+12145 𒅅	IG	
137	081	035	26		MUD	U+12137 𒄷 & U+1212D 𒄭	HU & HI	
138	082	036			SA_{4} (ḪU.NÁ)	U+12137 𒄷 & U+1223F 𒈿	HU & NA2	
139	083	038	29		ŠÌTA (RAD)	U+122E5 𒋥	SUD2	
140	084	041	33		ZI	U+12363 𒍣	ZI	
141	085	040	30		GI	U+12100 𒄀	GI	
141	085n2(v)		31		GI×E	U+12101 𒄁	GI TIMES E	Hitt. esp. Hurr.
142	086	039	32		RI	U+12291 𒊑	RI	
143	087	047	36		NUN	U+12263 𒉣	NUN	
144	087	241			NUN-tenû	U+12269 𒉩	NUN TENU	
145	087a	048	34		TÙR (NUN.LAGAR)	U+12263 𒉣 & U+121EC 𒇬	NUN & LAGAR	
145	063_27n				NUNcrossingNUN. LAGARoverLAGAR	U+1226C 𒉬	NUN CROSSING NUN LAGAR OVER LAGAR	to n147 also
146	087aa				IMMAL (NUN. LAGAR×BAR/MAŠ)	U+12265 𒉥	NUN LAGAR TIMES MASH	
146'	087aan				TÙR×UŠ	U+12268 𒉨	NUN LAGAR TIMES USH	
146"	087cn				TÙR×NÍG	U+12264 𒉤	NUN LAGAR TIMES GAR	
147	087b; 460x	049			ŠILAM (NUN. LAGAR×MUNUS)	U+12266 𒉦	NUN LAGAR TIMES SAL	
147	087c				ŠILAMoverŠILAM	U+12267 𒉧	NUN LAGAR TIMES SAL OVER NUN LAGAR TIMES SAL	
148	088	226	49		KAB	U+1218F 𒆏	KAB	
149	088	445	49		ḪÚB	U+12138 𒄸	HUB2	
150	089	446	50		ḪUB (ḪÚB×UD)	U+1213D 𒄽	HUB2 TIMES UD	
151	101	056	42		SUR (ŠUR)	U+122E9 𒋩	SUR	
152	102	045			MÚŠ (MÙŠ-gunû)	U+1223D 𒈽	MUSH3 GUNU	
153	103v	044	41		MÙŠ (INANNA)	U+12239 𒈹	MUSH3	
154	103a	046	27		MÙŠxA	U+1223A 𒈺	MUSH3 TIMES A	
155	103b				SED (MÙŠ× A.DI)	U+1223B 𒈻	MUSH3 TIMES A PLUS DI	
156	103cv				MÙŠ×ZA			
157	090	299	173		GAD	U+120F0 𒃰	GAD	
158	092				GAD.KÍD	U+120F0 𒃰 & U+122FA 𒋺	GAD & TAK4	
159	092a	300			AKKIL (GAD.KÍD.SI)	U+120F0 𒃰 & U+122FA 𒋺 & U+122DB 𒋛	GAD & TAK4 & SI	
160	092b	301	166		UMBIN (GAD.KÍD.ÚR)	U+12322 𒌢	UMBIN	
161	092c				SIG_{8} (GAD.KÍD.GIŠ)	U+120F0 𒃰 & U+122FA 𒋺 & U+12111 𒄑	GAD & TAK4 & GISH	
162	093	302	85		ŠINIG (GAD.NAGA)	U+122D2 𒋒	SHINIG	
163	091	336			KINDA (GAD.NÍGoverGAD.NÍG)	U+120F1 𒃱	GAD OVER GAD GAR OVER GAR	
164	099	062	40		EN	U+12097 𒂗	EN	
164	099c				ENME	U+1209A 𒂚	EN TIMES ME	
164	099a1				ENoverENcrossed	U+1209B 𒂛	EN CROSSING EN	
164	099b1				4×ENsquared	U+1209D 𒂝	EN SQUARED	
164	099b2				"4×EN" (KUoverḪAR.KUoverḪAR)	U+121AB 𒆫	KU OVER HI TIMES ASH2 KU OVER HI TIMES ASH2	
164	099b3				AŠ.KU.KUoverAŠ.KU.KU .KÚR	U+1203B 𒀻	ASH OVER ASH TUG2 OVER TUG2 TUG2 OVER TUG2 PAP	
165	054	063	274		BURU_{14} (EN×KÁR/EN×GÁN)	U+12098 𒂘	EN TIMES GAN2	
165	054v				EN×KÁR (GÁN-tenû)	U+12099 𒂙	EN TIMES GAN2 TENU	reconstruction
166	100; 063x	365	71		DÀR	U+12070 𒁰	DARA3	
167	094	014	14		DIM	U+12074 𒁴	DIM	
168	095, 095v	015	18		DIM×ŠE, later DIM×KUR	U+12075 𒁵	DIM TIMES SHE	
169	096	018			BULUG	U+12051 𒁑	BULUG	
169	096a	018			MÉNBULUG (BULUGoverBULUG)	U+12051 𒁑	BULUG OVER BULUG	
170	109	124	170		LÀL (TA×ḪI)	U+122ED 𒋭	TA TIMES HI	
171	110	070	184		KU_{7}	U+121AF 𒆯	KU7	
172	104	147	200		SA	U+12293 𒊓	SA	
173	104_6	443	80		AŠGAB	U+1203F 𒀿	ASHGAB	
174	105	106	61		GÁN	U+120F7 𒃷	GAN2	
174	105n2				GÁNoverGÁN	U+120F9 𒃹	GAN2 OVER GAN2	to be deleted
175	105	246			KÁR (GÁN-tenû and ŠÈ-tenû)	U+120F8 𒃸	GAN2 TENU	
176	106	089	201		GÚ (TIK)	U+12118 𒄘	GU2	
177	107n	090			USAN (GÚ×NUN, GÚ.NUN)	U+1211B 𒄛	GU2 TIMES NUN	
178	108	088	202		DUR (GÚxGAG, GÚ.GAG)	U+12119 𒄙	GU2 TIMES KAK	
179	108x	089	201		GUN (GÚ.UN)	U+12118 𒄘 & U+12327 𒌧	GU2 & UN	
180	111	092	185		GUR	U+12125 𒄥	GUR	
181	112	164	86		SI	U+122DB 𒋛	SI	Verb meaning "to fill", which has more active force than the intransitive verb TUŠ (to sit, dwell), having a highly ideological meaning.
182	113	165			SU_{4} (SI-gunû)	U+122DC 𒋜	SI GUNU	
183	113	037	83		DAR (GÙN; ḪU-gunû, SI-gunû)	U+1206F 𒁯	DAR	
183	114				DAR (GÙN; ḪU-gunû, SI-gunû)			variant of n183
184	115	309	192		SAG	U+12295 𒊕	SAG	
184	115n2	309	192		SAGoverSAG	U+122A7 𒊧	SAG OVER SAG	
185	115n				SAG×NUN	U+1229E 𒊞	SAG TIMES NUN	
186	118				SAG×UM	U+122A4 𒊤	SAG TIMES UM	
187	121_6				SAG×DU	U+12297 𒊗	SAG TIMES DU	
188	116	330			SAG×GAG	U+1229A 𒊚	SAG TIMES KAK	
189	121_5				SAG×NI			uncertain
190	116n				SAG×UŠ	U+122A6 𒊦	SAG TIMES USH	
191	117	310			DÌLIB (SAG×ŠID)	U+122A0 𒊠	SAG TIMES SHID	
192	121_8				SAG×Ú	U+122A2 𒊢	SAG TIMES U2	
193	121_7				SAG×UB	U+122A3 𒊣	SAG TIMES UB	
194	121_10				SAG×SIG_{7}			
195	119				KÀN (SAG×MI)	U+1229D 𒊝	SAG TIMES MI	
196	121				SAG×UR	U+122A5 𒊥	SAG TIMES UR	
197	121n				SAG×A	U+12296 𒊖	SAG TIMES A	
198	121_1				SAG×ḪA	U+12299 𒊙	SAG TIMES HA	
199	120				SAG×MUNUS	U+1229F 𒊟	SAG TIMES SAL	
200	120n				SAG×LUM	U+1229C 𒊜	SAG TIMES LUM	
201	122	050	87		MÁ	U+12223 𒈣	MA2	
202	122a	051			DIMGUL ("MÁ.MUG")	U+12223 𒈣 & U+1222E 𒈮	MA2 & MUG	
203	122b	054	23		ÙZ ("MÁ.KASKAL")	U+1235A 𒍚	UZ3	
204	122c				ÙZ.KASKAL	U+1235B 𒍛	UZ3 TIMES KASKAL	
205	122d	055			SUR_{9} (MÁ.KASKAL.SIG_{7} and similar)	U+122EA 𒋪	SUR9	
206	122dv				SUR_{10} (MÁ.SIG_{7} and similar)			
207	123	164	89		DIR(SI.A)	U+122DB 𒋛 & U+12000 𒀀	SI & A	
208	123n				"nìq"			see MesZL n208

== TAB (two AŠ) ==
MesZL	ŠL/HA	aBZL	HethZL	Sign Name	Unicode Code point	Unicode Name	Comments
209	124	109	90	TAB	U+122F0 𒋰	TAB	"2"
209	127	109	90	4×TAB forming a cross	U+122F2 𒋲	TAB SQUARED	see MesZL n503
209	125a	109	90	TABoverTAB.NIoverNI.DIŠoverDIŠ	U+122F1 𒋱	TAB OVER TAB NI OVER NI DISH OVER DISH	
210	124a			EŠ_{21} (TAB.AŠ)	U+1243B 𒐻	NUMERIC SIGN THREE VARIANT FORM ESH21	"3"
211	125n			MEGIDDA (TAB.TI)	U+122F0 𒋰 & U+122FE 𒋾	TAB & TI	
212	210	077	131	GEŠTIN (GIŠ.DIN)	U+120FE 𒃾	GESHTIN	
213	210a			GEŠTIN×KUR	U+120FF 𒃿	GESHTIN TIMES KUR	
214	125v			MÉGIDDA (TAB.KUN)	U+122F0 𒋰 & U+121B2 𒆲	TAB & KUN	
215	124_42	110		LÍMMU (TAB.TAB)	U+121F9 𒇹	LIMMU2	
215	124_42	110		LÍMMU (TAB.TAB)	U+12402 𒐂	NUMERIC SIGN FOUR ASH	"4"
216	125b			IA_{7} (TAB.TAB.AŠ)	U+12403 𒐃	NUMERIC SIGN FIVE ASH	"5"
217	125c			AŠ_{4} (TAB.TAB.TAB)	U+12404 𒐄	NUMERIC SIGN SIX ASH	"6"
218	125d			ÍMIN (TAB.TAB.TAB.AŠ)	U+12405 𒐅	NUMERIC SIGN SEVEN ASH	"7"
219	125e			ÚSSU (TAB.TAB.TAB.TAB)	U+12406 𒐆	NUMERIC SIGN EIGHT ASH	"8"
220	125f			ÍLIMMU (TAB.TAB.TAB.TAB.AŠ)	U+12407 𒐇	NUMERIC SIGN NINE ASH	"9"
221	126	122	91	TAG (ŠUM)	U+122F3 𒋳	TAG	
221	126bv	122	91	TAG×GU_{4}	U+122F5 𒋵	TAG TIMES GUD	
221	126cv	122	91	TAG×ŠU	U+122F7 𒋷	TAG TIMES SHU	
221	126dv	122	91	TAG×UD	U+122F9 𒋹	TAG TIMES UD	
221	126fv	122	91	TAG×TÚG	U+122F8 𒋸	TAG TIMES TUG2	
222	133	175	167	KÁ	U+1218D 𒆍	KA2	
223	128	125	97	AB	U+1200A 𒀊	AB	
224	128xv			AB×NUN			
225	198			AB×KÁR	U+1200E 𒀎	AB TIMES GAN2 TENU	
226	200c			AB×ŠEŠ	U+12013 𒀓	AB TIMES SHESH	
227	200an	127		AB×ÁŠ	U+1200B 𒀋	AB TIMES ASH2	reconstruction
228	194	128		URUGAL (AB×GAL)	U+1200D 𒀍	AB TIMES GAL	
229	196			AB×SIG_{7}	U+12010 𒀐	AB TIMES IGI GUNU	
230	132	111	109	URUDU (URUDA)	U+1234F 𒍏	URUDA	
231	128xxxx			AB×U			
231	200bn			AB×AŠ			
232	195	129	111	UNUG (AB-gunû and/or AB×EŠ)	U+12015 𒀕	AB GUNU	
232	195	129	111	UNUG (AB-gunû and/or AB×EŠ)	U+12014 𒀔	AB TIMES U PLUS U PLUS U	
233	197			AB×KI			
234	198a			AB×LAGAB	U+12012 𒀒	AB TIMES LAGAB	
235	199			AB×GÍN	U+1200C 𒀌	AB TIMES DUN3 GUNU	
236	200v	131		NINA (AB×ḪA)	U+1200F 𒀏	AB TIMES HA	
237	200d			AB×IMIN	U+12011 𒀑	AB TIMES IMIN	
238	134	113	98	UM	U+1231D 𒌝	UM	
239	135a		to 109	UM×U	U+12321 𒌡	UM TIMES U	
239	132n1		to 109	URUDU×U	U+12350 𒍐	URUDA TIMES U	old
240	316			UM× U.LAGAB			
240	132n2			URUDU× U.LAGAB			old
241	137			UM× ME.DA	U+1231F 𒌟	UM TIMES ME PLUS DA	
242	138	112b	99	DUB	U+1207E 𒁾	DUB	
243	138a			DUB×ŠE			
244	135			DUB×ŠÀ			U+12320 𒌠 UM TIMES SHA3 to be deleted
245	136; 316v1			DUB×LAGAB			U+1231E 𒌞 UM TIMES LAGAB to be deleted
246	129		100	NAB (ANoverAN)	U+1202E 𒀮	AN OVER AN	
247	129a	010	101	MUL (ANoverAN .AN)	U+1202F 𒀯	AN THREE TIMES	
248	139	123	160	TA	U+122EB 𒋫	TA	
248	139n2	123	160	TA*	U+122EC 𒋬	TA ASTERISK	Neo-Assyrian
249	141a			TA-gunû	U+122EF 𒋯	TA GUNU	
250	141			TA×ḪI	U+122ED 𒋭	TA TIMES HI	
251	140			TA×MI	U+122EE 𒋮	TA TIMES MI	
252	142	192	217	I	U+1213F 𒄿	I	
253	143	120	113	GAN	U+120F6 𒃶	GAN	
254	143			KÁM			
255	144	393	237	TUR (DUMU)	U+12309 𒌉	TUR	
256	144n			TUR.DIŠ	U+12309 𒌉 & U+12079 𒁹	TUR & DISH	
257	144f			ZIZNA (TURoverTUR.ZAoverZA)	U+1230A 𒌊	TUR OVER TUR ZA OVER ZA	
258	145	132	105	AD	U+1201C 𒀜	AD	
259	147	126	108	ZÍ( AB×PA)	U+12362 𒍢	ZE2	
260	142a	193	218	IA (I.A)	U+12140 𒅀	I A	
261	148	386	354	IN	U+12154 𒅔	IN	
262	149	221b		RAB	U+12290 𒊐	RAB	in old texts = n266 LUGAL
263	150v1			DIM_{8} (RAB.GAN)	U+12290 𒊐 & U+120F6 𒃶	RAB & GAN	
264	150	254	116	DÌM (RAB.GAM)	U+12290 𒊐 & U+120F5 𒃵	RAB & GAM	
265	150v3			DIM_{10} (RAB.KAM*)			to n264
266	151	221a	115	LUGAL	U+12217 𒈗	LUGAL	
266	151vn			LUGALoverLUGAL	U+12218 𒈘	LUGAL OVER LUGAL	
267	150v2			DIM_{9} (LUGAL.GAN)	U+12217 𒈗 & U+120F6 𒃶	LUGAL & GAN	to n264
268	151v			LUGAL.LUGALinversum	U+12219 𒈙	LUGAL OPPOSING LUGAL	to n266
269	150v4			DIM_{11} (LUGAL.KAM*)			to n264
270	146	218	219	ḪAŠḪUR (MA-gunû)	U+12222 𒈢	MA GUNU	
271	152	152a,b,c	106	EZEN	U+120A1 𒂡	EZEN	
271	152	152a,b,c	106	EZEN(KEŠDA)	U+1219F 𒆟	KESH2	
272	152_8b			BÀD (UG_{5} (EZEN×AN))	U+120A1 𒂡	EZEN TIMES AN	old form of n275 EZEN×BAD
273	153			EZEN×LI	U+120B1 𒂱	EZEN TIMES LI	
274	152_9	154		EZEN×LA	U+120AF 𒂯	EZEN TIMES LA	
275	152_8	153	114	BÀD (UG_{5} (EZEN×BAD))	U+120A6 𒂦	EZEN TIMES BAD	see also n272
276	153_1			EZEN×SI			uncertain
277	152_4	157		UBARA (EZEN×KASKAL)	U+120AC 𒂬	EZEN TIMES KASKAL	
277	152_4v			4×UBARA forming a cross	U+120AD 𒂭	EZEN TIMES KASKAL SQUARED	
278	154			EZEN×GU_{4}			
279	154_1n			EZEN×Ú	U+120B3 𒂳	EZEN TIMES U2	
280	154a			EZEN×MIR			U+120A8 𒂨 EZEN TIMES DUN3 GUNU GUNU pertinent?
281	155			EZEN×SIG_{7}	U+120AB 𒂫	EZEN TIMES IGI GUNU	
282	152_9n		107	EZEN×ŠE			Hitt.
283	152_14			EZEN×UD	U+120B4 𒂴	EZEN TIMES UD	
284	152_16	156		EZEN×KUG	U+120AE 𒂮	EZEN TIMES KU3	
285	156	158		ASILAL (EZEN×LÁL)	U+120B0 𒂰	EZEN TIMES LAL TIMES LAL	
286	157			EZEN×LU	U+120B2 𒂲	EZEN TIMES LU	
287	162			EZEN×GÍN			U+120A7 𒂧 EZEN TIMES DUN3 GUNU pertinent?
288	158	159		ÀSILAL (EZEN×A)	U+120A2 𒂢	EZEN TIMES A	
289	159			SIL_{7} (EZEN× A.LAL)	U+120A3 𒂣	EZEN TIMES A PLUS LAL	
290	160			ASILAL_{4} (EZEN× A.LÁL)	U+120A4 𒂤	EZEN TIMES A PLUS LAL TIMES LAL	
291	161			EZENxḪA	U+120A9 𒂩	EZEN TIMES HA	
292	164	388	350	SUM	U+122E7 𒋧	SUM	
293	165	377	352; (345)	NAGA	U+12240 𒉀	NAGA	
293	165v			AN.NAGA.AN.NAGAinversum	U+12030 𒀰	AN PLUS NAGA OPPOSING AN PLUS NAGA	
293	165a			4×AN.NAGA forming a cross	U+12031 𒀱	AN PLUS NAGA SQUARED	
293	165n1			NAGAinversum	U+12241 𒉁	NAGA INVERTED	
293	165+165n1			NAGA. NAGAinversum	U+12243 𒉃	NAGA OPPOSING NAGA	
294	165b			NAGA×ŠU-tenû	U+12242 𒉂	NAGA TIMES SHU TENU	
295	131a		94	NIB (PIRIG×KAL)	U+1228B 𒊋	PIRIG TIMES KAL	
296	130	179	93	UG (PIRIG×UD)	U+1228C 𒊌	PIRIG TIMES UD	
297	131	180	92	AZ (PIRIG×ZA)	U+1228D 𒊍	PIRIG TIMES ZA	
298	167	141	164	GAB	U+12083 𒂃	DUH	
298	167	141	164	GAB	U+120EE 𒃮	GABA	
299	167a			GAB.LIŠ			see 839
300	168	115	(168)	EDIN	U+12094 𒂔	EDIN	also n499 báhar ("EDIN")
301	169	142	171	TAḪ/DAḪ (MUoverMU)	U+1222D 𒈭	MU OVER MU	
302	166	271	259	KASKAL	U+1219C 𒆜	KASKAL	
303	166a			ÌTI (KASKAL.ITI)	U+1219C 𒆜 & U+1231A 𒌚	KASKAL & UD TIMES U PLUS U PLUS U	
304	166b	273		ILLAT (KASKAL.KUR)	U+1219C 𒆜 & U+121B3 𒆳	KASKAL & KUR	
305	166+371	271		KASKAL.BU	U+1219C 𒆜 & U+1204D 𒁍	KASKAL & BU	
306	166+398			KASKAL.AḪ	U+1219C 𒆜 & U+12134 𒄴	KASKAL & HI TIMES NUN	
307	166e			KASKAL.LAGAB	U+1219C 𒆜 & U+121B8 𒆸	KASKAL & LAGAB	
307	166ee			KASKAL.TÚLoverTÚL	U+1219D 𒆝	KASKAL LAGAB TIMES U OVER LAGAB TIMES U	
307	166een			KASKALoverKASKAL.TÚLoverTÚL	U+1219E 𒆞	KASKAL OVER KASKAL LAGAB TIMES U OVER LAGAB TIMES U	
308	166f			ZIKURA (KASKAL.ÀŠ)	U+1219C 𒆜 & U+1240B 𒐋	KASKAL & NUMERIC SIGN SIX DISH	
309	170	119	168	AM (GU_{4}×KUR)	U+12120 𒄠	GUD TIMES KUR	
310	170an		203	AM×A	U+1211F 𒄟	GUD TIMES A PLUS KUR	reconstruction
311	171	134	203	UZU	U+1235C 𒍜	UZU	
312	173	117	172	BÍL (GIBIL; NE×PAB, NE-šeššig)	U+1224B 𒉋	NE SHESHIG	
313	172	116	169	NE	U+12248 𒉈	NE	
314	174			ÉMEŠ (NE×UD)	U+1224A 𒉊	NE TIMES UD	
315	175			ENTEN (NE×A)	U+12249 𒉉	NE TIMES A	
316	176	135	119	NÍNDA	U+12252 𒉒	NINDA2	
317	177			NÍNDA×AŠ	U+12254 𒉔	NINDA2 TIMES ASH	
318	177n			NÍNDA× AŠ.AŠ	U+12255 𒉕	NINDA2 TIMES ASH PLUS ASH	
319	178			NÍNDA×BAL	U+12391 𒎑	NINDA2 TIMES BAL	
320	178aa		103	ŠÀM (NÍNDA×AN)	U+12253 𒉓	NINDA2 TIMES AN	
321	179			NÍNDA×BÁN			
322	180			NÍNDA×GI	U+12392 𒎒	NINDA2 TIMES GI	
323	182			SUMAŠ	U+122E8 𒋨	SUMASH	
324	181v		104	AZU (NÍNDA×NUN)	U+12259 𒉙	NINDA2 TIMES NUN	
324	181v		104	AZU (NÍNDA×NUN)	U+1236B 𒍫	ZU5	
324	181n			AZU×A	U+1236C 𒍬	ZU5 TIMES A	reconstruction; cf. O.B.O. 160/I 282
325	182n			NÍNDA×DUB?			
326	183	136	121	ÁG (NÍNDA×NE)	U+12258 𒉘	NINDA2 TIMES NE	
327	184			NÍNDA×GU_{4}	U+12256 𒉖	NINDA2 TIMES GUD	
328	186			NÍNDA×ŠID?			
329	184a			NÍNDA×Ú			uncertain
330	185			NÍNDA× Ú.AŠ	U+1225E 𒉞	NINDA2 TIMES U2 PLUS ASH	
331	186a			NÍNDA× ŠE.AŠ	U+1225C 𒉜	NINDA2 TIMES SHE PLUS ASH	
332	186b			NÍNDA× ŠE.AŠ.AŠ	U+1225D 𒉝	NINDA2 TIMES SHE PLUS ASH PLUS ASH	
333	187	137	123	NÍNDA× ŠE.A.AN	important code point missing		
333	187v5			NÍNDA×ŠE	U+1225A 𒉚	NINDA2 TIMES SHE	
333	187v1			NÍNDA× ŠE.A .AN	U+1225B 𒉛	NINDA2 TIMES SHE PLUS A AN	
334	188			NÍNDA×U			
335	189			NÍNDA×MAN			
336	190	140		ZIG/ZIK (NÍNDA×EŠ)	U+12368 𒍨	ZIG	
337	190a			NÍNDA× ME.KÍD			
337	190an4			NÍNDA× ME.KÁR	U+12257 𒉗	NINDA2 TIMES ME PLUS GAN2 TENU	reconstruction
338	190kv	210 and 133		GALAM (SUKUD)	U+120F4 𒃴	GALAM	
339	191	138	120	KUM (GUM)	U+12123 𒄣	GUM	
340	192	139	122	GAZ (KUM×ŠE)	U+12124 𒄤	GUM TIMES SHE	
341	203	072	124	ÚR	U+1232B 𒌫	UR2	
342	204v	073		ÚR×NUN	U+12330 𒌰	UR2 TIMES NUN	
343	204n			ÚR×AL	U+1232E 𒌮	UR2 TIMES AL	
344	204a	074		ÚR×Ú	U+12331 𒌱	UR2 TIMES U2	
345	204b			ÚR× Ú.AŠ	U+12332 𒌲	UR2 TIMES U2 PLUS ASH	
346	204c			ÚR× A.ḪA	U+1232C 𒌬	UR2 TIMES A PLUS HA	
347	204d			ÚR×ḪA	U+1232F 𒌯	UR2 TIMES HA	
348	205	078	117	IL (AL×ŠE)	U+1214B 𒅋	IL	
349	205a			IL×KÁR	U+1214C 𒅌	IL TIMES GAN2 TENU	uncertain reconstruction
350	206	064, 197	128	DU	U+1207A 𒁺	DU	
350	206a			LAḪ_{4} (DUoverDU)	U+1207B 𒁻	DU OVER DU	
351	201	065		SUḪUŠ (DU-gunû)	U+1207C 𒁼	DU GUNU	
352	202	066	129	KAŠ_{4} (DU-šeššig)	U+1207D 𒁽	DU SHESHIG	
353	208	292	302	ANŠE (GÌR×PA or GÌR×"TAB")	U+12032 𒀲	ANSHE	
353	208	292	302	ANŠE (GÌR×PA or GÌR×"TAB")	U+1210F 𒄏	GIR3 TIMES PA	
354	207	075	125	TUM	U+12308 𒌈	TUM	
355	207a			TUM-gunû/TUM×KÁR			
356	209	076	126	EGIR	U+12095 𒂕	EGIR	
357	212	162	151	IŠ	U+12156 𒅖	ISH	
358	214	079	153	BI	U+12049 𒁉	BI	
359	214			EŠEMIN_{5} ("BI")	U+12459 𒑙	NUMERIC SIGN TWO ESHE3	
360	214a			BI×SIG_{7}	U+1204C 𒁌	BI TIMES IGI GUNU	reconstruction
361	214c			BI×GAR	U+1204B 𒁋	BI TIMES GAR	reconstruction
362	215	083	154	ŠIM	U+122C6 𒋆	SHIM	
363	217			ŠIM×BAL	U+122C8 𒋈	SHIM TIMES BAL	
364	217n			ŠIM×BÚR			uncertain
365	216			ŠIM×MUG	U+122D0 𒋐	SHIM TIMES MUG	
366	221			ŠIM×DIN	U+122CA 𒋊	SHIM TIMES DIN	
367	218			ŠIM×BULUG	U+122C9 𒋉	SHIM TIMES BULUG	
368	219x			ŠIM×SIG_{7}	U+122CD 𒋍	SHIM TIMES IGI GUNU	
369	219			ŠIM×LUL	U+122CF 𒋏	SHIM TIMES LUL	
370	219xx			ŠIM×PI			reconstruction
371	220			ŠIM×IGI	U+122CC 𒋌	SHIM TIMES IGI	
372	224			ŠIM×A (DUMGAL)	U+122C7 𒋇	SHIM TIMES A	
373	225	085	163	ŠIM×NÍG (BAPPIR)	U+122CB 𒋋	SHIM TIMES GAR	
374	222			ŠIM×MUNUS (ŠIM×SAL)	U+122D1 𒋑	SHIM TIMES SAL	
375	223			ŠIM×KÚŠU	U+122CE 𒋎	SHIM TIMES KUSHU2	
376	226	081		GISAL (BI.GIŠ)	U+12110 𒄐	GISAL	
377	227			BÁNŠUR	U+12143 𒅃	IDIM OVER IDIM BUR	
378	228	274	260	KIB			
378	105n3	274	260	GÁNoverGÁNcrossed	U+120FA 𒃺	GAN2 CROSSING GAN2	old sign, LAK 278
378	296n2	274	260	GIŠoverGIŠcrossed	U+12112 𒄒	GISH CROSSING GISH	old sign, LAK 276
379	230	260	75	GAG (KAK)	U+12195 𒆕	KAK	
380	231	261	72	NI	U+1224C 𒉌	NI	BE3, DIG, I3, IA3, LE2, LI2, LID2, NE2, ŠUŠ2, ZAL, ZAR2
380	231n2(v)		76	NI×E	U+1224D 𒉍	NI TIMES E	Hitt. esp. Hurr.
381	211	068	132	UŠ (NITA)	U+12351 𒍑	USH	
382	211n	069		UŠ×KÍD	U+12355 𒍕	USH TIMES TAK4	
383	211n2			UŠ×KU	U+12353 𒍓	USH TIMES KU	
384	211b	071		KÀŠ (UŠ×A)	U+12352 𒍒	USH TIMES A	
385	229n	262	73	NA_{4} (NI.UD)	U+1224C 𒉌 & U+12313 𒌓	NI & UD	
385	229n	262	73	NA_{4} (NI.UD)	U+1224C 𒉌 & U+1209F 𒂟	NI & ERIM	
386	229n			DÀG ("NA_{4}")	U+1224C 𒉌 & U+1209F 𒂟	NI & ERIM	
387	233	093	56	GÁ (MAL)	U+120B7 𒂷	GA2	
388	233_22	270		ŠITA ("GÁ")	U+122D6 𒋖	SHITA	
389	234			GÁ×AŠ	U+120BD 𒂽	GÁ×AŠ	
390	235			GÁ× ḪAL.LA	U+120D3 𒃓	GA2 TIMES HAL PLUS LA	
391	236			GÁ× GÍR.SU	U+120D0 𒃐	GA2 TIMES GIR2 PLUS SU	
392	237	094	57	AMA (GÁ×AN)	U+120BC 𒂼	GA2 TIMES AN	
393	238			GÁ× AN.GAG.A			
394	241	069		GÁ×KÍD	U+120E9 𒃩	GA2 TIMES TAK4	
395	242			GÁ×BAD	U+120BF 𒂿	GA2 TIMES BAD	
396	243			GÁ×GI	U+120CD 𒃍	GA2 TIMES GI	
397	244v	096		GANUN (GÁ×NUN)	U+120E0 𒃠	GA2 TIMES NUN	
398	245			GÁ×KAB	U+120D5 𒃕	GA2 TIMES HUB2	
399	247			GÁ×EN	U+120C9 𒃉	GA2 TIMES EN	
400	239			GÁ×BURU_{14}	U+120CA 𒃊	GA2 TIMES EN TIMES GAN2 TENU	
401	246			GÁ× MUN(DIM×ŠE, later DIM×KUR)	U+120C5 𒃅	GA2 TIMES DIM TIMES SHE	
402	248	098		GÁ×KÁR	U+120CB 𒃋	GA2 TIMES GAN2 TENU	
403	250			GÁ×DUB	U+120C6 𒃆	GA2 TIMES DUB	
404	250c			GÁ×SUM	U+120E8 𒃨	GA2 TIMES SUM	
405	250d			GÁ×KASKAL	U+120D9 𒃙	GA2 TIMES KASKAL	
406	250i			GÁ× IŠ.ḪU.AŠ	U+120D7 𒃗	GA2 TIMES ISH PLUS HU PLUS ASH	
407	251			GÁ×GAG	U+120D8 𒃘	GA2 TIMES KAK	
408	252	097	54	SILA_{4} (GÁ×PA)	U+120E2 𒃢	GA2 TIMES PA	
408	257			SILA_{4} also: GÁ×ÁŠ			transliteration only gazi
409	252_1			GÁ× KID.LAL	U+120DB 𒃛	GA2 TIMES KID PLUS LAL	
410	252_2			GÁ×ŠID	U+120E7 𒃧	GA2 TIMES SHID	
411	255	099	58	ÙR (GÁ×NIR)	U+120E1 𒃡	GA2 TIMES NUN OVER NUN	
412	256			GÁ×GI_{4}	U+120CE 𒃎	GA2 TIMES GI4	
413	250b			GÁ×SAR	U+120E4 𒃤	GA2 TIMES SAR	
414	258			GÁ× ÁŠ.GAL	U+120BE 𒂾	GA2 TIMES ASH2 PLUS GAL	
415	259			GÁ× BUR.RA	U+120C2 𒃂	GA2 TIMES BUR PLUS RA	
416	259n			GÁ×DA	U+120C3 𒃃	GA2 TIMES DA	
417	260			GÁ×SIG_{7}	U+120D6 𒃖	GA2 TIMES IGI GUNU	
418	261	100	59	ÉSAG (GÁ/É×ŠE)	U+120E5 𒃥	GA2 TIMES SHE	sub MesZL 495 only É.ŠE, esag_{x}
418	261	100	59	ÉSAG (GÁ/É×ŠE)	U+12092 𒂒	E2 TIMES SCHE(standard)	sub MesZL 495 only É.ŠE, esag_{x}
419	261a			GÁ× ŠE.TUR	U+120E6 𒃦	GA2 TIMES SHE PLUS TUR	
420	262			GÁ×UD	U+120EB 𒃫	GA2 TIMES UD	
421	263			GÁx ḪI.LI	U+120D4 𒃔	GA2 TIMES HI PLUS LI	
422	264			GÁ×U	U+120EA 𒃪	GA2 TIMES U	
423	264a			GÁ×ÁB			uncertain
424	265	101		ITIMA (GÁ/É×MI)	U+120DF 𒃟	GA2 TIMES MI(standard)	sub MesZL 495 only É.MI, itima_{x}
424	265	101		ITIMA (GÁ/É×MI)	U+12090 𒂐	E2 TIMES MI	sub MesZL 495 only É.MI, itima_{x}
425	268			GÁ×DI	U+120C4 𒃄	GA2 TIMES DI	
426	269			GÁ× KUG.AN	U+120DC 𒃜	GA2 TIMES KU3 PLUS AN	
427	270	102		MEN (GÁ× ME.EN)	U+120DE 𒃞	GA2 TIMES ME PLUS EN	
428	273			GÁ/É× A.DA.ḪA	U+120B8 𒂸	GA2 TIMES A PLUS DA PLUS HA	
428	273			GÁ/É× A.DA.ḪA	U+120BE 𒂎	E2 TIMES A PLUS HA PLUS DA(sic!)	
429	274			GÁ× A.IGI	U+120BA 𒂺	GA2 TIMES A PLUS IGI	to be deleted
430	277			GÁ× ḪA.LU.ŠÈ	U+120D1 𒃑	GA2 TIMES HA PLUS LU PLUS ESH2	
431	278	105	60	GALGA (GÁ/É×NÍG)	U+120CC 𒃌	GA2 TIMES GAR	
431	278	105	60	GALGA (GÁ/É×NÍG)	U+1208F 𒂏	E2 TIMES GAR	
432	271	104		ARḪUŠ (GÁ/É×MUNUS)	U+120E3 𒃣	GA2 TIMES SAL	standard: É×MUNUS
432	271	104		ARḪUŠ (GÁ/É×MUNUS)	U+12091 𒂑	E2 TIMES SAL	standard: É×MUNUS
433	272			GÁ× EL.LA	U+120C8 𒃈	GA2 TIMES EL PLUS LA	
434	233_40; 230x	460		ŠÍTA ("GÁ.GIŠ")	U+122D6 𒋖 & U+12111 𒄑	SHITA & GISH	
435	249	161	228	KISAL	U+121A6 𒆦	KISAL	
436	249			NI+GIŠ			ligature ì+giš
437	232	263	77	IR (GAG-gunû)	U+12155 𒅕	IR	
438	280	168	243	DAG (PÀR)	U+12056 𒁖	DAG	
439	281			DAG.KISIM_{5}			uncertain
440	281a; 294e; 432_1	172		KIŠI_{8} (DAG.KISIM_{5}×GÍR(-gunû?))	U+1205E 𒁞	DAG KISIM5 TIMES GIR2	
441	282			DAG.KISIM_{5}×LA	U+12064 𒁤	DAG KISIM5 TIMES LA	
442	282a			DAG.KISIM_{5}×MUNU_{4}	U+12069 𒁩	DAG KISIM5 TIMES PAP PLUS PAP	
443	283			DAG.KISIM_{5}×KÍD	U+1206B 𒁫	DAG KISIM5 TIMES TAK4	
444	284			DAG.KISIM_{5}×GI	U+1205D 𒁝	DAG KISIM5 TIMES GI	
445	285			DAG.KISIM_{5}×SI	U+1206A 𒁪	DAG KISIM5 TIMES SI	
446	286			DAG.KISIM_{5}×NE	U+12068 𒁨	DAG KISIM5 TIMES NE	
447	288			DAG.KISIM_{5}×BI	U+1205A 𒁚	DAG KISIM5 TIMES BI	
448	288a; 294f			DAG.KISIM_{5}×GAG	U+12063 𒁣	DAG KISIM5 TIMES KAK	
449	287			UTUA (DAG.KISIM_{5}×UŠ)	U+1206D 𒁭	DAG KISIM5 TIMES USH	
450	288b			ÙBUR (DAG.KISIM_{5}×"IR")	U+12061 𒁡	DAG KISIM5 TIMES IR	
451	288c			UBUR_{4} (DAG.KISIM_{5}× "IR".LU)	U+12062 𒁢	DAG KISIM5 TIMES IR PLUS LU	
452	289		188	UTUL_{5} (DAG.KISIM_{5}×GU_{4})	U+1205F 𒁟	DAG KISIM5 TIMES GUD	
453	290	170		KIŠI_{9} (DAG.KISIM_{5}× Ú.GÍR(-gunû?))	U+1206C 𒁬	DAG KISIM5 TIMES U2 PLUS GIR2	
454	290n		283	DAG.KISIM_{5}× Ú.MAŠ/BAR			Hitt.
455	291	171	189	UBUR (DAG.KISIM_{5}×GA)	U+1205B 𒁛	DAG KISIM5 TIMES GA	
456	294c			DAG.KISIM_{5}×DÉ or			uncertain
456	294cn			DAG.KISIM_{5}×MÚRU ?			uncertain
457	292			DAG.KISIM_{5}×DÚB/BALAG	U+12059 𒁙	DAG KISIM5 TIMES BALAG	
458	288sub			DAG.KISIM_{5}×AMAR	U+12058 𒁘	DAG KISIM5 TIMES AMAR	
459	292a	173		ÚBUR (DAG.KISIM_{5}×LU)	U+12065 𒁥	DAG KISIM5 TIMES LU	
460	293	174		AMAŠ (DAG.KISIM_{5}× LU.MÁŠ)	U+12066 𒁦	DAG KISIM5 TIMES LU PLUS MASH2	
461	294b		190; 285	DAG.KISIM_{5}×A.MAŠ	U+12057 𒁗	DAG KISIM5 TIMES A PLUS MASH	
462	294d			DAG.KISIM_{5}×ḪA	U+12060 𒁠	DAG KISIM5 TIMES HA	
463	294a			DAG.KISIM_{5}×LUM	U+12067 𒁧	DAG KISIM5 TIMES LUM	
464	295	143	174	PA	U+1227A 𒉺	PA	
465	295	143		BANMIN ("PA")	U+12450 𒑐	NUMERIC SIGN TWO BAN2	
466	295k		175	ŠAB (PA.IB)	U+1227A 𒉺 & U+12141 𒅁	PA & IB	
467	295l			NUSKA (PA.TÚG)	U+1227A 𒉺 & U+12306 𒌆	PA & TUG2	
468	295m		177	SIPA (PA.LU)	U+1227A 𒉺 & U+121FB 𒇻	PA & LU	
469	296	160	178	GIŠ (GEŠ)	U+12111 𒄑	GISH	
470	296_1			GIŠ-tenû	U+12115 𒄕	GISH TENU	
471	296_2			GIŠ×BAD	U+12113 𒄓	GISH TIMES BAD	
472	297	118	157	GU_{4}	U+1211E 𒄞	GUD	
473	297a			GU_{4}×KASKAL			reconstruction
474	298	108	183	AL	U+12020 𒀠	AL	
475	299			AL×KÍD			see MesZL n475
475	299n			AL×KÀD	U+12025 𒀥	AL TIMES KAD3	see MesZL n475
476	300			AL×UŠ	U+12028 𒀨	AL TIMES USH	
477	301			AL×GIŠ	U+12023 𒀣	AL TIMES GISH	
478	301n			AL×AL	U+12021 𒀡	AL TIMES AL	
479	304			AL×ŠE	U+12027 𒀧	AL TIMES SHE	
480	302			AL×GIM	U+12022 𒀢	AL TIMES DIM2	
481	303			AL×KI	U+12026 𒀦	AL TIMES KI	
482	305			AL×ḪA	U+12024 𒀤	AL TIMES HA	
483	307	144	191	MAR	U+12225 𒈥	MAR	
484	313	163	194	KID (LÍL)	U+121A4 𒆤	KID	
485	314	212; 207a	231	ŠID (LAG)	U+122C3 𒋃	SHID	
485	337xx			SAG_{5}	U+12260 𒉠	NISAG	old sign, = n546
486	314	112a	112	MES (RID)	U+12229 𒈩	MES	
487	317a			ŠID×IM	U+122C5 𒋅	SHID TIMES IM	
488	315			MES/UM×ME	U+12398 𒎘	UM TIMES ME	
489	317	208		ÚMBISAG (ŠID×A)	U+122C4 𒋄	SHID TIMES A	
490	318	146	195	Ú	U+12311 𒌑	U2	
491	319	201	159	GA	U+120B5 𒂵	GA	KA3
492	319n	202		GA-gunû	U+120B6 𒂶	GA GUNU	old sign
493	320	204	161	ÍL (GA.GÍN)	U+1214D 𒅍	IL2	GUR3, GURU3, DUPSIK
494	321	196	198	LUḪ	U+1221B 𒈛	LUH	
495	324	107	199	É	U+1208D 𒂍	E2	
496	322	176	196	KAL	U+12197 𒆗	KAL	
496	322	176	196	KAL	U+12128 𒄨	GURUSH	
496	322n			KALoverKALcrossed	U+12199 𒆙	KAL CROSSING KAL	
497	323		(40)	ALAD (KAL×BAD)	U+12198 𒆘	KAL TIMES BAD	
498	308	167	187	E	U+1208A 𒂊	E	E "barley", "leather", EKI, EG2 "levee", IG2, I15
498	308n			EoverE.NUNoverNUN	U+1208C 𒂌	E OVER E NUN OVER NUN	
499	309	080	162	DUG (BI×A)	U+12081 𒂁	DUG	
499	309	080	162	DUG (BI×A)	U+1204A 𒁊	BI TIMES A	
500	312	169		KALAM			U+12326 𒌦, erroneously UN
501	312	169	197	UN			U+12327 𒌧, erroneously UN GUNU
502	325	148	204	NIR (NUNoverNUN)	U+1226A 𒉪	NUN OVER NUN	
503	310	145	193	GURUN	U+12127 𒄧	GURUN	
504	306	288	152	UB	U+12312 𒌒	UB	

== EŠ_{16} (three AŠ) ==
MesZL	ŠL/HA	aBZL	HethZL	Sign Name	Unicode code point	Unicode Name	Comments
505	325a			EŠ_{16} (AŠoverAŠoverAŠ)	U+1203C 𒀼	ASH OVER ASH OVER ASH	
505	325a			EŠ_{16} (AŠoverAŠoverAŠ)	U+1243A 𒐺	NUMERIC SIGN THREE VARIANT FORM ESH16	"3"
506	325b			LIMMU_{4}	U+1243D 𒐽	NUMERIC SIGN FOUR VARIANT FORM LIMMU4	"4"
507	326	214	234	GI_{4} (GI-gunû)	U+12104 𒄄	GI4	
508	326a			GIGI (GI_{4}overGI_{4}crossed)	U+12106 𒄆	GI4 CROSSING GI4	
508	326v			GIGI (GI_{4}overGI_{4})	U+12105 𒄅	GI4 OVER GI4	
509	327			ÚSAN (GÚ-gunû)	U+1211D 𒄝	GU2 GUNU	
510	327x			ÚSAN.GAG	U+1211D 𒄝 & U+12195 𒆕	GU2 GUNU & KAK	
511	328	192	233	RA	U+1228F 𒊏	RA	
512	329	331		DÙL (SAG-gunû)	U+122A8 𒊨	SAG GUNU	
513	329a			IA_{9} (EŠ_{16}.TAB)	U+1203C 𒀼 & U+122F0 𒋰	CUNEIFORM SIGN ASH OVER ASH OVER ASH & TAB	sign form congruent with U+1213F 𒄿
513	329a			IA_{9} (EŠ_{16}.TAB)	U+1243A 𒐺 & U+122F0 𒋰	CUNEIFORM NUMERIC SIGN THREE VARIANT FORM ESH16 & TAB	sign form congruent with U+1213F 𒄿
514	330	253	78	LÚ	U+121FD 𒇽	LU2	
514	330_60v			LÚoverLÚcrossed	U+12212 𒈒	LU2 CROSSING LU2	
514	330_60	255		LÚ.LÚinversum	U+12213 𒈓	LU2 OPPOSING LU2	
514	330_60n2			4×LÚ forming a cross	U+12214 𒈔	LU2 SQUARED	
515	330_0			LÚ-tenû	U+12211 𒈑	LU2 TENU	
516, 534	330_8n			LÚ-šeššig ("LÚ.GAM")	U+12215 𒈕	LU2 SHESHIG	
517	330_6	256		LÚ×BAD	U+121FF 𒇿	LU2 TIMES BAD	
518	330_9n			LÚ-šeššig×BAD ("LÚ×BAD .GAM")			reconstruction
519	330_0n			LÚ×KÁD	U+12205 𒈅	LU2 TIMES KAD2	
520	330_4			LÚ×KÍD or			
520	330_4n			LÚ×KÀD ?	U+12206 𒈆	LU2 TIMES KAD3	
521	330_7	258		LÚ× KÁR(GÁN-tenû)	U+12202 𒈂	LU2 TIMES GAN2 TENU	
522	330_7a	257		LÚ×NE	U+1220C 𒈌	LU2 TIMES NE	
523	330_7an1			LÚ×AL	U+121FE 𒇾	LU2 TIMES AL	
524	330_7cv			LÚ×ŠU			
525	330_7an3v			LÚ×KAM*	U+12203 𒈃	LU2 TIMES HI TIMES BAD	see MesZL n514
526	330_7an2			LÚ×IM	U+12204 𒈄	LU2 TIMES IM	
527	330_7an4			LÚ×KI	U+12208 𒈈	LU2 TIMES KI	
527'	330_7bn			LÚ× ME.EN	U+1220B 𒈋	LU2 TIMES ME PLUS EN	
528	330_7b			LÚ×LAGAB	U+1220A 𒈊	LU2 TIMES LAGAB	
529	330_7c			LÚ×KU or similar			
530	330_7c			LÚ×TÚG	U+12210 𒈐	LU2 TIMES TUG2	
530	330_7c	259		LÚ×ŠÈ	U+12200 𒈀	LU2 TIMES ESH2	see MesZL 514, 175
531	330_7cn			LÚ×ŠÈ-tenû	U+12201 𒈁	LU2 TIMES ESH2 TENU	
532	330_7d			LÚ× ŠÈ.LAL			
533	330_7dn			LÚ× SÍG.BU	U+1220F 𒈏	LU2 TIMES SIK2 PLUS BU	
534	see n516						
535	331	021b	79	ŠEŠ (ÙRI)	U+122C0 𒋀	SHESH	
535	331	021a	79	ŠEŠ (ÙRI)	U+12336 𒌶	URI3	
536	331a			AŠ_{9} (EŠ_{16}.EŠ_{16})	U+12440 𒑀	NUMERIC SIGN SIX VARIANT FORM ASH9	"6"
537	331b			ÌMIN (EŠ_{16}.EŠ_{16}.AŠ)	U+12441 𒑁	NUMERIC SIGN SEVEN VARIANT FORM IMIN3	"7"
538	331c			ÙSSU (EŠ_{16}.EŠ_{16}.TAB)	U+12445 𒑅	NUMERIC SIGN EIGHT VARIANT FORM USSU3	"8"
539	331d			ÌLIMMU (EŠ_{16}.EŠ_{16}.EŠ_{16})	U+12447 𒑇	NUMERIC SIGN NINE VARIANT FORM ILIMMU3	"9"
540	332	206	238	ZAG	U+12360 𒍠	ZAG	
541	331e, 152iv	385	353	SAR	U+122AC 𒊬	SAR	
542	337xn1	see 205b		UD-gunû	U+12319 𒌙	UD GUNU	uncertain reconstruction
543	333	209	240	GÀR (QAR)	U+120FC 𒃼	GAR3	
544	336	091	127	LIL	U+121F8 𒇸	LIL	see also MesZL p62 n87c
545	337	207a/207b	110	MÚRU (MURUB_{4}, NISAG; ITI-gunû)	U+12318 𒌘	UD TIMES U PLUS U PLUS U GUNU	
546	337xx	207a		SAG_{5}	U+12260 𒉠	NISAG (read NISAG2)	merged with ŠID; see MesZL n485
547	338	215	102	DÉ (SIMUG)	U+12323 𒌣	UMUM	umum: value not accepted in MesZL. simug, umun_{2}
547	338n1			DÉ×KASKAL	U+12324 𒌤	UMUM TIMES KASKAL	abzu_{x}, de_{2}
547	338n2			DÉ×PA	U+12325 𒌥	UMUM TIMES PA	reconstruction
548	339	211	241	ÁŠ (ZÍZ)	U+1203E 𒀾	ASH2	
548	339	211	241	ÁŠ (ZÍZ)	U+12369 𒍩	ZIZ2	
549	339			BANEŠ ("ÁŠ")	U+12451 𒑑	NUMERIC SIGN THREE BAN2	
550	340v			BANLIMMU ("ÁŠ.U/GE_{23}")	U+12452 𒑒	NUMERIC SIGN FOUR BAN2	
550	340			BANLIMMU ("ÁŠ.U/GE_{23}")	U+12453 𒑓	NUMERIC SIGN FOUR BAN2 VARIANT FORM	
551	341v			BANIA ("ÁŠ. UoverU/GE_{23}overGE_{23}")	U+12454 𒑔	NUMERIC SIGN FIVE BAN2	
551	341			BANIA ("ÁŠ. UoverU/GE_{23}overGE_{23}")	U+12455 𒑕	NUMERIC SIGN FIVE BAN2 VARIANT FORM	
552	342	166	208	MA	U+12220 𒈠	MA	
553	343	213	242	GAL	U+120F2 𒃲	GAL	
553	343+091			GAL.KINDA	U+120F3 𒃳	GAL GAD OVER GAD GAR OVER GAR	
554	344	217	235	BÁRA	U+12048 𒁈	BARA2	cultic/political place. However, if the pattern is "ME fit for Official A", it would mean "ruler". ruler
555	345	216	220; 221	GÚG (LÙ; ŠÈ-gunû)	U+12216 𒈖	LU3	
556	347	219b, 219a	96	GÍN	U+12086 𒂆	DUN3 GUNU	Unicode names pertinent?
556	347	219b, 219a	96	MIR (NIMGIR)	U+12087 𒂇	DUN3 GUNU GUNU	Unicode names pertinent?
557	348	220	88	DUN_{4} (UR-gunû-šeššig/MIR-šeššig)	U+12088 𒂈	DUN4	
558	346	222	244A	GIR (ḪA-gunû)	U+1212B 𒄫	HA GUNU	
559	349	223	245	BUR (NÍG-gunû)	U+12053 𒁓	BUR	
560	334	230	215	Á	U+12009 𒀉	A2	
561	335	229	214	DA	U+12055 𒁕	DA	
562	350		336	GAŠAN	U+120FD 𒃽	GASHAN	
563	350_8		336	U-gunû/BÙR-gunû	U+12434 𒐴	NUMERIC SIGN ONE BURU	
564	351	198	239	SIG_{7} (IGI-gunû)	U+1214A 𒅊	IGI GUNU	"10,000"
565	352	082		DÚB (BALAG)	U+12080 𒂀	DUB2	
565	352	195	225	DÚB (BALAG)	U+12046 𒁆	BALAG	
566	353	203	158	ŠA	U+122AD 𒊭	SHA	
567	354	225	68	ŠU	U+122D7 𒋗	SHU	
568	354b	227a	68	KAD_{4}	U+12192 𒆒	KAD4	
569	354bv	227b		KAD_{5}	U+12193 𒆓	KAD5	
570	355	296	19; 351	LUL (NAR)	U+1221C 𒈜	LUL	
571	356	228	70	SA_{6}	U+122B7 𒊷	SHA6 (bad!)	
572	357			BÌŠEBA (GU_{4}overGU_{4}.LUGAL)	U+12121 𒄡	GUD OVER GUD LUGAL	
573	358	199	226	ALAM (GU_{4}overGU_{4}.NA)	U+12029 𒀩	ALAN	
574	359n1	224	246	URI (BURoverBUR)	U+12335 𒌵	URI	

== GE_{23} (DIŠ-tenû) ==
MesZL	ŠL/HA	aBZL	HethZL	Sign Name	Unicode code point	Unicode Name	Comments
575	360			GE_{23} (DIŠ-tenû)	U+12039 𒀹	ASH ZIDA TENU	cf. n647
576	362	359	247	GAM	U+120F5 𒃵	GAM	
576	362	359	247	GAM	U+12472 𒑲	PUNCTUATION SIGN DIAGONAL COLON	
577	363			ILIMMU_{4} (3×GE_{23})	U+12448 𒑈	NUMERIC SIGN VARIANT FORM ILIMMU4	"9"
577	363			ILIMMU_{4} (3×GE_{23})	U+12473 𒑳	PUNCTUATION SIGN DIAGONAL TRICOLON	
578	366	369	329	KUR	U+121B3 𒆳	KUR	
578	366_87			KUR.KURinversum	U+121B4 𒆴	KUR OPPOSING KUR	
579	367	378	338	ŠE	U+122BA 𒊺	SHE	
580	371	265	339	BU (GÍD)	U+1204D 𒁍	BU	
581	371n3			BUoverBUcrossed	U+12050 𒁐	BU CROSSING BU	
582	371a	275		SIRSIR (BUoverBU +AB)	U+1204E 𒁎	BU OVER BU AB	
583	372	379	340	UZ (US)	U+122BB 𒊻	SHE HU	
584	373	266	341	SUD (BU-gunû)	U+122E4 𒋤	SUD	
585	374	267	342	MUŠ	U+12232 𒈲	MUSH	
585	060a			UTUKI (KÚR.IR.GÍDIM)	U+12359 𒍙	UTUKI	see n92
586	374_81	276		RI_{8} (MUŠoverMUŠ parallel or crossed)	U+12236 𒈶	MUSH OVER MUSH	
586	374_81	276		RI_{8} (MUŠoverMUŠ parallel or crossed)	U+12238 𒈸	MUSH CROSSING MUSH	
586	374_81n1			RI_{8} (MUŠoverMUŠ× A.NA)	U+12237 𒈷	MUSH OVER MUSH TIMES A PLUS NA	
587	375	380	344	TIR	U+12301 𒌁	TIR	
587	375_45			NINNI_{5} (TIRoverTIR)	U+12303 𒌃	TIR OVER TIR	
588	375_46			TIRoverTIR.GADoverGAD.NÍGoverNÍG	U+12304 𒌄	TIR OVER TIR GAD OVER GAD GAR OVER GAR	
588	369			ŠEoverŠE.GADoverGAD.NÍGoverNÍG	U+122BC 𒊼	SHE OVER SHE GAD OVER GAD GAR OVER GAR	
588	370	389		ŠEoverŠE.TABoverTAB.NÍGoverNÍG	U+122BD 𒊽	SHE OVER SHE TAB OVER TAB GAR OVER GAR	
588	411_167a			UoverU.SURoverSUR	U+1230F 𒌏	U OVER U SUR OVER SUR	
588	411_182a			UoverU.PAoverPA.NÍGoverNÍG	U+1230E 𒌎	U OVER U PA OVER PA GAR OVER GAR	
589	376	289	249	TE	U+122FC 𒋼	TE	TEMEN, TEN, MUL2, TEĜ3
590	376x	290	250	KAR (TE.A)	U+122FC 𒋼 & U+12000 𒀀	TE & A	
591	377	232	286	LIŠ	U+121FA 𒇺	LISH	
592	377n1		248	:(division sign)	U+12471 𒑱	PUNCTUATION SIGN VERTICAL COLON	Glossenkeil
593	124n2			TAB variant old	U+1244A 𒑊	TWO ASH TENU	see MesZL n593, n209
594	378an			Number 1/4(Kültepe)	U+12462 𒑢	OLD ASSYRIAN ONE QUARTER	"1/4"
595	406v2			KAM (ḪI×BAD), variant form	U+1219A 𒆚	KAM2 (wrong!)	see MesZL n640
596	381	332	316	UD (BABBAR)	U+12313 𒌓	UD	
597	382v			ÍTIMA (UD×MI)	U+12316 𒌖	UD TIMES MI	
598	383	370	317	PI	U+1227F 𒉿	PI	
598	383a			PIoverPIcrossed/TALTAL	U+12289 𒊉	PI CROSSING PI	
598	383n2(v)		318	PI×AB	U+12281 𒊁	PI TIMES AB	Hitt. esp. Hurr.
598	383n3(v)		319	PI×I	U+12285 𒊅	PI TIMES I	Hitt. esp. Hurr.
598	383n4(v)		320	PI×BI	U+12282 𒊂	PI TIMES BI	Hitt. esp. Hurr.
598	383n6(v)		321	PI×Ú	U+12289 𒊈	PI TIMES U2	Hitt. esp. Hurr.
598	383n5(v)		322	PI×E	U+12284 𒊄	PI TIMES E	Hitt. esp. Hurr.
598	383n7(v)		324	PI×BU	U+12283 𒊃	PI TIMES BU	Hitt. esp. Hurr.
598	383n8(v)		323	PI×U	U+12287 𒊇	PI TIMES U	Hitt. esp. Hurr.
598	383n9(v)		325	PI×IB	U+12286 𒊆	PI TIMES IB	Hitt. esp. Hurr.
598	383n10(v)		326	PI×A	U+12280 𒊀	PI TIMES A	Hitt. esp. Hurr.
599	384	433	294	ŠÀ (ŠAG_{4})	U+122AE 𒊮	SHA3	
600	384n			ŠÀ×BAD	U+122B0 𒊰	SHA3 TIMES BAD	
601	384a	435		ŠÀ×TUR	U+122B4 𒊴	SHA3 TIMES TUR	
602	385	434		ŠÀ×NE	U+122B2 𒊲	SHA3 TIMES NE	
603	385n			ŠÀ×GIŠ	U+122B1 𒊱	SHA3 TIMES GISH	
604	386			ŠÀ×UD			
605	386n			ŠÀ×U	U+122B5 𒊵	SHA3 TIMES U	
606	388			BIR_{6} (ŠÀ× U.A)	U+122B6 𒊶	SHA3 TIMES U PLUS A	
607	387			ŠÀ×MI			
608	390	436		PEŠ_{4} (ŠÀ×A)	U+122AF 𒊯	SHA3 TIMES A	
609	389			ŠÀ×ŠÚ	U+122B3 𒊳	SHA3 TIMES SHU2	
610	391	463		UD.MUNUS.ḪÚB	U+12313 𒌓 & U+122A9 𒊩 & U+12138 𒄸	UD & SAL & HUB2	
611	392	333		ÚḪ (UD.KÚŠU)	U+12314 𒌔	UD KUSHU2	
612	393	247	327	ERIM (ZÁLAG)	U+1209F 𒂟	ERIN2	
613	393		327	PÍR	use U+1209F 𒂟 ERIN2		
614	394	371	328	NUNUZ	U+1226D 𒉭	NUNUZ	
615	394+420			NUNUZ.ÁB			
615	394a			NUNUZ.KISIM_{5}			
616	394b	372		LAḪTAN (NUNUZ.ÁB/KISIM_{5}×LA)	U+12274 𒉴	NUNUZ AB2 TIMES LA	
617	394bx			LÁḪTAN (NUNUZ.ÁB/KISIM_{5}×SÌLA)	U+12276 𒉶	NUNUZ AB2 TIMES SILA3	
618	394bxn			NUNUZ.ÁB/KISIM_{5}×KÀD	U+12273 𒉳	NUNUZ AB2 TIMES KAD3	
619	394c,394e	373		ÙSAN (NUNUZ.ÁB/KISIM_{5}×AŠGAB)	U+1226E 𒉮	NUNUZ AB2 TIMES ASHGAB	
620	394cxxx			NUNUZ.ÁB/KISIM_{5}×NE	U+12275 𒉵	NUNUZ AB2 TIMES NE	
621	394d			MÙD (NUNUZ.ÁB/KISIM_{5}×BI)	U+1226F 𒉯	NUNUZ AB2 TIMES BI	
621	394d			MÙD (NUNUZ.ÁB/KISIM_{5}×BI)	U+12278 𒉸	NUNUZ KISIM5 TIMES BI	
622	394d+411			NUNUZ.ÁB/KISIM_{5}×BI .U (MÙD.U)	U+12279 𒉹	NUNUZ KISIM5 TIMES BI U	
623	394dn2			NUNUZ.ÁB/KISIM_{5}×GU_{4}	U+12271 𒉱	NUNUZ AB2 TIMES GUD	
624	394dx			NUNUZ.ÁB/KISIM_{5}× Ú.BA			U+12277 𒉷 read NUNUZ AB2 TIMES U2 PLUS BA, not ... TIMES U2
625	394dn			NUNUZ.ÁB/KISIM_{5}×DUG	U+12270 𒉰	NUNUZ AB2 TIMES DUG	
626	394cx			NUNUZ.ÁB/KISIM_{5}× GÚG.BÙLUG			
626	394cxv			NUNUZ.ÁB/KISIM_{5}× BÙLUG.GÚG			
627	394en			NUNUZ.ÁB/KISIM_{5}×SIG_{7}	U+12272 𒉲	NUNUZ AB2 TIMES IGI GUNU	
628	395			ZIB	U+12366 𒍦	ZIB	
628	395v			ZIBinversum	U+12367 𒍧	ZIB KABA TENU	see Gong 39 and 220, omitted in MesZL
629	325an			EŠ_{23}	U+1244B 𒑋	NUMERIC SIGN THREE ASH TENU	"3", see MesZL n629, n505
630	395an			Number 1/6(Kültepe)	U+12461 𒑡	NUMERIC SIGN OLD ASSYRIAN ONE SIXTH	"1/6"
631	396	277	335	ḪI (DÙG)	U+1212D 𒄭	HI	
632	396	277	335	ŠAR	U+122B9 𒊹	SHAR2	
633	396		335	TÍ	U+12397 𒎗	SIGN TI2	only Assyrian
634	405v2	278		SÙR (ḪI.AŠ, ḪI×AŠ)	U+1212E 𒄮	HI TIMES ASH	
635	397		332	A'	U+1202A 𒀪	ALEPH	late variant of n636
636	398	280	332	AḪ (ḪI×NUN)	U+12134 𒄴	HI TIMES NUN	
637	398+166			AḪ.KASKAL	U+12134 𒄴 & U+1219C 𒆜	HI TIMES NUN & KASKAL	
638	398_64	282		AḪ.ME	U+12134 𒄴 & U+12228 𒈨	HI TIMES NUN & ME	
639	398_72			AḪ.ME.U	U+12134 𒄴 & U+12228 𒈨 & U+1230B 𒌋	HI TIMES NUN & ME & U	
640	406v1	279	355	KAM (ḪI.BAD)			n595 KAM (ḪI×BAD) U+12130 𒄰
641	399	297	337	IM	U+1214E 𒅎	IM	
641	399	297	337	IM	U+1224E 𒉎	NI2	
641	399xn			IMoverIMcrossed	U+12150 𒅐	IM CROSSING IM	
641	399xx			4×IM forming a cross	U+12152 𒅒	IM SQUARED	
642	399_51			IM×KÍD	U+1214F 𒅏	IM TIMES TAK4	IM.KÍD, IM×KÍD to n641
643	400	287	334	BIR (ḪI×ŠE)	U+12135 𒄵	HI TIMES SHE	
644	401	281	333	ḪAR (ḪI×ÁŠ)	U+1212F 𒄯	HI TIMES ASH2	
645	402	294		ḪUŠ (ḪI×GÌR)	U+1237D 𒍽	SIGN HUSH	
646	403	384	349	SUḪUR	U+122E6 𒋦	SUHUR	
647	361			GE_{22}	U+1237B 𒍻	GE22	
647	361n				U+1203A 𒀺	ASH KABA TENU	
648	364			ZUBUR			Unicode reference glyph form based on CAD Z 6b, not accepted in MSL 14 256f.
648	364n				U+1236D 𒍭	ZUBUR	Unicode reference glyph form based on CAD Z 6b, not accepted in MSL 14 256f.
649	365			ŠÚŠUR	U+1203D 𒀽	ASH OVER ASH OVER ASH CROSSING ASH OVER ASH OVER ASH	
650	407			ŠÁR×GAD	U+12132 𒄲	HI TIMES GAD	
651	408			ŠÁR× GAL.DIŠ	U+12432 𒐲	NUMERIC SIGN SHAR2 TIMES GAL PLUS DISH	"216.000"
652	408v			ŠÁR× GAL.MIN	U+12433 𒐳	NUMERIC SIGN SHAR2 TIMES GAL PLUS MIN	"432.000"
653	409	284		ŠÁR×U	U+1242C 𒐬	NUMERIC SIGN ONE SHARU	"36.000", DÚBUR (ḪI×U) see n688
654	409v2			ŠÁR×U-gunû			variant form of n653, "36.000"
655	409a	285		ŠÁR×MAN	U+1242D 𒐭	NUMERIC SIGN TWO SHARU	"72.000"
656	409b	286		ŠÁR×EŠ	U+1242E 𒐮	NUMERIC SIGN THREE SHARU	"108.000"
656	409b	286		ŠÁR×EŠ	U+1242F 𒐯	NUMERIC SIGN THREE SHARU VARIANT FORM	"108.000"
657	409c			ŠÁR×NIMIN	U+12430 𒐰	NUMERIC SIGN FOUR SHARU (variant form)	"144.000"
658	409d			ŠÁR×NINNU	U+12431 𒐱	NUMERIC SIGN FIVE SHARU (variant form)	"180.000"
659	409e			ŠÁR×DIŠ, also ḪI×DIŠ?	U+12131 𒄱	HI TIMES DISH	"216.000"
660	410			ḪI×KIN	U+12133 𒄳	HI TIMES KIN	

== U ==
MesZL	ŠL/HA	aBZL	HethZL	Sign Name	Unicode code point	Unicode Name	Comments
661	411	337	261	U/BÙR	U+1230B 𒌋	U	"10"
662	350_8		261	Ugunû, BÙR-gunû	U+12434 𒐴	NUMERIC SIGN ONE BURU	
663	412	358	272	UGU (U.KA)	U+1230B 𒌋 & U+12157 𒅗	U & KA	
664	414			U.ITI			reconstruction, delete?
665	415	340	264	UDUN (U.MU)	U+1230B 𒌋 & U+1222C 𒈬	U & MU	
666	413	341		ŠIBIR (U.BURU_{14})	U+1230B 𒌋 & U+12098 𒂘	U & EN TIMES GAN2	
667	415a	338		GÀKKUL (U.DIM)	U+1230B 𒌋 & U+12074 𒁴	U & DIM	
668	416, 416v	339		GAKKUL (U.DIM×ŠE), later U.DIM×KUR	U+1230B 𒌋 & U+12075 𒁵	U & DIM TIMES SHE	
669	417			U.GUR	U+1230B 𒌋 & U+12125 𒄥	U & GUR	
670	418		263	U.DAR (AŠDAR)	U+1230B 𒌋 & U+1206F 𒁯	U & DAR	
671	419	357		SAGŠU (U.SAG)	U+1230B 𒌋 & U+12295 𒊕	U & SAG	
672	420	352	277	ÁB	U+12016 𒀖	AB2	
673	420_8			ÁB×KÍD	U+1201B 𒀛	AB2 TIMES TAK4	
674	423	354		ÁB×KÁR	U+12018 𒀘	AB2 TIMES GAN2 TENU	
675	423	293		GIRI_{16} (GÌR×KÁR)	U+1210C 𒄌	GIR3 TIMES GAN2 TENU	
676	422			LILIZ (ÁB×BALAG)	U+12017 𒀗	AB2 TIMES BALAG	
677	424	353		LIBIŠ (ÁB×ŠÀ)	U+1201A 𒀚	AB2 TIMES SHA3	
678	425	291a	273	KIŠ	U+121A7 𒆧	KISH	
679	426			MEZE (ÁB× ME.EN)	U+12019 𒀙	AB2 TIMES ME PLUS EN	
680	426a		284	ÁB×A	U+12371 𒍱	AB2 TIMES A	Hitt.
681	427	348	267	MI	U+1222A 𒈪	MI	
682	429	343	271	GUL (SÚN)	U+12122 𒄢	GUL	
683	430	342	266	GIR_{4} (U.AD)	U+1230B 𒌋 & U+1201C 𒀜	U & AD	
684	428	345	270	ŠAGAN (U.GAN/ŠU_{4}.GAN)	U+1230B 𒌋 & U+120F6 𒃶	U & GAN	
685	439	027	118	PAN	U+1227C 𒉼	PAN	
686	440	067	165	GIM (DÍM)	U+12076 𒁶	DIM2	
687	396n3			KISIM_{5}	U+121A8 𒆨	KISIM5	in some ligatures interchangeable with ÁB
687	396n		278	KISIM_{5} variant			
687	404x_2			Gingira (KISIM_{5}overKISIM_{5})	U+121A9 𒆩	KISIM5 OVER KISIM5	
688	409n; 432_2	DÚBUR: 284		DÚBUR (ḪI×U)	U+12136 𒄶	HI TIMES U	
689	431	364	314	NÁ	U+1223F 𒈿	NA2	
690	433	355	74	NIM	U+1224F 𒉏	NIM	
691	434	356	279	TÙM (NIM×KÁR)	U+12250 𒉐	NIM TIMES GAN2 TENU	
692	434a			KIR_{7} (NIM× NÍG.KÁR)	U+12251 𒉑	NIM TIMES GAR PLUS GAN2 TENU	
693	435	244	306	LAM	U+121F4 𒇴	LAM	
694	436			LAM×KUR	U+121F5 𒇵	LAM TIMES KUR	
695	437	367	155	AMAR (ZUR)	U+1202B 𒀫	AMAR	
696	438	368	156	SISKUR (AMAR×ŠE)	U+1202C 𒀬	AMAR TIMES SHE	
697	438n		276	AMAR×KUG			Hitt.
698	441	344	275	UL (DU_{7})	U+1230C 𒌌	U GUD	
699	442	346		ŠITA_{4} (U.KID)	U+1230B 𒌋 & U+121A4 𒆤	U & KID	
700	443	351		ÚTU (U.GA/ŠU_{4}.GA)	U+1230B 𒌋 & U+120B5 𒂵	U & GA	
701	444	291b	301	GÌR	U+1210A 𒄊	GIR3	
701	444	178		PIRIG	U+1228A 𒊊	PIRIG	
701	444n2			GÌR.GÌRinversum	U+1228E 𒊎	PIRIG OPPOSING PIRIG	
702	421a			LULIM (GÌR× LU.IGI)	U+1210E 𒄎	GIR3 TIMES LU PLUS IGI	reconstruction
703	421	295	303	ALIM (GÌR× A.IGI)	U+1210B 𒄋	GIR3 TIMES A PLUS IGI	
703	421n2	295	303	ALIM (GÌR×IGI)	U+1210D 𒄍	GIR3 TIMES IGI	old
704	445	349	268	DUGUD	U+12082 𒂂	DUGUD	
705	446	350	269	GIG (MI.NUNUZ)	U+1222A 𒈪 & U+1226D 𒉭	MI & NUNUZ	GIG not really splittable
706	447			NIGIN_{4} (U.UD)	U+1230B 𒌋 & U+12313 𒌓	U & UD	
707	447a			NÌGIN (U.UD.KID)	U+1230B 𒌋 & U+12313 𒌓 & U+121A4 𒆤	U & UD & KID	
708	471	363	296	MAN (2×U)	U+12399 𒎙	U U	"20"
709	411+350_8			U.U-gunû	U+1230B 𒌋 & U+12434 𒐴	U & ONE BURU	"60.000"?
710	448	347		KUŠU (U.GÌR/PIRIG)	U+1230B 𒌋 & U+1210A 𒄊 / U+1228A 𒊊	U & GIR3/PIRIG	
711	472	366	331	EŠ (3×U)	U+1230D 𒌍	U U U	"30"
712	473	374	335	NIMIN (4×U)	U+1240F 𒐏	NUMERIC SIGN FOUR U	"40"
713	474			MAŠGI/BARGI (4×U)	U+12310 𒌐	U OVER U U REVERSED OVER U REVERSED	
714	475	376		NINNU (5×U)	U+12410 𒐐	NUMERIC SIGN FIVE U	"50"
715	476			LX (6×U)	U+12411 𒐑	NUMERIC SIGN SIX U	"60"
716	477			7×U	U+12412 𒐒	NUMERIC SIGN SEVEN U	"70"
717	478			8×U	U+12413 𒐓	NUMERIC SIGN EIGHT U	"80"
718	479			9×U	U+12414 𒐔	NUMERIC SIGN NINE U	"90"
719	458	308	186	LAGAR	U+121EC 𒇬	LAGAR	
720	459	360	262	DUL (U.TÚG)	U+1230B 𒌋 & U+12306 𒌆	U & TUG2	DUL not really splittable
721	459a	311	211	DU_{6} (LAGAR-gunû)	U+121EF 𒇯	LAGAR GUNU	
721	459an2	335		DU_{6}overDU_{6}.ŠE	U+121F0 𒇰	LAGAR GUNU OVER LAGAR GUNU SHE	
722	460v	307		SU_{7} (LAGAR×ŠE)	U+121ED 𒇭	LAGAR TIMES SHE	
723	460n			LAGAR× ŠE.SUM	U+121EE 𒇮	LAGAR TIMES SHE PLUS SUM	
724	449	233	288	IGI (ŠI, LIM)	U+12146 𒅆	IGI	
724	449_46	233	288	DIMSAR	U+12149 𒅉	IGI OVER IGI SHIR OVER SHIR UD OVER UD	
725	450	235	292	PÀD (IGI.RU)	U+12146 𒅆 & U+12292 𒊒	IGI & RU	
726	451	234	289	AR (IGI.RI)	U+12148 𒅈	IGI RI	
727	452v1	237	291	AGRIG (IGI.DUB)	U+12146 𒅆 & U+1207E 𒁾	IGI & DUB	
728	449_145	236		U_{6} (IGI.É)	U+12146 𒅆 & U+1208D 𒂍	IGI & E2	
729	454	238	293	SIG_{5} (IGI.ERIM)	U+12146 𒅆 & U+1209F 𒂟	IGI & ERIN2	
730	454			KURUM_{7} (IGI.ERIM)	U+12146 𒅆 & U+1209F 𒂟	IGI & ERIN2	here belongs n735
731	455	239b	265	Ù (IGI.DIB)	U+12147 𒅇	IGI & DIB	
732	455	239a	265	LIBIR (IGI.ŠÈ)	U+12146 𒅆 & U+120A0 𒂠	IGI & ESH2	
733	456	240	290	ḪUL (IGI.UR)	U+12146 𒅆 & U+12328 𒌨	IGI & UR	
734	456a			ḪUL_{4} (IGI.UR-šeššig)	U+12146 𒅆 & U+1232A 𒌪	IGI & UR SHESHIG	reconstruction
735	449_244			KURUM_{7} (IGI.NÍG)	U+12146 𒅆 & U+120FB 𒃻	IGI & GAR	reconstruction, belongs to n730
736	457	431	312	DI	U+12072 𒁲	DI	
737	461	432	313	KI	U+121A0 𒆠	KI	
738	462v	430		KI×BAD	U+121A1 𒆡	KI TIMES BAD	belongs to n740
739	463			KI×UD	U+121A3 𒆣	KI TIMES UD	
740	462	430		KI×U	U+121A2 𒆢	KI TIMES U	
741	461x	418	3	PÉŠ	U+1227E 𒉾	PESH2	see MesZL n882
742	461_280; 464			KIMIN			
743	466	440		KIŠI_{4}	U+12294 𒊔	SAG NUTILLU	
744	467	ŠUL:438	46	ŠUL (DUN)	U+12084 𒂄	DUN	
745	468	428	69	KUG (KÙ)	U+121AC 𒆬	KU3	
746	469	362	295	PAD (ŠUK)	U+1227B 𒉻	PAD	
747	470			XV (U.IÁ)	U+1230B 𒌋 & U+1240A	U & NUMERIC SIGN FIVE DISH	"15"

== DIŠ ==
MesZL	ŠL/HA	aBZL	HethZL	Sign Name	Unicode code point	Unicode Name	Comments
748	480	390	356	DIŠ (1)	U+12079 𒁹	DISH	DIŠ "1", GEŠ_{2} "60"
749	480		356	NIGIDA (DIŠ)			use U+12079 𒁹 DISH
750	481	391	358	LAL (LÁ)	U+121F2 𒇲	LAL	
751	482		362	LÁL (LAL×LAL)	U+121F3 𒇳	LAL TIMES LAL	
752	482, 585b			LÁL			Neo-Assyrian: use U+121F3 𒇳; here belongs also n849
753	532	392	357	ME	U+12228 𒈨	ME	"100". Can mean priest in some cases.
754	533, 533v1		360	MEŠ	U+1238C 𒎌	MESH	"90", plural sign
755	483	402	179	LAGAB	U+121B8 𒆸	LAGAB	
756	484	404	216	ENGUR (LAGAB×ḪAL)	U+121C9 𒇉	LAGAB TIMES HAL	
757	484			ZIKUM			Neo-Assyrian: use U+121C9 𒇉 LAGAB TIMES HAL
758	484a			LAGAB×AN	U+121BE 𒆾	LAGAB TIMES AN	
759	485			LAGAB×KÍD	U+121E3 𒇣	LAGAB TIMES TAK4	
760	486	405	224	GIGIR (LAGAB×BAD)	U+121C0 𒇀	LAGAB TIMES BAD	
761	487	406		ÉSIR (LAGAB×NUMUN)	U+121D2 𒇒	LAGAB TIMES KUL	
762	488			LAGAB× NUMUN.ḪI.A	U+121D3 𒇓	LAGAB TIMES KUL PLUS HI PLUS A	
763	488a			LAGAB×GI	U+12388 𒎈	LAGAB TIMES GI	
764	488b			LAGAB×EN	U+121C3 𒇃	LAGAB TIMES EN	
765	489			LAGAB×DAR	U+121C2 𒇂	LAGAB TIMES DAR	
766	494	399	45	U_{8} (LAGAB× GU_{4}overGU_{4}	U+121C7 𒇇	LAGAB TIMES GUD PLUS GUD	Unicode: better ... GUD OVER GUD
767	491	413	181	ZAR (LAGAB×SUM)	U+121E1 𒇡	LAGAB TIMES SUM	
768	495			UDUB (LAGAB×NE)	U+121DB 𒇛	LAGAB TIMES NE	
769	496			LAGAB×BI	U+121C1 𒇁	LAGAB TIMES BI	
770	495a			LAGAB×UŠ	U+121EA 𒇪	LAGAB TIMES USH	
771	497			LAGAB×ŠÍTA	U+121DE 𒇞	LAGAB TIMES SHITA PLUS GISH TENU	TENU pertinent? cf. Gong p154 and 220
771	497n			LAGAB× ŠÍTA.ERIM	U+121DD 𒇝	LAGAB TIMES SHITA PLUS GISH PLUS ERIN2	
772	493	407		LAGAB×GU_{4}	U+121C6 𒇆	LAGAB TIMES GUD	
773	498			LAGAB×AL	U+121BD 𒆽	LAGAB TIMES AL	
774	499v			LAGAB× Ú.AŠ	U+121E8 𒇨	LAGAB TIMES U2 PLUS ASH	
775	499n			LAGAB×GA	U+121C4 𒇄	LAGAB TIMES GA	
776	500; 501	409		ŠÁRA (LAGAB×SIG_{7})	U+121CB 𒇋	LAGAB TIMES IGI GUNU	
777	502			LAGAB×LUL	U+121D7 𒇗	LAGAB TIMES LUL	
778	504			LAGAB×GE_{23}	U+121BF 𒆿	LAGAB TIMES ASH ZIDA TENU	uncertain
779	492			LAGAB× ŠE.SUM	U+121DC 𒇜	LAGAB TIMES SHE PLUS SUM	
780	507			LAGAB×MUŠ	U+121DA 𒇚	LAGAB TIMES MUSH	
781	508			LAGAB× KAR.SU.NA	U+121E4 𒇤	LAGAB TIMES TE PLUS A PLUS SU PLUS NA	
782	503			LAGAB×LIŠ	U+121D5 𒇕	LAGAB TIMES LISH	
783	505			LAGAB×UD	U+121E9 𒇩	LAGAB TIMES UD	
784	509			LAGAB×AḪ	U+121CA 𒇊	LAGAB TIMES HI TIMES NUN	
785	510			LAGAB×IM	U+121CC 𒇌	LAGAB TIMES IM	
786	511	410	180	TÚL (LAGAB×U)	U+121E5 𒇥	LAGAB TIMES U	
787	512	412		LAGAB× U.A	U+121E6 𒇦	LAGAB TIMES U PLUS A	
788	515	411		BUL (LAGAB×EŠ)	U+121E7 𒇧	LAGAB TIMES U PLUS U PLUS U	
789	514			LAGAB×KI	U+121CF 𒇏	LAGAB TIMES KI	
790	513			GARIM (LAGAB×KUG)	U+121D1 𒇑	LAGAB TIMES KU3	
791	516			LAGAB×ME	U+121D8 𒇘	LAGAB TIMES ME	
792	517			LAGAB× ME.EN	U+121D9 𒇙	LAGAB TIMES ME PLUS EN	
793	518			LAGAB×LU	U+121D6 𒇖	LAGAB TIMES LU	
794	519			LAGAB×KIN	U+121D0 𒇐	LAGAB TIMES KIN	
795	522	414	182	SUG (LAGAB×A)	U+121B9 𒆹	LAGAB TIMES A	
796	523			LAGAB× A.TAR			uncertain
797	523x; 524			LAGAB× A.DA.ḪA	U+121BA 𒆺	LAGAB TIMES A PLUS DA PLUS HA	
798	525			LAGAB× A.LAL	U+121BC 𒆼	LAGAB TIMES A PLUS LAL	
799	526			LAGAB× A.NÍG/GAR	U+121BB 𒆻	LAGAB TIMES A PLUS GAR	
800	527			LAGAB×ḪA	U+121C8 𒇈	LAGAB TIMES HA	
801	528	408	55	LAGAB×NÍG	U+121C5 𒇅	LAGAB TIMES GAR	
802	520			LAGAB×ŠÚ	U+121DF 𒇟	LAGAB TIMES SHU2	
803	521			LAGAB× ŠÚ.ŠÚ	U+121E0 𒇠	LAGAB TIMES SHU2 PLUS SHU2	
804	529	403		NIGIN (LAGAB+LAGAB, LAGAB.LAGAB)	U+121B8 𒆸 & U+121B8 𒆸	LAGAB & LAGAB	
804	529v2			NIGIN (LAGAB×LAGAB)	U+121D4 𒇔	LAGAB TIMES LAGAB	
805	530			4×LAGAB forming a cross	U+121EB 𒇫	LAGAB SQUARED	
806	515_9			NENNI (BUL+BUL, BUL.BUL)	BUL.BUL: U+121E7 𒇧 & U+121E7 𒇧	LAGAB TIMES U PLUS U PLUS U & LAGAB TIMES U PLUS U PLUS U	
807	535	394	44	IB	U+12141 𒅁	IB	
808	536	415	206	KU (DÚR, TUKUL, TUŠ)	U+121AA 𒆪	KU	
808	536	415	206	KU (DÚR, TUKUL, TUŠ)	U+12089 𒂉	DUR2	
809	536	417	212	TÚG (NÁM)	U+12306 𒌆	TUG2	
809	536	417	212	TÚG (NÁM)	U+12247 𒉇	NAM2	
810	536	420	212	ŠÈ (ÉŠ, GI_{7}, ZÌ)	U+120A0 𒂠	ESH2	
810	536	420	212	ŠÈ (ÉŠ, GI_{7}, ZÌ)	U+12365 𒍥	ZI3	
811	536			"KU" = DIŠ+ŠU	U+12375 𒍵	DISH PLUS SHU	"60"; ligatur, see MesZL n748
812	537	416	210	LU (UDU)	U+121FB 𒇻	LU	
813	537	419	210?	DIB (DAB)	U+12073 𒁳	DIB	
814	537_65c; 537x			ÀD (LU×BAD)	U+121FC 𒇼	LU TIMES BAD	
815	538	447	47	KIN	U+121A5 𒆥	KIN	
816	539	395	65	SÍG / SÍK	U+122E0 𒋠	SIK2	
817	540	421		DARA_{4} (SÍG+AŠ)	U+12071 𒁱	DARA4	
818	541	398	62	EREN (SÍG.NUN)	U+1209E 𒂞	EREN	
819	542	396		GUR_{7} (SÍG.AḪ.ME.U)	U+12126 𒄦	GUR7	
820	543			MUNŠUB (MUNSUB; SÍG.SUḪUR)	U+12230 𒈰	MUNSUB	
821	544		63	ŠÉŠ (SÍG.LAM)	U+122C1 𒋁	SHESH2	
822	544+389 +532+411			SÍG.LAM.AḪ.ME.U			to be deleted?
823	543v2			MÚNŠUB (SÍG.LAM.SUḪUR)	U+122C1 𒋁 & U+122E6 𒋦	SHESH2 & SUHUR	
824	534			DIŠ.U	U+12079 𒁹 & U+1230B 𒌋	DISH & U	"600"
825	570	465	361	MIN (2)	U+1222B 𒈫	MIN	"2"
826	571	439	48	ŠUŠANA (1/3)	U+1245A 𒑚	NUMERIC SIGN ONE THIRD DISH	"1/3"
827	574	444	53	TUK (TUG)	U+12307 𒌇	TUK	
828	575	400	51	UR	U+12328 𒌨	UR	
828	575a	252	51	URBINGU (URoverURcrossed)	U+12329 𒌩	UR CROSSING UR	
829	575b	220		UR-šeššig	U+1232A 𒌪	UR SHESHIG	reconstruction
829	575bv1			"UR×A"			see MesZL 829
829	575bv2			"UR×MIN"			see MesZL 829
830	576	426	52	GIDIM	U+12107 𒄇	GIDIM	Unicode reference glyph wrong?
831	578a				U+1222B 𒈫 & U+1230D 𒌍	MIN & U U U	numeral "2,30"
832	572	441		ŠANABI (2/3)	U+1245B 𒑛	NUMERIC SIGN TWO THIRDS DISH	"2/3"
833	577; 578	442		UDUG	U+1231C 𒌜	UDUG	Unicode reference glyph wrong?
834	593	EŠ5:469	368	EŠ_{5}(3)	U+12408 𒐈	NUMERIC SIGN THREE DISH	"3"
835	594	448		UR_{4}	U+12334 𒌴	UR4	
836	595	TÙN:401a, GÍN:401b	223; 209.2	GÍN (TÙN)	U+12085 𒂅	DUN3	
837	593v			IŠŠEBU (3,20)	U+12408 𒐈 & U+12399 𒎙	NUMERIC SIGN THREE DISH & U U	numeral "3,20" (10/3, 200)
838	573			KINGUSILA	U+1245C 𒑜	NUMERIC SIGN FIVE SIXTHS DISH	"5/6"
839	579	470	364; 365	A	U+12000 𒀀	A	
839	579n			A.TU.GAB.LIŠ	U+12037 𒀷	ASAL2	forerunner ASAL_{x}, not ASAL_{2}. Cf Krebernik OBO 160/1 283
840	580			AGAM (A×BAD)	U+12002 𒀂	A TIMES BAD	
841	585			A×SAG	U+12008 𒀈	A TIMES SAG	
842	580a			A×MUŠ	U+12007 𒀇	A TIMES MUSH	
843	582			A×DU_{6}	U+12006 𒀆	A TIMES LAGAR GUNU	
844	581			A×IGI	U+12005 𒀅	A TIMES IGI	
845	583			EDURU (A×A)	U+12001 𒀁	A TIMES A	
846	584; 587	471		ZÀḪ (A×ḪA)	U+12004 𒀄	A TIMES HA	
847	585a			DIŠoverDIŠ			"4"; Neo-Assyrian: use U+12456 𒑖
848	585a			NIGIDAMIN (DIŠoverDIŠ)	U+12456 𒑖	NUMERIC SIGN NIGIDAMIN	"4"
849	585b			LÁL variant	U+12456 𒑖 & U+1227D 𒉽	NIGIDAMIN & PAP	belongs to n752
850	585c			NIGIDAEŠ (DIŠoverDIŠ.DIŠ)	U+12457 𒑗	NUMERIC SIGN NIGIDAESH	
851	586	474	366	ZA	U+1235D 𒍝	ZA	
852	586	474		LIMMU_{5} ("ZA")	U+1235D 𒍝	ZA	
852	586	474		LIMMU_{5} ("ZA")	U+12409 𒐉	NUMERIC SIGN FOUR DISH	"4"
853	586			NIGIDALIMMU ("ZA")	U+1235D 𒍝	ZA	
853	586			NIGIDALIMMU ("ZA")	U+12409 𒐉	NUMERIC SIGN FOUR DISH	"4"
854	379_2	245		AD_{4} (ZA-tenû)	U+1235E 𒍞	ZA TENU	
855	531; 588			GIŠTA'E (4×ZA ×KUR)	U+1235F 𒍟	ZA SQUARED TIMES KUR	
856	589	475	367	ḪA (KU_{6})	U+12129 𒄩	HA	
857	590			ZUBUD (ḪA -tenû)	U+1212A 𒄪	HA TENU	
858	591			GUG (ZA.GUL)	U+1235D 𒍝 & U+12122 𒄢	ZA & GUL	
859	597	473	369	NÍG (GAR, NINDA)	U+120FB 𒃻	GAR	
860	597	472	370	LIMMU ("NÍG", 4)	U+1243C 𒐼	NUMERIC SIGN FOUR VARIANT FORM LIMMU	"4"; variants: U+1243E 𒐾, U+1243F 𒐿
861	598a	476	371	IÁ (5)	U+1240A 𒐊	NUMERIC SIGN FIVE DISH	"5"
862	598b	477	372	ÀŠ	U+1240B 𒐋	NUMERIC SIGN SIX DISH	"6"
863	598n1	478	373	IMIN (7)	U+12153 𒅓	IMIN	
863	598n1	478	373	IMIN (7)	U+1240C 𒐌	NUMERIC SIGN SEVEN DISH	"7"; see also n866
864	598n2	479	374	USSU (8)	U+1240D 𒐍	NUMERIC SIGN EIGHT DISH	"8"; see also n867
865	598en			DIŠoverDIŠoverDIŠ	U+12449 𒑉	NUMERIC SIGN NINE VARIANT FORM ILIMMU A	"9"
866	598c	478	373	IMIN (7)	U+12442 𒑂	NUMERIC SIGN SEVEN VARIANT FORM IMIN A	"7"; see also n863
867	598d		374	USSU (8)	U+12444 𒑄	NUMERIC SIGN EIGHT VARIANT FORM USSU	"8"; see also n864
868	598e	480	375	ILIMMU (9)	U+12446 𒑆	NUMERIC SIGN NINE VARIANT FORM ILIMMU	"9"
869	545	422	251	ŠÚ	U+122D9 𒋙	SHU2	
869	545a				U+1245F 𒑟	NUMERIC SIGN ONE EIGHTH ASH	presargonic unit of measure LAK 852
870	546		(251)	ÉN (ŠÚ.AN)	U+122D9 𒋙 & U+1202D 𒀭	SHU2 & AN	
871	546_6	423		KÈŠ (ÉN. ŠÁR×GAD)	U+122D9 𒋙 & U+1202D 𒀭 & U+12132 𒄲	SHU2 & AN & HI TIMES GAD	
872	547	424		KUNGA (ŠÚ.MUL)	U+122D9 𒋙 & U+1202F 𒀯	SHU2 & AN THREE TIMES	
873	551			ŠEG_{8} (ŠÚ.NAGA)	U+122D9 𒋙 & U+12240 𒉀	SHU2 & NAGA	
874	552			LIL_{5} (ŠÚ.NE)	U+122D9 𒋙 & U+12248 𒉈	SHU2 & NE	
875	548	427		GÍBIL (ŠÚ.ÁŠ)	U+122D9 𒋙 & U+1203E 𒀾	SHU2 & ASH2	
876	549			ŠUDUN (ŠÚ.DUN_{4})	U+122D9 𒋙 & U+12088 𒂈	SHU2 & DUN4	
877	550	425	254	ḪÚL	U+1213E 𒄾	HUL2	
878	551v	429		ŠEG_{9} (ŠÚ.ŠE.KU.GAG)	U+122BE 𒊾	SHEG9	
879	553			LÌL (ŠÚ.EŠ)	U+122D9 𒋙 & U+1230D 𒌍	SHU2 & U U U	
880	550a; 553a			ŠÚ.UR-šeššig	U+122D9 𒋙 & U+1232A 𒌪	SHU2 & UR SHESHIG	reconstruction
881	592	437	255	SIG	U+122DD 𒋝	SIG	
882	596	418	3	PÉŠ	[U+1227E 𒉾]	PESH2	variant: n741. code point only for one sign form!
883	554	450	297	MUNUS (SAL)	U+122A9 𒊩	SAL	
884	555	456	300	ZUM	U+1236E 𒍮	ZUM	
885	555B			ZÚM (ZUM×LAGAB)	U+122AA 𒊪	SAL LAGAB TIMES ASH2	reconstruction
886	556	451	299	NIN_{9}, old MUNUS.KU	U+122A9 𒊩 & U+121AA 𒆪	SAL & KU	NeoAssyrian: SAL & MA(U+12220 𒈠)
887	556	452	299	NIN, old MUNUS.TÚG	U+122A9 𒊩 & U+12306 𒌆	SAL & TUG2	
888	556			MUNUS+MA			mim-ma ligature
889	557	454	298	DAM	U+1206E 𒁮	DAM	
890	558	459	305	GÉME (MUNUS.KUR)	U+122A9 𒊩 & U+121B3 𒆳	SAL & KUR	
891	559	458	304	GU	U+12116 𒄖	GU	
892	569	251		SÙḪ (GUoverGUcrossed)	U+12117 𒄗	GU CROSSING GU	
893	560	449	308	NAGAR	U+12244 𒉄	NAGAR	
894	561			TUGUL (NAGAR.AD_{4})	U+12244 𒉄 & U+1235E 𒍞	NAGAR & ZA TENU	
895	554n			MUNUS.LAGAR	U+122A9 𒊩 & U+121EC 𒇬	SAL & LAGAR	
896	562	457		KÚŠU	U+121B5 𒆵	KUSHU2	
897	554_84; 556_8	453		ÉGI (MUNUS.ŠÈ)	U+122A9 𒊩 & U+120A0 𒂠	SAL & ESH2	
898	563	461		NIG (MUNUS.UR)	U+122A9 𒊩 & U+12328 𒌨	SAL & UR	
899	564	455	307	EL	U+12096 𒂖	EL	
900	565	248	310	LUM	U+1221D 𒈝	LUM	
901	565	242	311	MÚRGU ("LUM")	U+12231 𒈱	MURGU2	
902	565a; 566a			LUMoverLUM	U+1221E 𒈞	LUM OVER LUM	
903	566			LUMoverLUM.ŠÚ	U+1221E 𒈞 & U+122D9 𒋙	LUM OVER LUM & SHU2	
904	566b			LÙGUD (LUMoverLUM.NÍGoverNÍG)	U+1221F 𒈟	LUM OVER LUM GAR OVER GAR	
905	567	243	311	SIG_{4}	U+122DE 𒋞	SIG4	
906	567	243	311	MURGU ("SIG_{4}")	U+122DE 𒋞	SIG4	
907	568			SIG_{4}overSIG_{4}.ŠÚ	U+122DF 𒋟	SIG4 OVER SIG4 SHU2	

== See also ==
- Liste der archaischen Keilschriftzeichen
- Unicode cuneiform
