= Early Dynastic Cuneiform =

- Range: U+12480..U+1254F (208 code points)
- Plane: SMP
- Scripts: Cuneiform
- Assigned: 196 code points
- Unused: 12 reserved code points

Unicode Version History
- 8.0 (2015): 196 (+196)

Unicode documentation
- Code chart ∣ Web page

Early Dynastic Cuneiform is a Unicode block of the Supplementary Multilingual Plane (SMP), at U+12480–U+1254F, introduced in version 8.0 (June 2015). It is a supplement to the earlier encoding of the cuneiform script in the two blocks U+12000–U+123FF "Cuneiform" and U+12400–U+1247F "Cuneiform Numbers and Punctuation".

"Early Dynastic Cuneiform" is designed to provide cuneiform signs used during one of the earliest phases of cuneiform writing, the Early Dynastic Period (c. 2900–2350 BC), also known as archaic cuneiform, but discontinued in the Ur III period. The original Cuneiform block, introduced in version 5.0 (July 2006) is designed for the requirements of Ur III era cuneiform, with the younger (Old Assyrian and Neo-Assyrian) literary tradition to be considered font variants (analogous to the precedent of the approach followed in Han unification). Even for the Ur III era, many signs recognized in relevant dictionaries did not receive their own code point but are intended as being expressed as ligatures of two or more constituent signs, to be handled by the font, but for the purposes of representing archaic cuneiform, the inventory of the original block was recognized as insufficient and an additional 196 characters were added in version 8.0. The sign inventory is mostly based on the 1922 dictionary Liste der archaischen Keilschriftzeichen (LAK), with a substantial number of characters (U+124D5 to U+12518) identified by their LAK number (or as composed of characters identified by their LAK number) rather than attempting to identify them by a reconstructed phonetic value. The LAK has 870 signs in total, most of which are already covered in the previous Unicode blocks in the form of their Ur III continuants. The Preliminary Proposal for the block was submitted in 2012.

== Chart ==
Early Dynastic Cuneiform^{[1]}^{[2]} Official Unicode Consortium code chart (PDF)
| | 0 | 1 | 2 | 3 | 4 | 5 | 6 | 7 | 8 | 9 | A | B | C | D | E | F |
| U+1248x | 𒒀 | 𒒁 | 𒒂 | 𒒃 | 𒒄 | 𒒅 | 𒒆 | 𒒇 | 𒒈 | 𒒉 | 𒒊 | 𒒋 | 𒒌 | 𒒍 | 𒒎 | 𒒏 |
| U+1249x | 𒒐 | 𒒑 | 𒒒 | 𒒓 | 𒒔 | 𒒕 | 𒒖 | 𒒗 | 𒒘 | 𒒙 | 𒒚 | 𒒛 | 𒒜 | 𒒝 | 𒒞 | 𒒟 |
| U+124Ax | 𒒠 | 𒒡 | 𒒢 | 𒒣 | 𒒤 | 𒒥 | 𒒦 | 𒒧 | 𒒨 | 𒒩 | 𒒪 | 𒒫 | 𒒬 | 𒒭 | 𒒮 | 𒒯 |
| U+124Bx | 𒒰 | 𒒱 | 𒒲 | 𒒳 | 𒒴 | 𒒵 | 𒒶 | 𒒷 | 𒒸 | 𒒹 | 𒒺 | 𒒻 | 𒒼 | 𒒽 | 𒒾 | 𒒿 |
| U+124Cx | 𒓀 | 𒓁 | 𒓂 | 𒓃 | 𒓄 | 𒓅 | 𒓆 | 𒓇 | 𒓈 | 𒓉 | 𒓊 | 𒓋 | 𒓌 | 𒓍 | 𒓎 | 𒓏 |
| U+124Dx | 𒓐 | 𒓑 | 𒓒 | 𒓓 | 𒓔 | 𒓕 | 𒓖 | 𒓗 | 𒓘 | 𒓙 | 𒓚 | 𒓛 | 𒓜 | 𒓝 | 𒓞 | 𒓟 |
| U+124Ex | 𒓠 | 𒓡 | 𒓢 | 𒓣 | 𒓤 | 𒓥 | 𒓦 | 𒓧 | 𒓨 | 𒓩 | 𒓪 | 𒓫 | 𒓬 | 𒓭 | 𒓮 | 𒓯 |
| U+124Fx | 𒓰 | 𒓱 | 𒓲 | 𒓳 | 𒓴 | 𒓵 | 𒓶 | 𒓷 | 𒓸 | 𒓹 | 𒓺 | 𒓻 | 𒓼 | 𒓽 | 𒓾 | 𒓿 |
| U+1250x | 𒔀 | 𒔁 | 𒔂 | 𒔃 | 𒔄 | 𒔅 | 𒔆 | 𒔇 | 𒔈 | 𒔉 | 𒔊 | 𒔋 | 𒔌 | 𒔍 | 𒔎 | 𒔏 |
| U+1251x | 𒔐 | 𒔑 | 𒔒 | 𒔓 | 𒔔 | 𒔕 | 𒔖 | 𒔗 | 𒔘 | 𒔙 | 𒔚 | 𒔛 | 𒔜 | 𒔝 | 𒔞 | 𒔟 |
| U+1252x | 𒔠 | 𒔡 | 𒔢 | 𒔣 | 𒔤 | 𒔥 | 𒔦 | 𒔧 | 𒔨 | 𒔩 | 𒔪 | 𒔫 | 𒔬 | 𒔭 | 𒔮 | 𒔯 |
| U+1253x | 𒔰 | 𒔱 | 𒔲 | 𒔳 | 𒔴 | 𒔵 | 𒔶 | 𒔷 | 𒔸 | 𒔹 | 𒔺 | 𒔻 | 𒔼 | 𒔽 | 𒔾 | 𒔿 |
| U+1254x | 𒕀 | 𒕁 | 𒕂 | 𒕃 | | | | | | | | | | | | |
Notes 1.As of Unicode version 17.0 2.Grey areas indicate non-assigned code points

== History ==
The following Unicode-related documents record the purpose and process of defining specific characters in the Early Dynastic Cuneiform block:

| Version | Final code points (Note: Proposed code points and characters names may differ from final code points and names) | Count | L2 ID | WG2 ID | Document |
|---|---|---|---|---|---|
| 8.0 | U+12480..12543 | 196 | L2/12-024 | N4179 | Everson, Michael (2012-01-27), Preliminary proposal for encoding Early Dynastic Cuneiform |
| 8.0 | U+12480..12543 | 196 | L2/12-208 | N4278 | Everson, Michael (2012-06-13), Proposal for Early Dynastic Cuneiform |
| 8.0 | U+12480..12543 | 196 | L2/12-239 | | Moore, Lisa (2012-08-14), "C.4", UTC #132 Minutes |
| 8.0 | U+12480..12543 | 196 | L2/12-389 | | Anderson, Deborah (2012-11-08), Duplicate EARLY DYNASTIC CUNEIFORM character: U+124D2 CUNEIFORM SIGN KA TIMES U |
| 8.0 | U+12480..12543 | 196 | L2/12-343R2 | | Moore, Lisa (2012-12-04), "Consensus 133-C37", UTC #133 Minutes, "Rescind approval of U+124D2 CUNEIFORM SIGN KA TIMES U." |
| 8.0 | U+12480..12543 | 196 | | N4353 (pdf, doc) | "M60.11", Unconfirmed minutes of WG 2 meeting 60, 2013-05-23 |
| 8.0 | U+12480..12543 | 196 | L2/13-132 | | Moore, Lisa (2013-07-29), "Consensus 136-C16", UTC #136 Minutes, "Approve a change in range for Early Dynastic Cuneiform ..." |
| 8.0 | U+12480..12543 | 196 | | N4403 (pdf, doc) | Umamaheswaran, V. S. (2014-01-28), "Resolution M61.02 item d", Unconfirmed minutes of WG 2 meeting 61, Holiday Inn, Vilnius, Lithuania; 2013-06-10/14 |
