= Winkelhaken =

Basic wedge element in Akkadian cuneiform

The Winkelhaken (German: [ˈvɪŋkəlˌhaːkən], "angular hook"), also simply called a hook, is one of five basic wedge elements appearing in the composition of signs in Akkadian cuneiform. It was realized by pressing the point of the stylus into the clay.

A single Winkelhaken corresponds to the sign U (Borger 1981 nr. 411, Borger 2003 nr. 661), encoded in Unicode at code point U+1230B 𒌋.

other signs consisting of Winkelhaken:

- A Glossenkeil (Borger nr. 378) is a cuneiform character, consisting of either two Winkelhaken (U+12471 𒑱), or of two parallel short diagonal wedges (U+12472 𒑲, similar to GAM), Borger 2003 nr. 592, which serves as a sort of punctuation, as it were as quote sign, marking foreign words or names, or as separation mark, transliterated as a colon ':'.
- two Winkelhaken, MAN, XX "20", Borger 2003 nr. 708
- three Winkelhaken, EŠ, XXX "30", Borger 2003 nr. 711, U+1230D 𒌍
- four Winkelhaken, NIMIN, XL "40", Borger 2003 nr. 712, U+1240F 𒐏
- four Winkelhaken, two of them reversed MAŠGI, BARGI, Borger 2003 nr. 713, U+12310 𒌐
- five Winkelhaken, NINNU, L "50", Borger 2003 nr. 714, U+12410 𒐐
- six Winkelhaken, LX "60", Borger 2003 nr. 715, U+12411 𒐑
- seven Winkelhaken, Borger 2003 nr. 716, U+12412 𒐒
- eight Winkelhaken, Borger 2003 nr. 717, U+12413 𒐓
- nine Winkelhaken, Borger 2003 nr. 718, U+12414 𒐔
