= Dehmel =

Dehmel is a surname. Demel and Deimel are variants of the surname. Notable people with the surname include:

- Ernst Dehmel (1915–1945), German major during World War II
- Joachim Dehmel (born 1969), German middle-distance runner
- Jürgen Dehmel (born 1958), German bass player and songwriter
- Richard Dehmel (1863–1920), German poet and writer
