= Tell Uqair =

Tell or settlement mound northeast of ancient Babylon in modern Iraq

- Urum
- Tell Uquair, Tell Aqair
- Location within Iraq
- 32°46′54″N 44°39′53″E
- Type: tell
- Location: Babil Governorate, Iraq
- Region: Mesopotamia

Site notes
- Excavation dates: 1941–1942, 1978
- Archaeologists: S. Lloyd, Taha Baqir, F. Safar, M. Müller-Karpe

Tell Uqair (Tell 'Uquair, Tell Aqair) is a tell or settlement mound northeast of ancient Babylon, about 25 kilometers north-northeast of the ancient city of Kish, just north of Kutha, and about 50 miles (80 km) south of Baghdad in modern Babil Governorate, Iraq. It was occupied in the Ubaid period (c. 5500–3700 BC) and the Uruk period (c. 4000–3100 BC). It has been proposed as the site of the 3rd millennium BC city of Urum.

== Archaeology ==
Tell Uqair is a small mound just north of, and in sight of, Tell Ibrahim, the large mound marking the site of ancient Kutha. It lies about halfway between the Tigris and Euphrates rivers. The topography consists of two contiguous mounds, north (Mound B) and south (Mound A), separated by what is apparently the bed of an ancient canal. At maximum the hills are 6 meters above the terrain line (aside from a small 10 meter prominence on the west end of Mound A), with many levels having been eroded from the tops. The site has a total area of about 6 hectares. One mound contains a Protoliterate temple and 5 meter deep D-shaped platform (topped by a smaller 1.6 deep rectangular platform). and the other an Early Dynastic III cemetery. Two stairways, on opposite sides, ascended to the lower platform and another, halfway between, ascended to the upper platform. The temple mound (Mound A) has seven occupation levels. Buildings from the earlier Ubaid period levels are of pisé and the later Uruk period of rectangular mudbricks. After the Ubaid period only the temple and the southern half of Mound A was occupied.

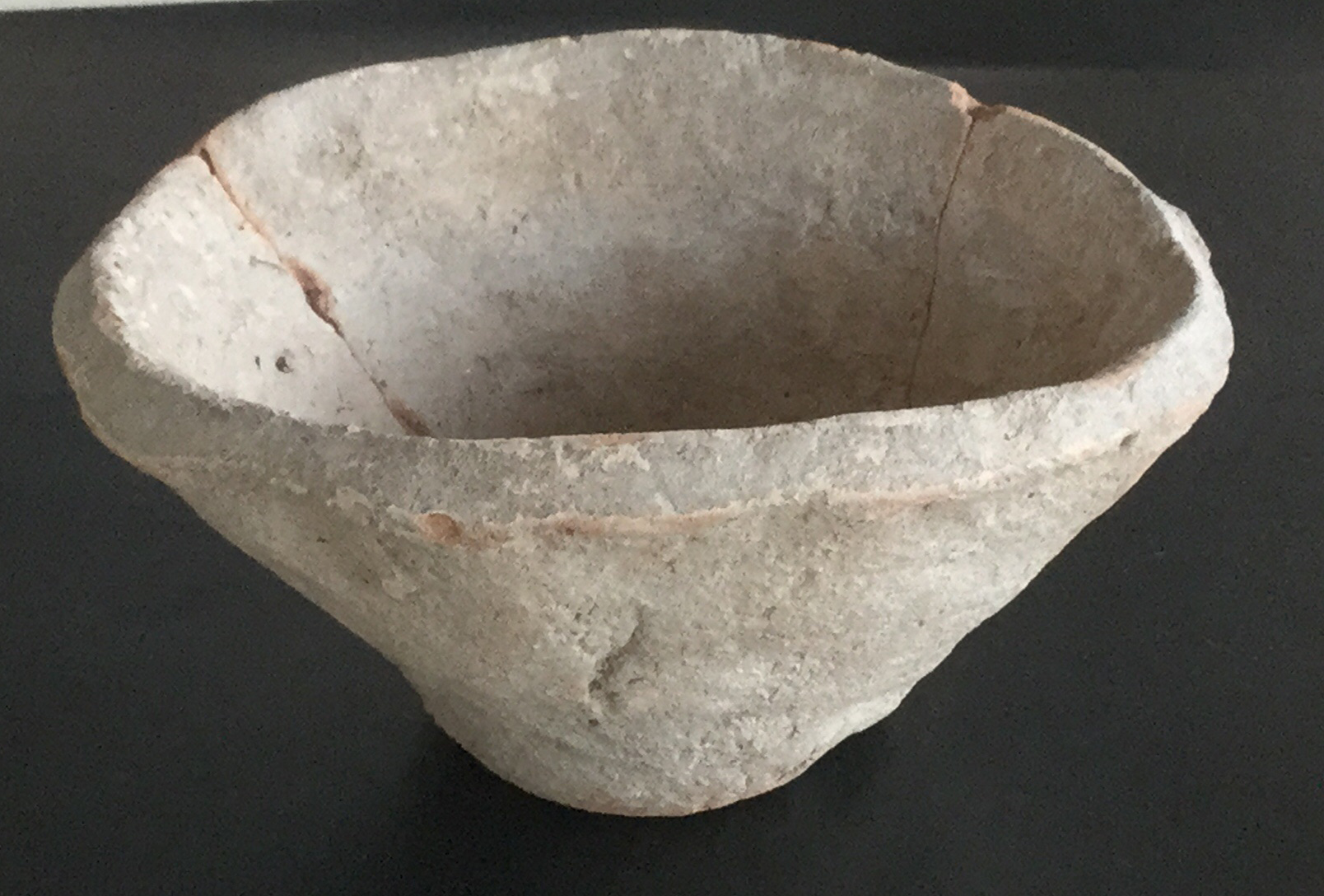
Beveled Rim Bowl

A number of beveled rim bowls, characteristic of the Uruk period, were found in the temple precincts. The site of Tell Uqair was excavated, consisting of several soundings, during World War II, in 1941 and 1942, by an Iraqi Directorate General of Antiquities team led by Seton Lloyd, with Taha Baqir and Fuad Safar. Work proceeded for one month in 1940 and two months in 1941. The buildings and artifacts discovered were primarily from the Ubaid period, the Uruk period, and the Jemdet Nasr period and included four Proto-Cuneiform tablets. An Early Dynastic, with a few later inclusions, cemetery was also excavated. The graves contained a variety of grave goods, mostly pottery. In one grave three Gutium seals were found and in another an Akkadian period seal. One grave contained a pair of copper sandals. Five Neolithic clay tokens were also found. A sounding was done on Mound B, adjacent to the 1940 excavations pit, by a team from the Heidelberg University directed by Dr. M. Müller-Karpe in October 1978. Work focused on Early Dynastic I/II houses which were cut by ED III graves. The sounding found occupation down to the water table at 3.5 meters below the surface level of the tell.

While only four Proto-cuneiform tablets were found at Tell Uqair, another 27 from there have appeared on the antiquities market and been published. Some deal with loans of barley. A city seal on one of the tablets matched a seal on a tablet found at Jemdat Nasr. It has been proposed that this site was part of a group providing ritual products to Inana at Uruk.

During the 1940s excavations a deep sounding into the Ubaid levels recovered shells. Radiocarbon dating in 1968 in produced a calibrated date of 4649 BC, midway through the Ubaid period.

== History ==
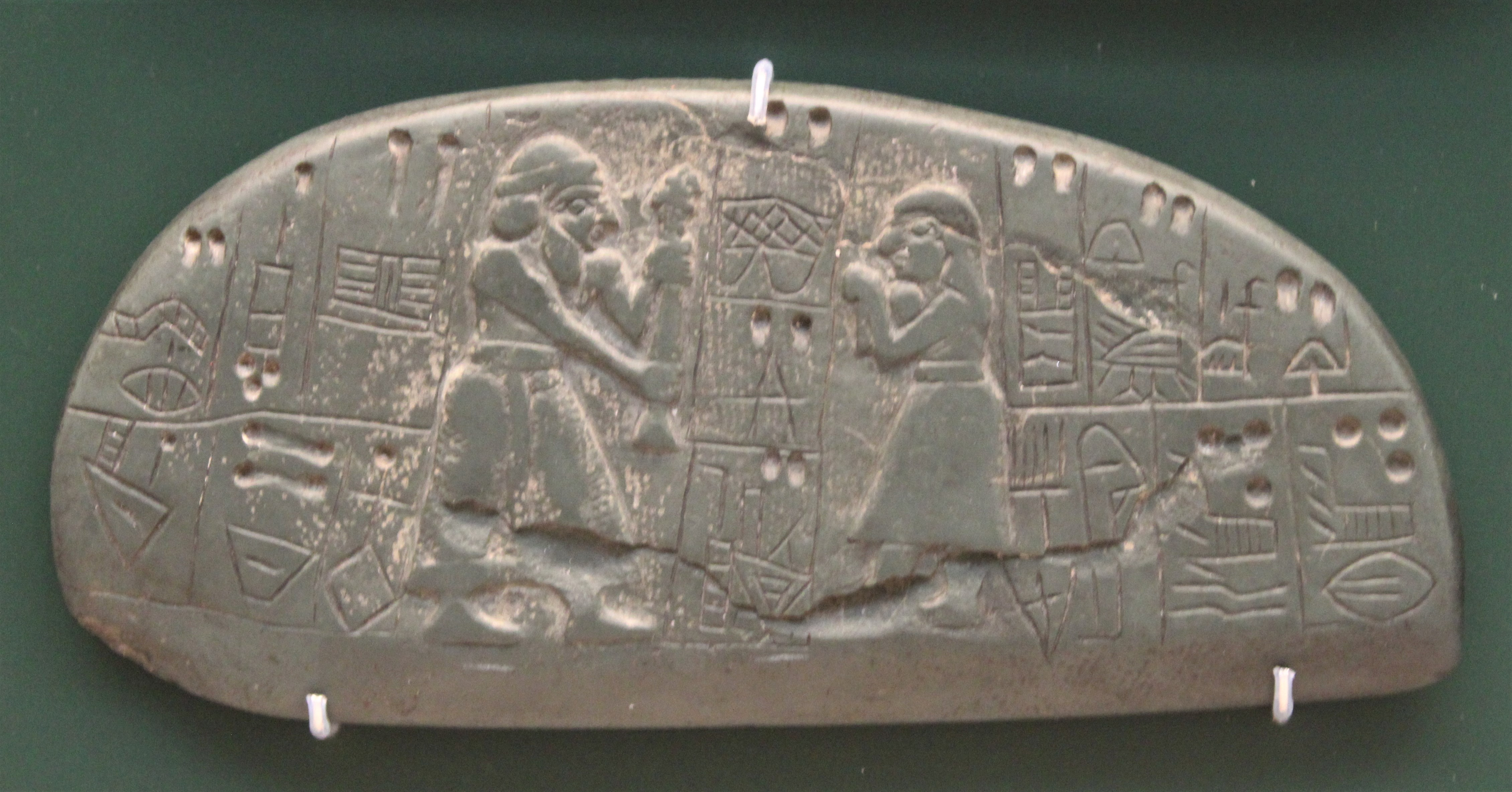
Blau monuments plaque obverse

The site of Tell Uqair first had significant occupation during the Ubaid period, and grew to its greatest extent during the Jemdet Nasr and Uruk periods. Some Early Dynastic graves and a scattering of Akkadian and Babylonian artifacts indicate the location continued in limited use up through the time of Nebuchadnezzar.

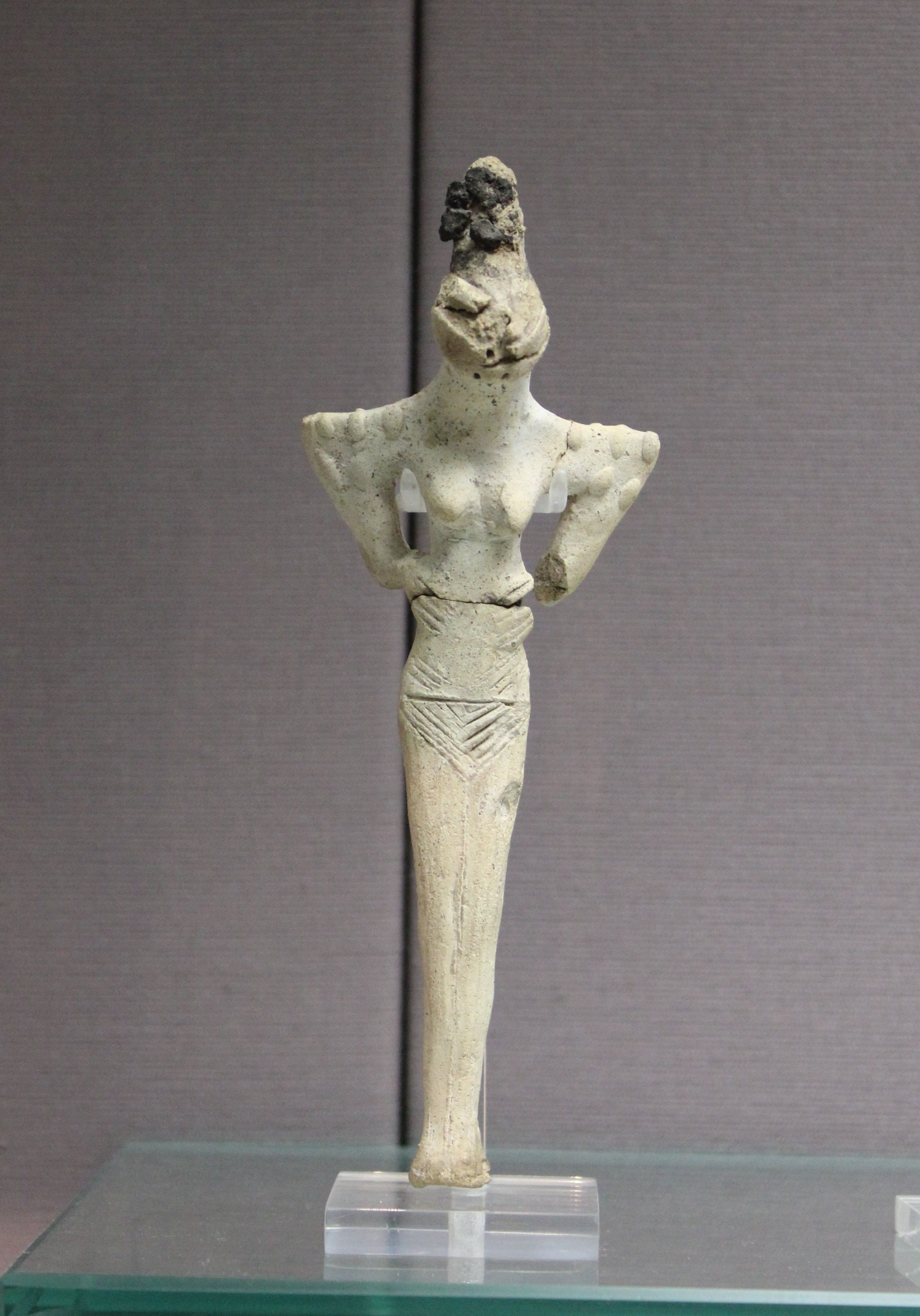
Female figurine - Ubaid period - Ur

The most prominent discovery at Tell Uquair was the "Painted Temple", a large complex similar in design to the "White Temple" found at Uruk, with alternating buttresses and recesses. The temple was laid directly on the bitumen coated platform and was eventually fully cleaned and filled with mudbricks before a later temple. Like that temple it was tripartite and had stepped niches with half columns. Like the White Temple it was also later filled in with large rectangular bricks and a surface prepared for a new building which has not survived. Some of the original frescoes were still visible at the time of the excavation and were copied. Several frescoes were recovered intact and sent to the Baghdad Museum. The temple is believed to date to the Uruk or early Jemdet Nasr period. A small adjacent Jemdet Nasr temple, built with Riemchen bricks, was of somewhat later construction and contained large amounts of pottery from that period.

It has been suggested, based on a toponym (ḪA.ÚR.BAR), that the Blau Monuments originated at Tell Uqair.

== Urum ==
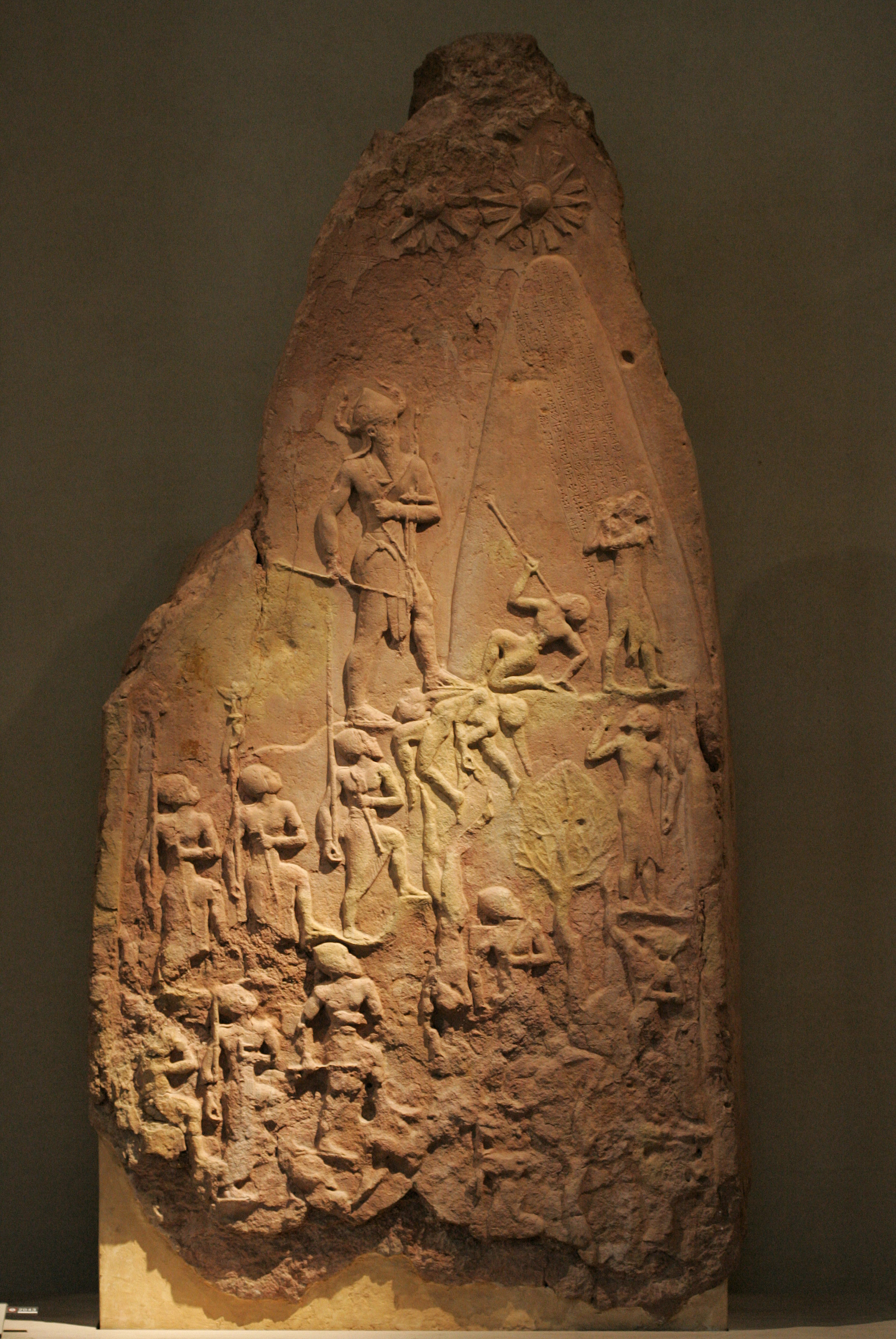
Victory stele of Naram Sin 9068

Because of clay tablets found at the site and its areal location, Tell Uqair has been proposed as the ancient town of Urum. The toponym for Urum is written in cuneiform as ÚR×Ú.KI (cuneiform: 𒌱𒆠), URUM_{4} = ÚR×ḪA (cuneiform: 𒌯), besides ÚR×A.ḪA.KI (cuneiform: 𒌬𒆠), from earlier (pre-Ur III) ÚR.A.ḪA.

It is known that during the 3rd millennium BC Urum was a cult site for the god Nanna. It is also known that Urum was between the cities of Kish and Sippar (more specifically between Sippar and Kutha), which fits with Tell Uqair, and that under the Ur III empire one of the ensi_{2} was one Ur-Sin/Ur-Suena (attested in years 43 and 44 of Shulgi). At that time Urum and TiWA/Tiwe, which was known as one of the polities that joined the great rebellion against Naram-Sin of Akkad (c. 2254–2218 BC), made up adjacent Ur III provinces. In a text of Naram-Sin, on the pivotal battle in crushing the revolt, he states "In between the cities of TiWA and Urum, in the field of the god Sin, he drew up (battle lines) and awaited battle.". It is known that Urum was the third most province from the north, after Sippar and then Tiwe, of the 19 provinces of Ur III.

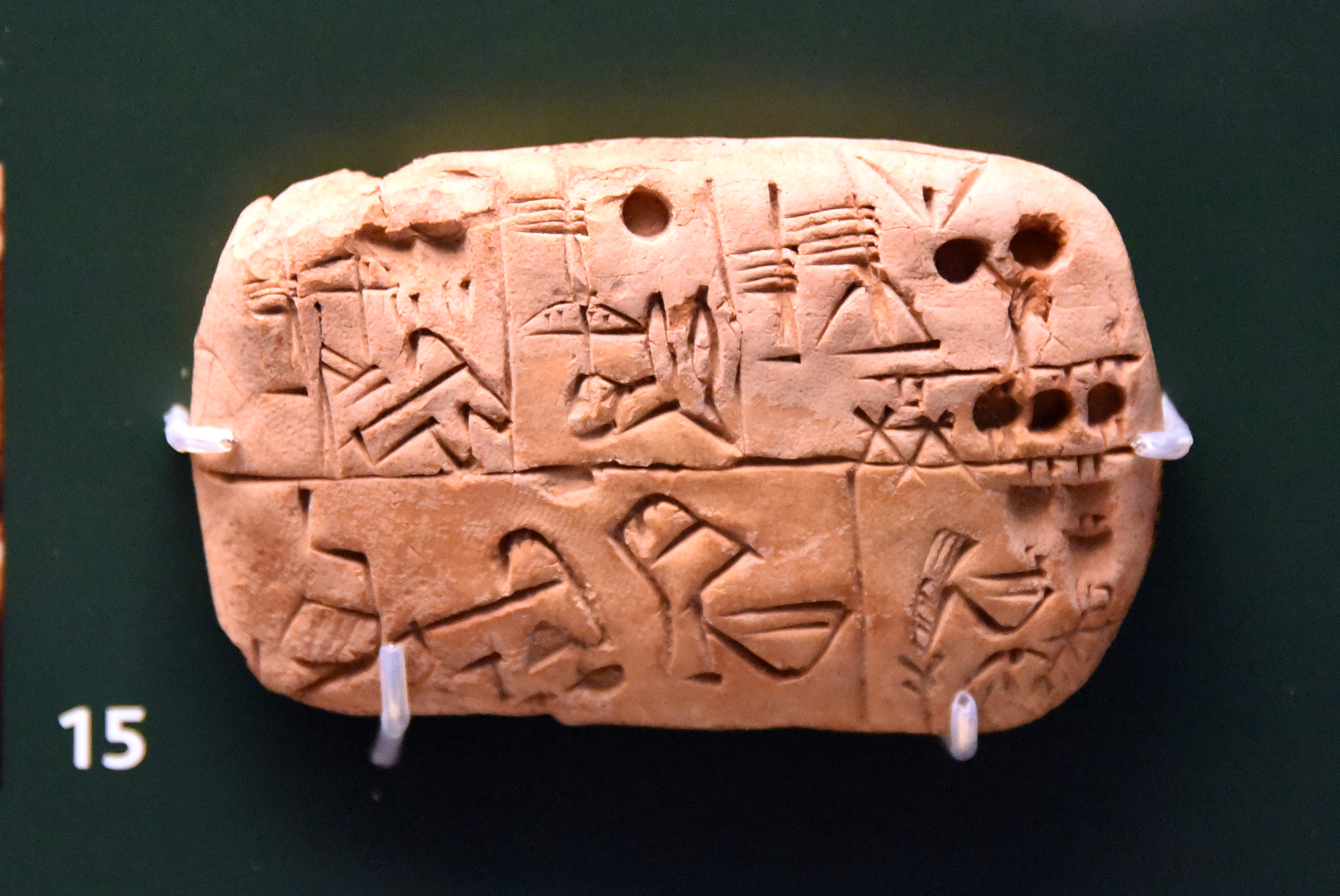
Proto-cuneiform tablet, late Uruk period

The goddess Ningal had a sanctuary at Urum. According to the Sumerian Temple Hymns, the temple of Nanna at Urum was named E-Ablua.

Tulid-Šamši (Šamaš-gave-(me-)birth) was an en-priestess of Nanna at Urum during the reign of Ur III ruler Shu-Sin (c. 2037–2028 BC), known from seals of two servants. She is also listed as en ^{d}EN.ZU. A Niridagal was general in charge of the troops of Urum and Tiwa (A.HA) in the reign of Amar-Sin (c. 2046–2037BC). A text from the reign of Ibbi-Sin (c. 2028–2004 BC) mentions "when the en of Nanna of Urum was installed" (u4 en-dnanna ÚRxÚ.KI-ka ba-hun-gá).

It has been proposed that in Old Babylonian times the name of Urum was Elip. Elip is known from the year names of Babylonian rulers, Sumu-abum year 2 "Year the city wall of Elip was seized", Apil-Sin year 9 "Year the temple of Inanna in Elip was built", and Hammu-rabi year 17 "Year in which Hammu-rabi the king elevated a statue for Inanna of Elip". The city was the capitol of the still obscure Manana Dynasty which ruled the city of Kish for a time.

== See also ==
- Ancient City Seals
- Cities of the ancient Near East
- List of Mesopotamian dynasties
- List of Mesopotamian deities
- Chronology of the ancient Near East
