= Liste der archaischen Keilschriftzeichen =

Dictionary of Sumerian cuneiform signs

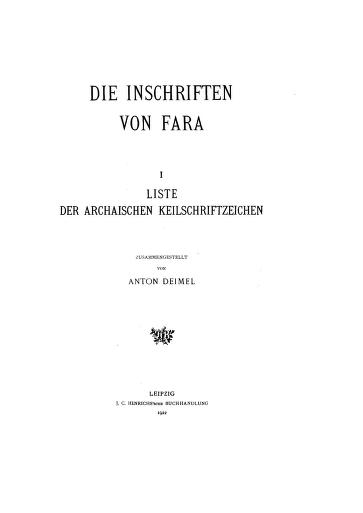
- Author: Anton Deimel
- Publication date: 1922

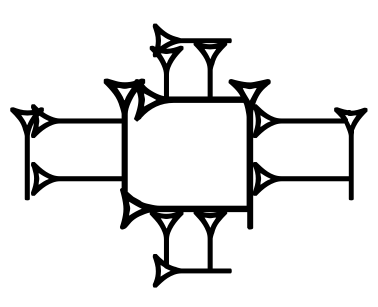
LAK-617 (U+12501), a sign in the shape of five boxes arranged as a cross; it is used as a compositional element, the central box being used as a container for an additional sign in LAK-618 to LAK-627. LAK-617 on its own also had an (unknown) phonetic value, used in the spelling of a theonym read as ^{d}Nin-[LAK-617]-la.

Liste der archaischen Keilschriftzeichen (German: [ˈlɪstə deːɐ̯ ʔaʁˈçaːɪʃn̩ ˈkaɪlʃʁɪftˌtsaɪçn̩]; "list of archaic cuneiform signs"), abbreviated LAK, is a dictionary of Sumerian cuneiform signs of the Fara period (Early Dynastic IIIa, c. 25th century BC short chronology, 26th century BC middle chronology), published in 1922 by German sumerologist and theologian P. Anton Deimel (1865–1954). The list enumerates 870 distinct cuneiform signs.

The sign inventory in the archaic period was considerably larger than the standard inventory of the later Akkadian (2350 to 2100) or Neo-Sumerian (Ur III) (21st century; all dates short chronology) periods. This means that numerous signs identified by their classical reading continue several distinct signs of the pre-classical period. If it is necessary to identify the pre-classical sign intended, its LAK number is customarily given, in the form of LAK-1 to LAK-870.

Deimel also published a Sumerian dictionary (Šumerisches Lexikon) in 1928.

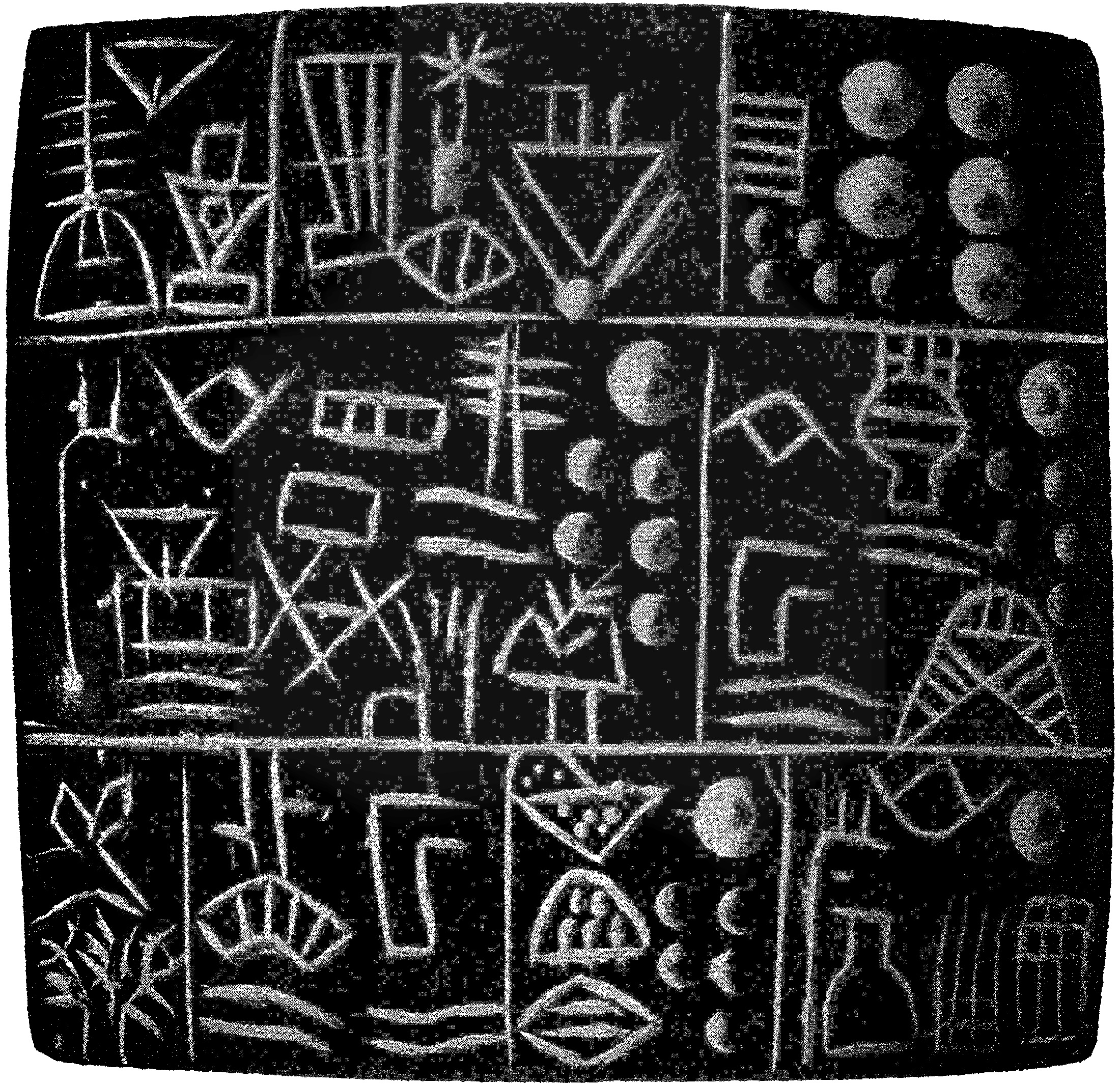
Proto-cuneiform tablet, Jemdet Nasr period, c. 3100–2900 BC.

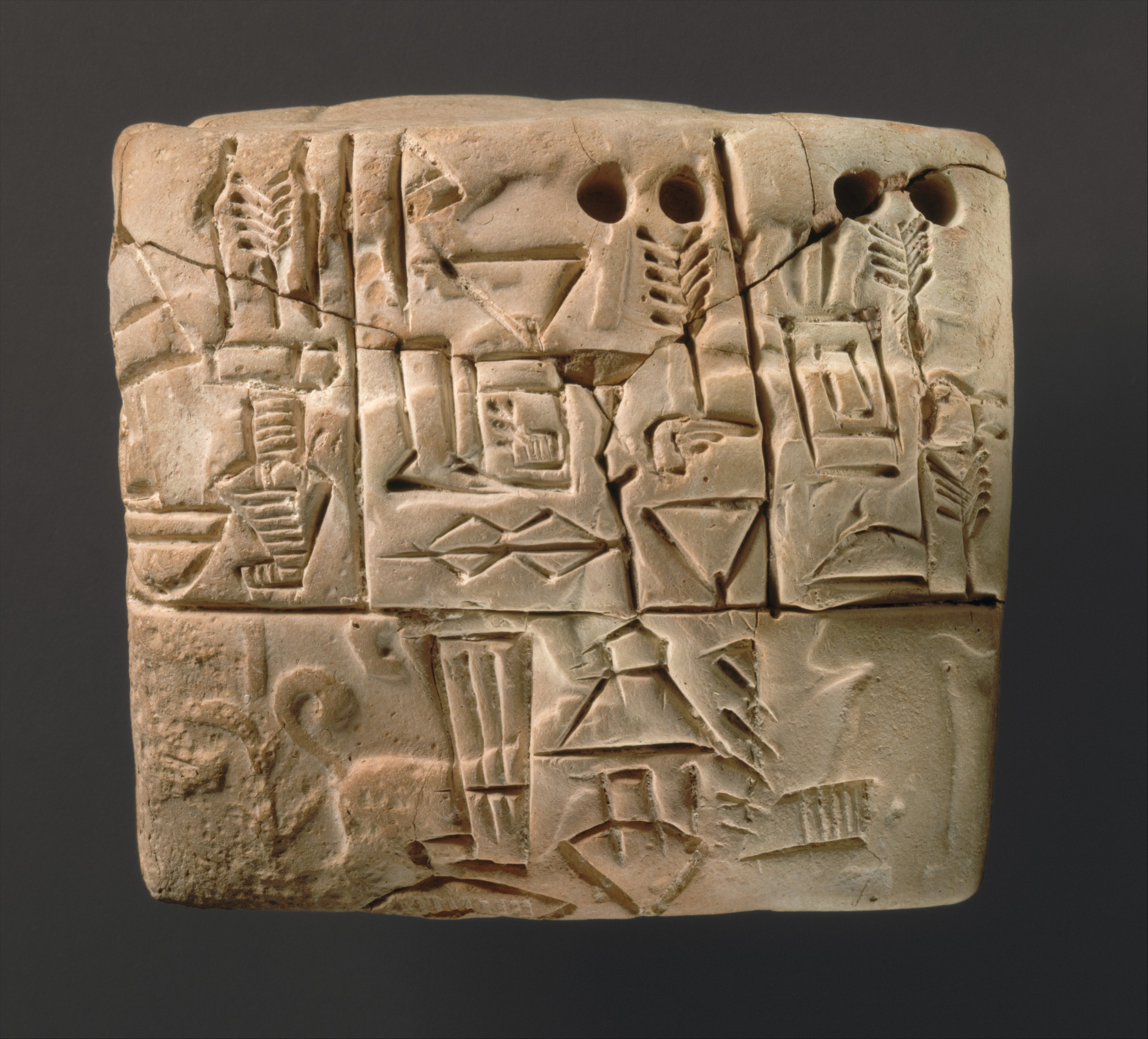
Proto-cuneiform tablet, Jemdet Nasr period, c. 3100–2900 BC. A dog on a leash is visible in the background of the lower panel.

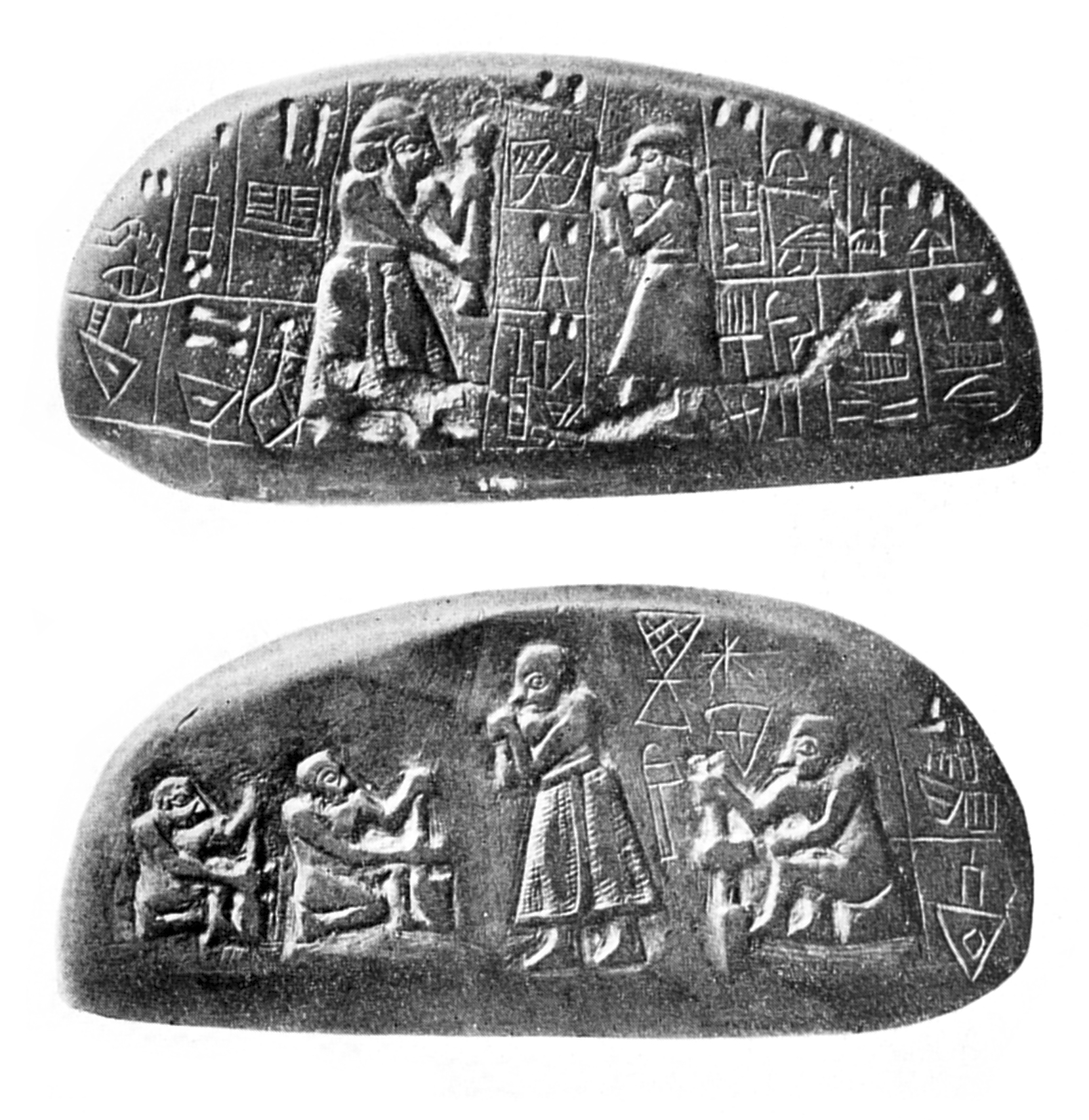
The Blau Monuments combine proto-cuneiform characters and illustrations, 3100–2700 BC. British Museum.

== See also ==
- List of cuneiform signs
- Early Dynastic Cuneiform
