= Deimel =

Deimel is a German surname. Notable people with the surname include:

- Anton Deimel, German sumerologist and theologian who published Liste der archaischen Keilschriftzeichen
- Claus Deimel, German ethnologist
- Daniel Deimel, German social worker, health scientist and addiction researcher
- Jens Deimel, German Nordic combined skier
- Theodor Deimel, Austrian Catholic theologian, patristician and local historian
- Ulrich Olaf Deimel, German artist
