= Blau Monuments =

Mesopotamian inscribed stone objects

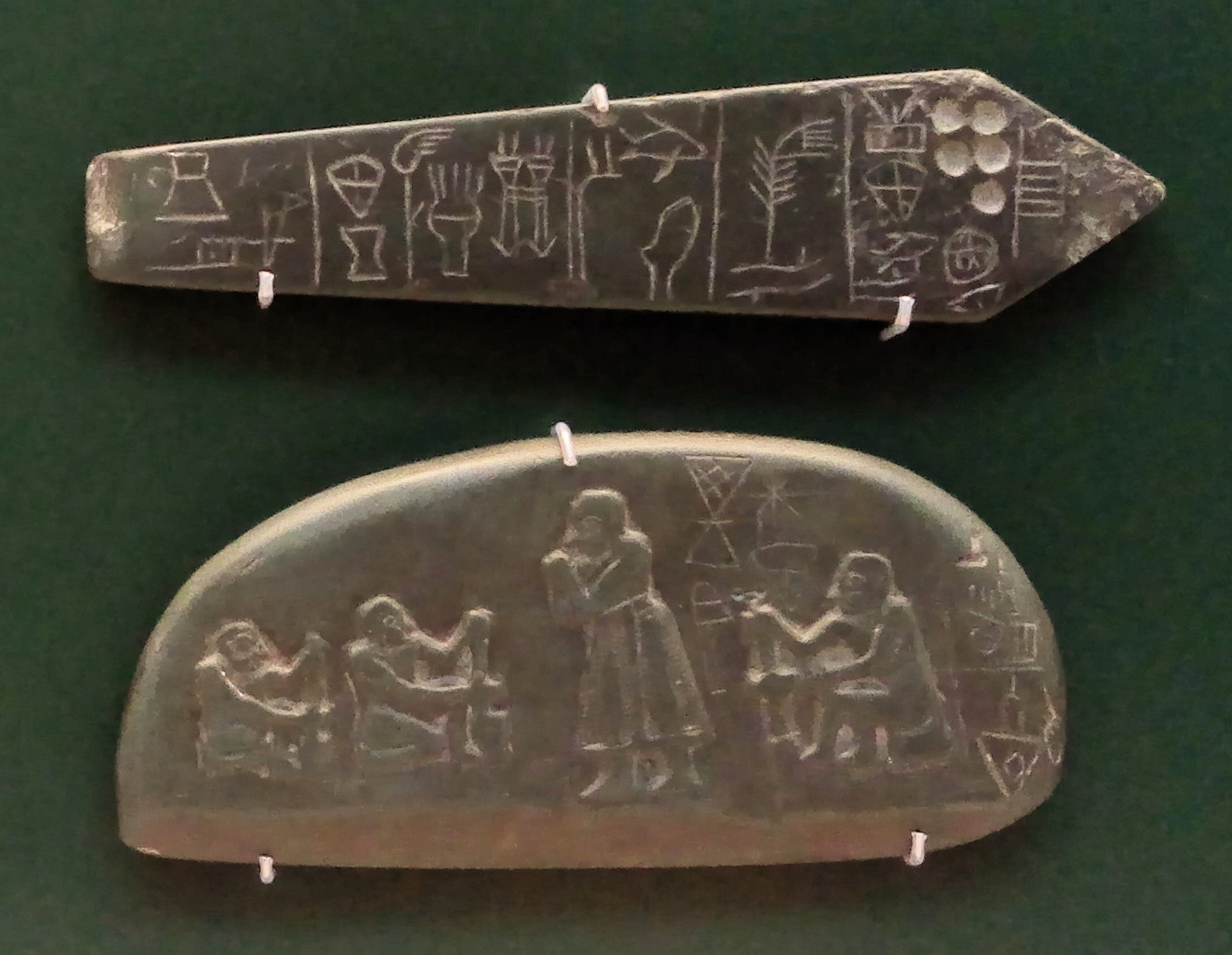
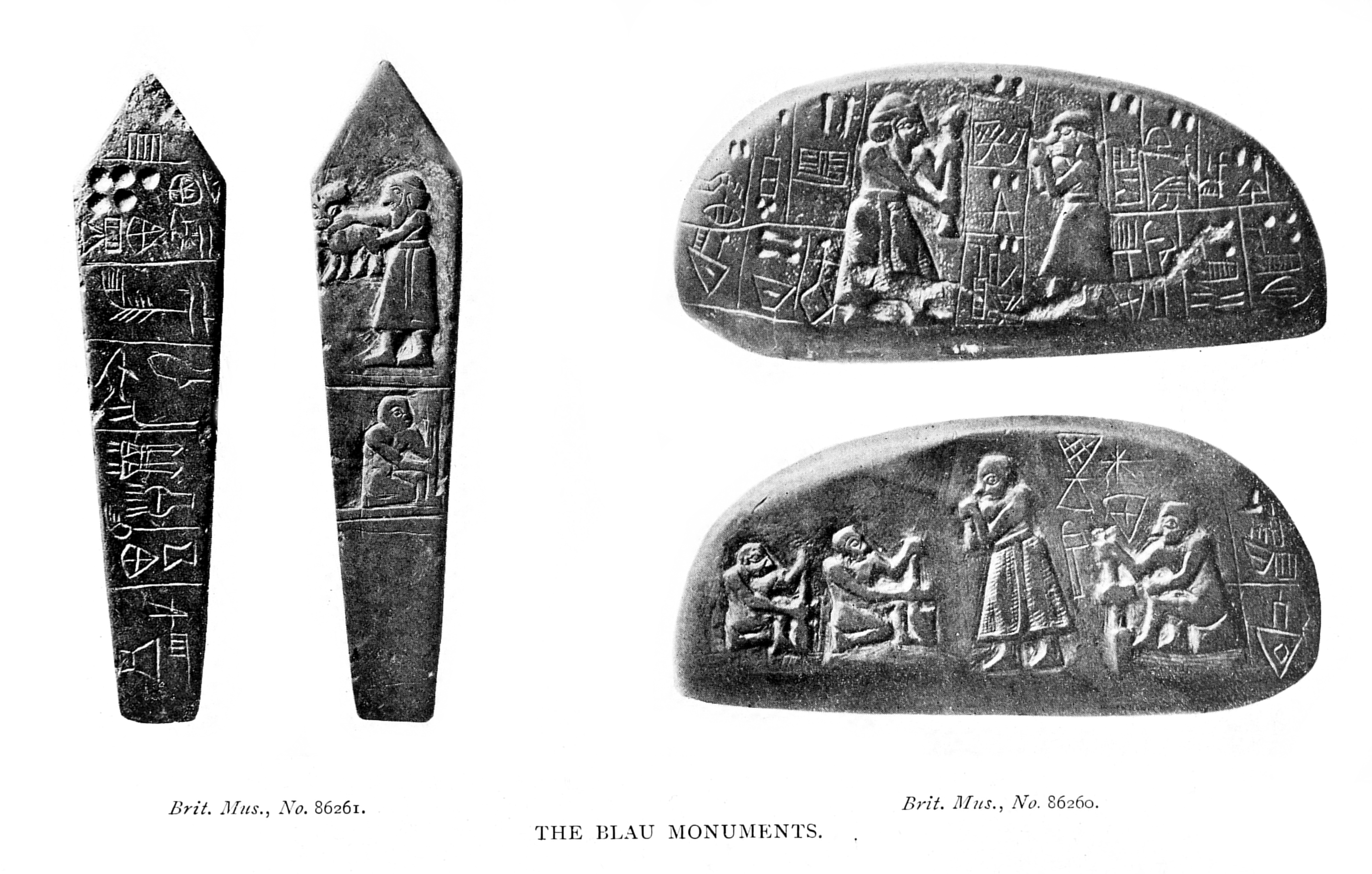
- The Blau Monuments, British Museum
- Material: Gypsum
- Size: 96.5 cm long
- Created: 3100-2700 BC
- Present location: British Museum, London
- Registration: 1899,0418

Location

The Blau Monuments ("Blau’sche Steine") are a pair of inscribed stone objects from Mesopotamia now in the British Museum. They are commonly thought to be a form of ancient kudurru (boundary marker stone).

== History ==
The Monuments were purchased by A. Blau in 1886 near the city of Uruk (modern-day Iraq). They were eventually acquired by the British Museum. They were carved of bright blue stone commonly regarded as a dark shale or kind of schist. Thought to be forgeries for some time, excavations at Uruk redeemed them through revealing stylistic parallels in a basalt stele and the famous Warka Vase. Some assyriologists accepted the Monuments’ authenticity as early as 1901, although this was not a universal belief. Even though widely accepted today, some authors nonetheless maintain scrutiny on the Monuments’ status.

== Dating ==
The Blau Monuments are dated within the Uruk III/Jemdet Nasr to Early Dynastic I period. Some authors date the pair as early as 3100 BC on the basis of the Early Cuneiform script, while others date them to the ED I period around 2700 BC because of other stylistically similar land sale records with a definite date in the ED I period. Both dates are equally represented in scholarly works; the majority of works citing the earliest date usually reference Gelb in their turn.

== Imagery ==
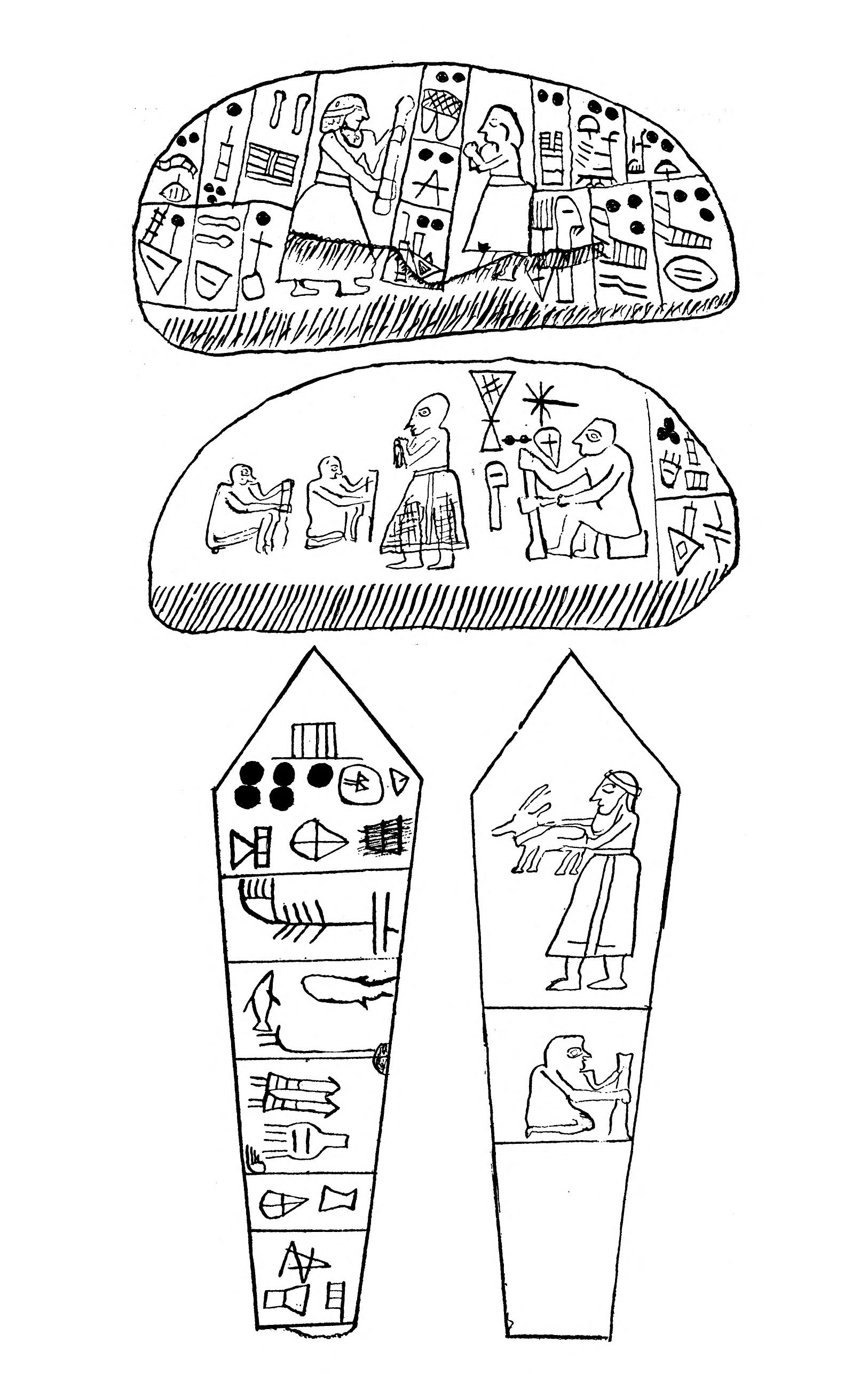
Blau Monuments (drawing)

The iconography on the Monuments is a matter of some dispute, upon which even recent scholars cannot wholly agree. Throughout their history, it has been consistently believed that the Monuments represented some form of transaction, usually in the form of a gift from a temple to its craftsmen. More recently, the imagery has been taken to represent a ceremonial feast given by a new land-owner after a land purchase.

=== Obelisk (BM 86261) ===
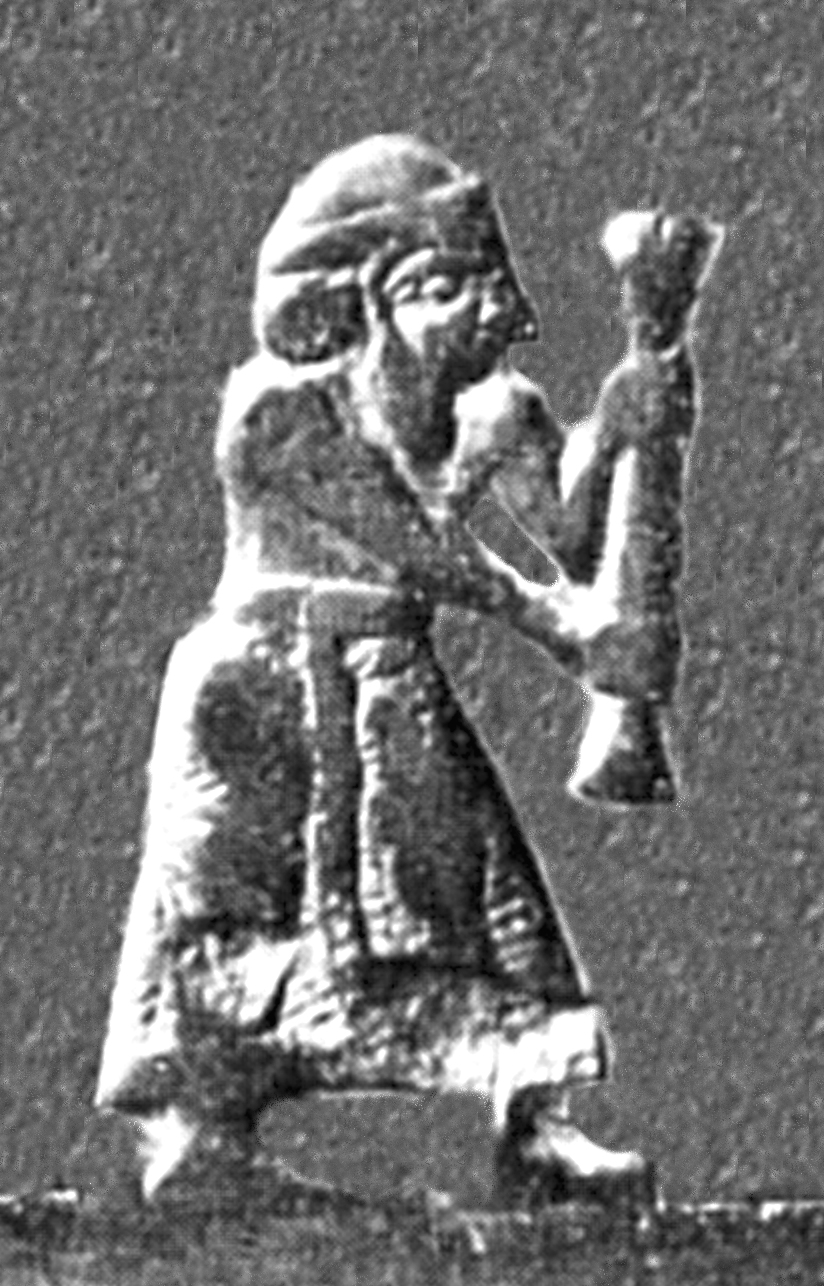
The "Priest King" as he appears on the scraper of the Blau Monuments.

The obelisk (18 cm × 4.3 cm × 1.3 cm) shows male forms in two separate registers. The lower figure is a nude male who kneels with a pestle and mortar, which could suggest equally craftsmen or food preparation. He has parallels on the Warka Vase, where likewise nude males carry baskets of food for religious purposes.

In the upper register, a standing man with a beard, bordered net-skirt, and headband holds a four-legged animal in his hands (usually identified as either a sheep or a goat). This figure is a very common way throughout Mesopotamian art of depicting a male with power. This is generally considered as a depiction of a "Priest-King".

=== Plaque (BM 86260) ===
The obverse of the plaque (15.9 cm × 7.2 cm × 1.5 cm) shows a similarly hierarchical scene. The leftmost figure is another bearded, skirted man. He holds a long object with both hands. This object has been interpreted as a pestle or a land-sale cone; when compared to the workers elsewhere on the Monuments who are working with pestles, the former identification seems unlikely. This is generally considered as another depiction of the "Priest-King". The "Priest King" appears on numerous works of art of the period, and even on a prehistoric Egyptian knife, the Gebel el-Arak Knife, suggesting Egypt-Mesopotamia relations at the time.

Most texts identify the right figure as a woman on the basis of Gelb's identification, but if so, then ‘she’ lacks the characteristic dress present on other women from the same period, such as on the Ushumgal Stele. The reverse shows four men. Two are nude workers, kneeling with pestles and mortars. Between them stands a bald man wearing a net skirt. He holds his hands up like the smaller figure on the obverse. The remaining figure sits to the right, and appears nearly identical to the workers except slightly larger. This evidently depicts the process of food preparation for the feast.

== Inscriptions ==
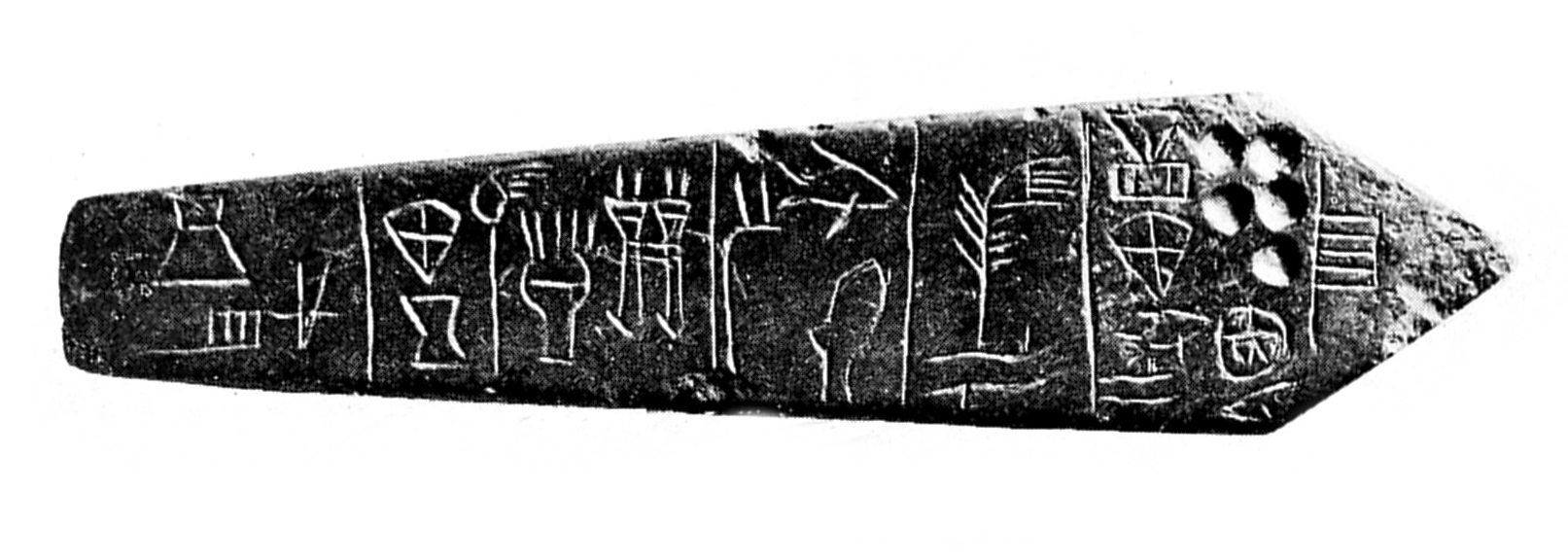
Blau Monument Early Cuneiform characters

Like the Stele of Ushumgal and other works from a similar time period, the text on the Blau Monuments is not fully comprehensible. Certain signs are readily identified, while others have no known identification. The obelisk's inscription clearly refers to "5 bur" of land (roughly 30 hectares), as well as a temple household and the profession "engar". This title refers to a high official in an agricultural field, which would suggest the presence of an individual able to undertake such a transaction. The plaque's text lists commodities of many sorts, as well as several other names and additional undeciphered information. The assumption, then, is that these items were exchanged for the land on the obelisk.

== Controversy ==
As a result of the yet-undeciphered text and certain oddities in the iconography, any attempt at definitively declaring a purpose for the Monuments is naturally tenuous. The Monuments are two of only five “ancient kudurrus” listed by Gelb (a classification currently in dispute). Consequently, they resist classification, and such a task is certainly not aided by the lack of definite information on their use.
