= Robert Keith Englund =

American archaeologist (1952–2020)

Robert K. Englund
- Born: March 29, 1952; Bellingham, Washington, United States
- Died: May 24, 2020 (aged 68)
- Education: University of Washington; University of California, Berkeley; University of Chicago; LMU Munich
- Known for: The Cuneiform Digital Library Initiative (CDLI)
- Awards: 2004 Lyman Award
- Scientific career
- Fields: Assyriology, Archaeology
- Workplaces: Free University of Berlin; University of California, Los Angeles

Robert K. Englund (29 March 1952 – 24 May 2020) was an American Archaeologist and Assyriologist.

== Biography ==
Robert Keith Englund was born in Bellingham, Washington; attended high school in Yakima, WA; and enrolled in mathematics at the University of Washington in 1970. He quit in 1972 to travel the world (supporting himself through jobs such as carpentry), then enrolled at the University of California, Berkeley (1974) where he completed a BA in Near Eastern Studies in 1977. After a year of graduate work at the University of Chicago, he transferred to LMU Munich, where he completed his PhD dissertation "Verwaltung und Organisation der Ur III-Fischerei (The Administration and Organization of Ur III Fisheries)" under advisor Dietz Otto Edzard. The thesis analyzed accounting in the Ur III period Third Dynasty of Ur in the third millennium BC to provide economics-based insight into the organization of state-dependent workers and supervisors in fisheries. After post-doctoral research and teaching at the Free University of Berlin, he began a faculty position at the University of California, Los Angeles, in 1996. He retired in 2018 to Guemes Island in Washington State with his wife Klaudia Maria Englund and was active in the Cuneiform Digital Library Initiative (CDLI). According to the UCLA department of Near Eastern Languages & Cultures news feed, professor Englund died May 24, 2020, after a long struggle with cancer. He was sixty-eight years old.

== Research ==
Englund was a specialist on the texts of the early Uruk period (c. 3300–2900 BC). His work includes analyses of more than 2500 Uruk period texts (primarily in ATU 3 (with H.J. Nissen 1993), 5 (1995), 6 (with H.J. Nissen 2005), 7 (with H.J. Nissen 2001), MSVO 1 (with J.P. Grégoire 1991), 3 (with P. Damerow, forthcoming), and 4 (1996)). Englund participated in the 1988 season of archaeological work at Jemdet Nasr directed by Roger Matthews. Englund also published the 27 proto-Elamite tablets from Tepe Yahya in Iran's Fars province with Peter Damerow (1989) and led research in the origins and development of early writing in Iran throughout the 1990s and early 2000s. Continuing the work of Swedish mathematician Jöran Friberg, Englund and Damerow deciphered the numerical systems of the proto-Elamite writing system and showed the dependency of proto-Elamite on the texts from the Late Uruk period. His 2004 study, “The State of Decipherment of Proto-Elamite,” led to the renewed efforts at deciphering this early Iranian writing system, making use of graphotactics in the study of early writing systems, but hampered by the lack of reliable copies hindering this same progress. Englund supported later work aimed at producing high definition images of all the proto-Elamite tablets through his work on the CDLI (below). His analysis of the economic and administrative history of the Ur III empire (c. 2100–2000 BC) are foundational, and the period was his scholarly passion. His writings are often punctuated by social commentary.

Englund was a principal investigator of the project Cuneiform Digital Library Initiative (CDLI), Los Angeles/Oxford/Berlin, with a concentration on Proto-Cuneiform texts from late 4th millennium BC Mesopotamia. He served as editor to the online Cuneiform Digital Library Journal and Bulletin (CDLJ&B).

Englund began the Cuneiform Digital Library Initiative (CDLI) in 1998. Scaling to an international team of Assyriologists, museum curators, historians of science, and with adequate funding beginning in 2000, the CDLI's mission is to create an online library of hundreds of thousands of recovered cuneiform tablets and other artifacts, scanned by CDLI staff and partners, from the fourth millennium BC to the pre-Christian period. The CDLI has preserved historical texts from destruction, including from looting, war, and terrorism. The large datasets have allowed the use of big-data machine learning analysis.

== Teaching ==
Englund taught in the Humanities Division Department of Near Eastern Languages and Cultures at UCLA. Giving regular lectures on the history and civilizations of the Ancient Near East, Englund also taught Sumerian and Akkadian and numerous seminars on diverse topics. "Frühe Schrift und Techniken der Wirtschaftsverwaltung im alten Vorderen Orient" and its translation to English "Archaic Bookkeeping," are widely used as textbooks in undergraduate and graduate programs in universities across the world. With UCLA Computer Science graduate students Sai Deep Tetali and Prashant Rajput, Englund developed free educational apps “cdli tablet” for the iOS and Android phone and tablet platforms. "cdli tablet" combines "text and images of ancient Mesopotamia that span 3500 years of human activity and describe the roots of trade, mathematics, and astronomy in ancient times, that follow the application of lex talionis by Hammurapi, and that bring to life the exploits of Gilgamesh and Enkidu."

== Honors and awards ==
- 2004 Lyman Award

== Selection of Publications ==
- Robert K. Englund. Organisation and Verwaltung der Ur III-Fischerei (=Berliner Beiträge zum Vorderen Orient 10; Berlin 1990) ( PDF copy)
- Bauer, Josef, Robert K. Englund, and Manfred Krebernik. Mesopotamien: Späturuk-Zeit und Frühdynastische Zeit Orbis Biblicus et Orientalis 160/1; Freiburg, Switzerland, 1998 ( PDF copy of “Late Uruk”; 160/1 doi)
- Damerow, Peter, and Robert K. Englund, with an introduction by C. C. Lamberg-Karlovsky. The Proto-Elamite Texts from Tepe Yahya (=American School of Prehistoric Research Bulletin 39; Cambridge, Mass., 1989, ^{2}2003 ( PDF copy)
- Nissen, Hans J., Damerow, Peter, and Robert K. Englund. Frühe Schrift und Techniken der Wirtschaftsverwaltung im alten Vorderen Orient (Berlin 1990, ^{2}1991, ^{3}2004)
- Archaic Bookkeeping (Chicago 1993; revised English edition of Frühe Schrift)
- “Equivalency Values and the Command Economy of the Ur III Period in Mesopotamia,” in J. Papadopoulos & G. Urton, eds., The Construction of Value in the Ancient World (Los Angeles 2012) 427-458 (PDF copy)
- Damerow, Peter, Robert K. Englund, and Hans J. Nissen. “Die Entstehung der Schrift,” Spektrum der Wissenschaft, February 1988, 74-85 (reprinted in: J. Dittami, ed., Signale und Kommunikation [Heidelberg/Berlin/Oxford 1993] 150–161, and B. Riese, ed., Sprache und Schrift: Ein Lesebuch [= Verständliche Forschung; Heidelberg/Berlin/Oxford, 1994] 90–101) (PDF copy)
- Link to Google Scholar Publications
