= Humanist Internet Discussion Group =

The Humanist discussion group may refer to:

- Humanist (electronic seminar), a long-running (since 1987) e-mail discussion group on humanities computing
- a discussion list (since 2003) run by the Council of Australian Humanist Societies
