= Cuneiform (Unicode block) =

- Range: U+12000..U+123FF (1,024 code points)
- Plane: SMP
- Scripts: Cuneiform
- Major alphabets: Sumerian; Akkadian; Elamite; Hittite; Hurrian
- Assigned: 922 code points
- Unused: 102 reserved code points

Unicode Version History
- 5.0 (2006): 879 (+879)
- 7.0 (2014): 921 (+42)
- 8.0 (2015): 922 (+1)

Unicode documentation
- Code chart ∣ Web page

In Unicode, the Sumero-Akkadian Cuneiform script is covered in the following blocks in the Supplementary Multilingual Plane (SMP):

- U+12000–U+123FF Cuneiform
- U+12400–U+1247F Cuneiform Numbers and Punctuation
- U+12480–U+1254F Early Dynastic Cuneiform
- U+12550–U+1268F Archaic Cuneiform Numerals

The sample glyphs in the chart file published by the Unicode Consortium show the characters in their Classical Sumerian form (Early Dynastic period, mid 3rd millennium BC). The characters as written during the 2nd and 1st millennia BC, during which the vast majority of cuneiform texts were written, are considered font variants of the same characters.

== Character inventory and ordering ==
The final proposal for Unicode encoding of the script was submitted by two cuneiform scholars working with an experienced Unicode proposal writer in June 2004. The base character inventory is derived from the list of Ur III signs compiled by the Cuneiform Digital Library Initiative of UCLA based on the inventories of Miguel Civil, Rykle Borger (2003), and Robert Englund. Rather than opting for a direct ordering by glyph shape and complexity, according to the numbering of an existing catalogue, the Unicode order of glyphs was based on the Latin alphabetic order of their 'main' Sumerian transliteration as a practical approximation.

Of the 907 signs listed by Borger (2003), some 200 have no encoding at a single code point. Conversely, a number of combinations considered reducible by Borger were assigned unique code points. These differences are due to the difficulty of establishing what represents a single character in cuneiform, and indeed most of Borger's items not encoded have straightforward etymological decomposition. There are still quite a number of universally recognized signs missing, and criticism has been voiced to the effect that the encoding "disregards an important part of the accumulated knowledge of generations of assyriologists about what actually function as single signs in normal texts, and are reflected in the traditional sign lists, most recently and comprehensively Borger's Mesopotamische Zeichenliste". For example, there are signs written as ligatures of varying constituent signs, such as KURUM_{7} (Borger 2003 no. 729) that was written IGI.NÍG in early times, but later IGI.ERIM. Since there is no code point for KURUM_{7}, the sign must be expressed as either IGI.NÍG (U+12146 U+1243C, 𒅆𒐼) or IGI.ERIM (U+12146 U+1209F, 𒅆𒂟) depending on the shape of the glyph, in violation of the basic principle of Unicode to encode characters, not glyphs. While those signs can in principle still be added by a "Cuneiform Extended" range in the future, as has been done for a number of other scripts ("Latin Extended" etc.), their absence as of Unicode 7.0 means that the standard's usability for the encoding of actual texts is limited.

Rather than opting for an ordering by glyph shape and complexity, the Unicode order of characters is the Latin alphabet order of their "main" Sumerian transliteration (placing signs on Š-, transliterated as SH-, between SAR and SI). In most (but not all) cases, the "etymological" decomposition of originally complex signs ("ligatures") has been chosen, even if the sign's most familiar value is another. For example, U+12066 𒁦 CUNEIFORM SIGN DAG KISIM5 TIMES LU PLUS MASH2 is better known as AMAŠ, U+12258 𒉘 CUNEIFORM SIGN NINDA2 TIMES NE is better known as ÁG, and U+1212F 𒄯 CUNEIFORM SIGN HI TIMES ASH2 is better known as ḪAR or ḪUR.

== List of signs ==
The following table allows matching of Borger's 1981 and 2003 numbering with Unicode characters The "primary" transliteration column has the glyphs' Sumerian values as given by the official glyph name, slightly modified here for legibility by including traditional assyriological symbols such as "x" rather than "TIMES". The exact Unicode names can be unambiguously recovered by prefixing, "CUNEIFORM [NUMERIC] SIGN", replacing "TIMES" for "x", "PLUS" for "+" and "OVER" for "/", "ASTERISK" for "*", "H" for "Ḫ", "SH" for "Š", and switching to uppercase.

== Sumero-Akkadian Cuneiform ==
Sign	Code point	"Primary" transliteration	Borger (2003)	Borger (1981)	Comments
𒀀	U+12000	A	839	579	DU_{23}
𒀁	U+12001	A x A	845	583	EDURU
𒀂	U+12002	A x BAD	840	580	AGAM
𒀃	U+12003	A x GAN_{2} tenû			
𒀄	U+12004	A x ḪA	846	584; 587	ZAḪ_{3}
𒀅	U+12005	A x IGI	844	581	ÍR
𒀆	U+12006	A x LAGAR gunû	843	582	
𒀇	U+12007	A x MUŠ	842		
𒀈	U+12008	A x SAG	841	585	
𒀉	U+12009	A_{2}	560	334	ED, ID
𒀊	U+1200A	AB	223	128	ABBA, EŠ_{3}
𒀋	U+1200B	AB x AŠ_{2}	227	128**,200a	
𒀌	U+1200C	AB x DUN_{3} gunû			
𒀍	U+1200D	AB x GAL	228	194	IRIGAL
𒀎	U+1200E	AB x GAN_{2} tenû	225	198	
𒀏	U+1200F	AB x ḪA	236	200	NINA
𒀐	U+12010	AB x IGI gunû	229	196	
𒀑	U+12011	AB x IMIN	237		
𒀒	U+12012	AB x LAGAB	234		
𒀓	U+12013	AB x ŠEŠ	226	200c	
𒀔	U+12014	AB x U + U + U	232		UNUG
𒀕	U+12015	AB gunû			ÚNU, URUGAL_{2}
𒀖	U+12016	AB_{2}	672	420	LID
𒀗	U+12017	AB_{2} x BALAG	676	422	LILIZ
𒀘	U+12018	AB_{2} x GAN_{2} tenû	674	423	KIR_{6}
𒀙	U+12019	AB_{2} x ME + EN	679	426	
𒀚	U+1201A	AB_{2} x ŠA_{3}	677	424	LIBIŠ
𒀛	U+1201B	AB_{2} x TAK_{4}	673	420,8	
𒀜	U+1201C	AD	258	145	ADDA
𒀝	U+1201D	AK	127	97	AG
𒀞	U+1201E	AK x ERIN_{2}	129	98	ME_{3}
𒀟	U+1201F	AK x ŠITA + GIŠ	128		
𒀠	U+12020	AL	474	298	
𒀡	U+12021	AL x AL	478		
𒀢	U+12022	AL x DIM_{2}	480		
𒀣	U+12023	AL x GIŠ	477	301	
𒀤	U+12024	AL x ḪA	482	305	
𒀥	U+12025	AL x KAD_{3}			
𒀦	U+12026	AL x KI	481	303	
𒀧	U+12027	AL x ŠE	348,479	205	IL
𒀨	U+12028	AL x UŠ	476	300	
𒀩	U+12029	ALAN	573	358	
𒀪	U+1202A	aleph	635	397	late variant of AḪ; HZL nr. 332
𒀫	U+1202B	AMAR	695	437	ZUR
𒀬	U+1202C	AMAR x ŠE	696	438	SISKUR
𒀭	U+1202D	AN	010	13	
𒀮	U+1202E	AN / AN			
𒀯	U+1202F	AN three times			MUL
𒀰	U+12030	AN + NAGA opposing AN + NAGA			
𒀱	U+12031	AN + NAGA squared			^{D}NAGA, DALḪAMUN
𒀲	U+12032	ANŠE	353	208	"donkey"
𒀳	U+12033	APIN	090	56	ÀBSIN, ENGAR
𒀴	U+12034	ARAD	0018	50	NITA_{2}
𒀵	U+12035	ARAD x KUR	0019	51	
𒀶	U+12036	ARKAB	859v		NIG_{2}.IB, ARGAB
𒀷	U+12037	ASAL_{2}			
𒀸	U+12038	AŠ	001	001	also DIŠ, DILI, DIDLI (plural)
𒀹	U+12039	AŠ ZIDA tenû	575	209	DIŠ tenû, ĜE_{23}
𒀺	U+1203A	AŠ KABA tenû	647?		
𒀻	U+1203B	AŠ / AŠ TUG_{2} / TUG_{2} TUG_{2} / TUG_{2} PAP			
𒀼	U+1203C	AŠ / AŠ / AŠ	505	325*	EŠ_{16}, "THREE", "3"
𒀽	U+1203D	AŠ / AŠ / AŠ crossing AŠ / AŠ / AŠ	649	364/5,5-6	ŠUŠUR_{2}
𒀾	U+1203E	AŠ_{2}	548	339	
𒀿	U+1203F	AŠGAB	173	6	
𒁀	U+12040	BA	014	005	BA.BA.ZA = "porridge"
𒁁	U+12041	BAD	113	69	BA_{9}, MUD_{2}
𒁂	U+12042	BAG_{3}		78	
𒁃	U+12043	BAḪAR_{2}		309	
𒁄	U+12044	BAL	005	9	
𒁅	U+12045	BAL / BAL			
𒁆	U+12046	BALAG	565	352	DUB_{2}
𒁇	U+12047	BAR	121	74	
𒁈	U+12048	BARA_{2}	554	344	BARAG
𒁉	U+12049	BI	358	214	BE_{2}, BIZ, EBIR_{2}, EPIR_{2}, GAŠ, KA_{8}, KAS_{2}, KAṢ_{2}, KAŠ, PE_{2}, PI_{2}, SA_{18}, SIRIS_{4}, SU_{15}, ŠA_{21}, ŠU_{13}
𒁊	U+1204A	BI x A			
𒁋	U+1204B	BI x GAR	361	214c	
𒁌	U+1204C	BI x IGI gunû			
𒁍	U+1204D	BU	580	371	GID_{2}
𒁎	U+1204E	BU / BU AB	582		
𒁏	U+1204F	BU / BU UN			
𒁐	U+12050	BU crossing BU	581		
𒁑	U+12051	BULUG	169	60	
𒁒	U+12052	BULUG / BULUG			
𒁓	U+12053	BUR	559	349	NIG_{2} gunû
𒁔	U+12054	BUR_{2}	008		DU_{9}
𒁕	U+12055	DA	561	335	DU_{20}
𒁖	U+12056	DAG	438	280	PAR_{3}
𒁗	U+12057	DAG KISIM_{5} x A + MAŠ	461	294b	
𒁘	U+12058	DAG KISIM_{5} x AMAR	458	288	
𒁙	U+12059	DAG KISIM_{5} x BALAG	457		
𒁚	U+1205A	DAG KISIM_{5} x BI	447	288	
𒁛	U+1205B	DAG KISIM_{5} x GA	455	291	UBUR
𒁜	U+1205C	DAG KISIM_{5} x GA + MAŠ			
𒁝	U+1205D	DAG KISIM_{5} x GI	444	284	
𒁞	U+1205E	DAG KISIM_{5} x GIR_{2}	440	281a; 294e; 432,1	KIŠI_{8}
𒁟	U+1205F	DAG KISIM_{5} x GUD	452	289	UTUL_{5}
𒁠	U+12060	DAG KISIM_{5} x ḪA	462	294d	
𒁡	U+12061	DAG KISIM_{5} x IR	450		UBUR_{3}
𒁢	U+12062	DAG KISIM_{5} x IR + LU	451		UBUR_{4}
𒁣	U+12063	DAG KISIM_{5} x KAK	448	294f	
𒁤	U+12064	DAG KISIM_{5} x LA	441	282	
𒁥	U+12065	DAG KISIM_{5} x LU	459		UBUR_{2}
𒁦	U+12066	DAG KISIM_{5} x LU + MAŠ_{2}	460	293; 294	AMAŠ
𒁧	U+12067	DAG KISIM_{5} x LUM	463	294a	
𒁨	U+12068	DAG KISIM_{5} x NE	446	286	
𒁩	U+12069	DAG KISIM_{5} x PAP + PAP			
𒁪	U+1206A	DAG KISIM_{5} x SI	445	285	
𒁫	U+1206B	DAG KISIM_{5} x TAK_{4}	443	283	
𒁬	U+1206C	DAG KISIM_{5} x U_{2} + GIR_{2}	453	290	
𒁭	U+1206D	DAG KISIM_{5} x UŠ	449	287	UTUA
𒁮	U+1206E	DAM	889	557	
𒁯	U+1206F	DAR	183	114	GUN_{3}, ḪUR gunû, SI gunû
𒁰	U+12070	DARA_{3}	166	100	"ibex"
𒁱	U+12071	DARA_{4}	817	540	
𒁲	U+12072	DI	736	457	DE, SA_{2}, SAL_{2}, SI_{8}, SILIM, SILIMA, SIM_{3}, ŚA_{2}, ŠA_{18}, ŠAL_{5}, ŠUB_{3}, ŠUL_{3}, TE_{10}, TI_{4}, ṬE, ṬI
𒁳	U+12073	DIB	813	537	DAB
𒁴	U+12074	DIM	167	94	
𒁵	U+12075	DIM x ŠE	168	94	MUN
𒁶	U+12076	DIM_{2}	686	440	DEM_{2}, DIM_{2}, DIN_{3}, GE_{18}, GEM, GEN_{7}, GI_{18}, GIMI, GIM, GIN_{7}
𒁷	U+12077	DIN	119	465	DAN_{5}, DEN, DINI, DUN_{2}, GURUN_{8}, KURUN_{2}, TEN_{2}, TIM_{3}, TIN, ṬIN
𒁸	U+12078	DIN KASKAL U gunû DIŠ			
𒁹	U+12079	DIŠ	748; 749	480	NIGIDA, "ONE", "1"
𒁺	U+1207A	DU	350	206	ED_{2}, ED_{3}, GUB, RA_{2}, RE_{6}, ŠA_{4}
𒁻	U+1207B	DU / DU	350	206a	LAḪ_{4}, RE_{7}
𒁼	U+1207C	DU gunû	351	201	GIR_{6}, SUḪUŠ
𒁽	U+1207D	DU šešig	352	202	GIR_{5}, KAŠ_{4}
𒁾	U+1207E	DUB	242	138	KIŠIB_{3}
𒁿	U+1207F	DUB x EŠ_{2}			
𒂀	U+12080	DUB_{2}			
𒂁	U+12081	DUG	499	309	BI x A
𒂂	U+12082	DUGUD	704	445	
𒂃	U+12083	DUḪ	298	167	GAB, DU_{8}, TUḪ
𒂄	U+12084	DUN	744	467	ŠUL
𒂅	U+12085	DUN_{3}	836	595	DU_{5}, GÍN, TÙN
𒂆	U+12086	DUN_{3} gunû			
𒂇	U+12087	DUN_{3} gunû gunû			MIR
𒂈	U+12088	DUN_{4}	557	348	DUL_{4}, UR gunû šešig, MIR šešig
𒂉	U+12089	DUR_{2}	808		DURU_{2}, DURUN, TUKUL, TUŠ
𒂊	U+1208A	E	498	308	
𒂋	U+1208B	E x PAP			
𒂌	U+1208C	E / E NUN / NUN			
𒂍	U+1208D	E_{2}	495	324	
𒂎	U+1208E	E_{2} x A + ḪA + DA			
𒂏	U+1208F	E_{2} x GAR			
𒂐	U+12090	E_{2} x MI			
𒂑	U+12091	E_{2} x SAL			
𒂒	U+12092	E_{2} x ŠE			
𒂓	U+12093	E_{2} x U			
𒂔	U+12094	EDIN, E_{2} + DIM x EŠ	300	170	EDEN
𒂕	U+12095	EGIR	356	209	
𒂖	U+12096	EL	899	564	SIKIL
𒂗	U+12097	EN	164	99	
𒂘	U+12098	EN x GAN_{2}	165	54	BURU_{14}
𒂙	U+12099	EN x GAN_{2} tenû			
𒂚	U+1209A	EN x ME	164lig2		
𒂛	U+1209B	EN crossing EN			
𒂜	U+1209C	EN opposing EN			
𒂝	U+1209D	EN squared			
𒂞	U+1209E	EREN	818	541	
𒂟	U+1209F	ERIN_{2}	612; 613	393	ERIM, ZALAG_{2}; PIRIG
𒂠	U+120A0	EŠ_{2}	810; 811	536	ŠE_{3}, GI_{7}, ĜIR_{15}, ZI_{3}, HUĜ
𒂡	U+120A1	EZEN	271	152	IZIN, KEŠDA
𒂢	U+120A2	EZEN x A	288		
𒂣	U+120A3	EZEN x A + LAL	289	159	SIL_{7}
𒂤	U+120A4	EZEN x A + LAL x LAL	290	160	ASILAL_{4}
𒂥	U+120A5	EZEN x AN			
𒂦	U+120A6	EZEN x BAD	275	152	UG_{5}, UN_{3}, BAD_{3}
𒂧	U+120A7	EZEN x DUN_{3} gunû	287	162	
𒂨	U+120A8	EZEN x DUN_{3} gunû gunû			
𒂩	U+120A9	EZEN x ḪA	291	161	
𒂪	U+120AA	EZEN x ḪA gunû			
𒂫	U+120AB	EZEN x IGI gunû			
𒂬	U+120AC	EZEN x KASKAL	277		
𒂭	U+120AD	EZEN x KASKAL squared			
𒂮	U+120AE	EZEN x KU_{3}	284	152	
𒂯	U+120AF	EZEN x LA	274	152	
𒂰	U+120B0	EZEN x LAL x LAL			
𒂱	U+120B1	EZEN x LI	273	153	
𒂲	U+120B2	EZEN x LU	286	157	
𒂳	U+120B3	EZEN x U_{2}	279		
𒂴	U+120B4	EZEN x UD	283		
𒂵	U+120B5	GA	491	319	
𒂶	U+120B6	GA gunû	492		
𒂷	U+120B7	GA_{2}	387	233	
𒂸	U+120B8	GA_{2} x A + DA + ḪA	428	273	
𒂹	U+120B9	GA_{2} x A + ḪA			
𒂺	U+120BA	GA_{2} x A + IGI	429	274	
𒂻	U+120BB	GA_{2} x AB_{2} tenû + TAB	423?		
𒂼	U+120BC	GA_{2} x AN	392	237	AMA
𒂽	U+120BD	GA_{2} x AŠ	389	234	
𒂾	U+120BE	GA_{2} x AŠ_{2} + GAL	414	258	
𒂿	U+120BF	GA_{2} x BAD	395	242	
𒃀	U+120C0	GA_{2} x BAR + RA			
𒃁	U+120C1	GA_{2} x BUR			
𒃂	U+120C2	GA_{2} x BUR + RA	415	259	
𒃃	U+120C3	GA_{2} x DA	416	416	
𒃄	U+120C4	GA_{2} x DI	425	268	
𒃅	U+120C5	GA_{2} x DIM x ŠE	401	206	
𒃆	U+120C6	GA_{2} x DUB	403	250	
𒃇	U+120C7	GA_{2} x EL			
𒃈	U+120C8	GA_{2} x EL + LA	433	272	
𒃉	U+120C9	GA_{2} x EN	399	247	
𒃊	U+120CA	GA_{2} x EN x GAN_{2} tenû	400	239	GA_{2} x BURU_{14}
𒃋	U+120CB	GA_{2} x GAN_{2} tenû	402	248	
𒃌	U+120CC	GA_{2} x GAR	431	278	GALGA
𒃍	U+120CD	GA_{2} x GI	396	243	
𒃎	U+120CE	GA_{2} x GI_{4}	412	256	
𒃏	U+120CF	GA_{2} x GI_{4} + A			
𒃐	U+120D0	GA_{2} x GIR_{2} + SU	391	236	
𒃑	U+120D1	GA_{2} x ḪA + LU + EŠ_{2}	430	277	
𒃒	U+120D2	GA_{2} x ḪAL			
𒃓	U+120D3	GA_{2} x ḪAL + LA	390	235	
𒃔	U+120D4	GA_{2} x ḪI + LI	421	263	
𒃕	U+120D5	GA_{2} x ḪUB_{2}	398		
𒃖	U+120D6	GA_{2} x IGI gunû	417	260	
𒃗	U+120D7	GA_{2} x IŠ + ḪU + AŠ	406	250i	
𒃘	U+120D8	GA_{2} x KAK	407	251	
𒃙	U+120D9	GA_{2} x KASKAL	405	250d	
𒃚	U+120DA	GA_{2} x KID	394	241	
𒃛	U+120DB	GA_{2} x KID + LAL	409	251	
𒃜	U+120DC	GA_{2} x KU_{3} + AN	426	269	
𒃝	U+120DD	GA_{2} x LA			
𒃞	U+120DE	GA_{2} x ME + EN	427	270	MEN
𒃟	U+120DF	GA_{2} x MI	424	265	ITIMA
𒃠	U+120E0	GA_{2} x NUN	397	244	GANUN
𒃡	U+120E1	GA_{2} x NUN / NUN	411	255	UR_{3}
𒃢	U+120E2	GA_{2} x PA	408	252; 257	GAZI, SILA_{4}
𒃣	U+120E3	GA_{2} x SAL	432	271	ARḪUŠ
𒃤	U+120E4	GA_{2} x SAR	413	250b	
𒃥	U+120E5	GA_{2} x ŠE	418	261	ESAG_{2}
𒃦	U+120E6	GA_{2} x ŠE + TUR	419	261a; 272a	
𒃧	U+120E7	GA_{2} x ŠID	410	252	
𒃨	U+120E8	GA_{2} x SUM	404	250c	
𒃩	U+120E9	GA_{2} x TAK_{4}	394		
𒃪	U+120EA	GA_{2} x U	422	264	
𒃫	U+120EB	GA_{2} x UD	420	262	
𒃬	U+120EC	GA_{2} x UD + DU			
𒃭	U+120ED	GA_{2} / GA_{2}			
𒃮	U+120EE	GABA		167	
𒃯	U+120EF	GABA crossing GABA			
𒃰	U+120F0	GAD	157	90	
𒃱	U+120F1	GAD / GAD GAR / GAR			
𒃲	U+120F2	GAL	553	343	
𒃳	U+120F3	GAL GAD / GAD GAR / GAR			
𒃴	U+120F4	GALAM	338	176k	SUKUD
𒃵	U+120F5	GAM	576	362	
𒃶	U+120F6	GAN	253	143	KAN, ḪE_{2}, SAG_{7}
𒃷	U+120F7	GAN_{2}	174	105I	
𒃸	U+120F8	GAN_{2} tenû	175	105	KAR_{2}, ŠE_{3} tenû
𒃹	U+120F9	GAN_{2} / GAN_{2}	174v		
𒃺	U+120FA	GAN_{2} crossing GAN_{2}	174v		
𒃻	U+120FB	GAR	859	597	NINDA, NIG_{2}, ĜAR
𒃼	U+120FC	GAR_{3}	543	333	
𒃽	U+120FD	GAŠAN	562; 563	350	U gunû
𒃾	U+120FE	GEŠTIN	212	210	
𒃿	U+120FF	GEŠTIN x KUR	213		
𒄀	U+12100	GI	141	85	GE, GIN_{7}
𒄁	U+12101	GI x E			
𒄂	U+12102	GI x U			
𒄃	U+12103	GI crossing GI	105	67	GI_{16}, GILIM
𒄄	U+12104	GI_{4}	507	326	GE_{4}
𒄅	U+12105	GI_{4} / GI_{4}	508	326a	GIGI
𒄆	U+12106	GI_{4} crossing GI_{4}	508	326a	GIGI
𒄇	U+12107	GIDIM	830	576	
𒄈	U+12108	GIR_{2}	006	10	ĜIRI_{2}
𒄉	U+12109	GIR_{2} gunû	007	10	
𒄊	U+1210A	GIR_{3}	701	444	PIRIĜ, ĜIRI_{3}, GIRI_{3}
𒄋	U+1210B	GIR_{3} x A + IGI	703	421; 579,396	
𒄌	U+1210C	GIR_{3} x GAN_{2} tenû	675	423	GIRI_{16}
𒄍	U+1210D	GIR_{3} x IGI			
𒄎	U+1210E	GIR_{3} x LU + IGI	702	537,129	
𒄏	U+1210F	GIR_{3} x PA			
𒄐	U+12110	GISAL	376	226	
𒄑	U+12111	GIŠ	469	296	ĜEŠ, SAG_{3}
𒄒	U+12112	GIŠ crossing GIŠ	469v		
𒄓	U+12113	GIŠ x BAD	471		
𒄔	U+12114	GIŠ x TAK_{4}			
𒄕	U+12115	GIŠ tenû	470	296	GUR_{17}
𒄖	U+12116	GU	891	559	
𒄗	U+12117	GU crossing GU	892	569	SÙḪ
𒄘	U+12118	GU_{2}	176	106	
𒄙	U+12119	GU_{2} x KAK	178		DUR
𒄚	U+1211A	GU_{2} x KAK x IGI gunû			
𒄛	U+1211B	GU_{2} x NUN			
𒄜	U+1211C	GU_{2} x SAL + TUG_{2}			
𒄝	U+1211D	GU_{2} gunû	509	327	USAN_{2}
𒄞	U+1211E	GUD	472	297	GU_{4} "cow"
𒄟	U+1211F	GUD x A + KUR			
𒄠	U+12120	GUD x KUR	309	170	ADAR_{2}, AM, AMA_{2}, ILDAG_{3}
𒄡	U+12121	GUD / GUD LUGAL	572	357	BIŠEBA_{3}
𒄢	U+12122	GUL	682	429	SUN_{2}
𒄣	U+12123	GUM	339	191	KUM
𒄤	U+12124	GUM x ŠE	340	192	GAZ, GAS
𒄥	U+12125	GUR	180	111	
𒄦	U+12126	GUR_{7}	819	542	
𒄧	U+12127	GURUN	503	310	
𒄨	U+12128	GURUŠ		322	
𒄩	U+12129	ḪA	856	589	KU_{6}
𒄪	U+1212A	ḪA tenû	857	590	ZUBUD
𒄫	U+1212B	ḪA gunû	558	346	GIR, PE
𒄬	U+1212C	ḪAL	003	002	= AŠ.AŠ
𒄭	U+1212D	ḪI	631	396	DU_{10}, DUG_{3}, DUB_{3}
𒄮	U+1212E	ḪI x AŠ	634	405	SUR_{3}
𒄯^{CVC}	U+1212F	ḪI x AŠ_{2}	644	401	ḪAR, ḪUR, HAR
𒄰	U+12130	ḪI x BAD	640; 595	406	DU_{15}, KAM
𒄱	U+12131	ḪI x DIŠ	659	409e	ŠÁR x DIŠ
𒄲	U+12132	ḪI x GAD	650	407	ŠÁR x GAD
𒄳	U+12133	ḪI x KIN	660	410	
𒄴	U+12134	ḪI x NUN	636	398	AḪ, IḪ, UḪ, AH
𒄵	U+12135	ḪI x ŠE	643	400	BIR
𒄶	U+12136	ḪI x U	653; 688	409	ŠÁR x U; DÚBUR
𒄷	U+12137	ḪU	132	78	
𒄸	U+12138	ḪUB_{2}	149	88	TU_{11}, TUN_{2}
𒄹	U+12139	ḪUB_{2} x AN			
𒄺	U+1213A	ḪUB_{2} x ḪAL			
𒄻	U+1213B	ḪUB_{2} x KASKAL			
𒄼	U+1213C	ḪUB_{2} x LIŠ			
𒄽	U+1213D	ḪUB_{2} x UD	150		TU_{10}
𒄾	U+1213E	ḪUL_{2}	877	550	HUL_{2}
𒄿	U+1213F	I	252	142	
𒅀	U+12140	I A			
𒅁	U+12141	IB	807	535	
𒅂	U+12142	IDIM			
𒅃	U+12143	IDIM / IDIM BUR			
𒅄	U+12144	IDIM / IDIM squared			
𒅅	U+12145	IG	136	80	IK, ĜAL_{2}, GAL_{2}
𒅆	U+12146	IGI	724	449	ŠI, LIM, GI_{8}
𒅇	U+12147	IGI DIB	731	455	U_{3}
𒅈	U+12148	IGI RI	726	451	AR
𒅉	U+12149	IGI / IGI ŠIR / ŠIR UD / UD			
𒅊	U+1214A	IGI gunû	564	351	SIG_{7}
𒅋	U+1214B	IL	348	205	
𒅌	U+1214C	IL x GAN_{2} tenû	349		
𒅍	U+1214D	IL_{2}	493	320	
𒅎	U+1214E	IM	641	399	EM, TUM_{9}, tumu, TU_{15}
𒅏	U+1214F	IM x TAK_{4}	642	399,51	
𒅐	U+12150	IM crossing IM	641v	399*	DALHAMUN_{6}, MERMER_{3}
𒅑	U+12151	IM opposing IM	641v		
𒅒	U+12152	IM squared	641v	399**	
𒅓	U+12153	IMIN	863	598c	"7", "SEVEN"
𒅔	U+12154	IN	261	148	
𒅕	U+12155	IR	437	232	GAG gunû, ER
𒅖	U+12156	IŠ	357	212	
𒅗	U+12157	KA	024	15	INIM "word", GU_{3}, ZU_{2}, DUG_{4}, DU_{11}, KIR_{4}, GIRI_{17}
𒅘	U+12158	KA x A	064	35	NAĜ
𒅙	U+12159	KA x AD			
𒅚	U+1215A	KA x AD + KU_{3}	034	20	
𒅛	U+1215B	KA x AŠ_{2}	046		
𒅜	U+1215C	KA x BAD			UŠ_{11}
𒅝	U+1215D	KA x BALAG	047		
𒅞	U+1215E	KA x BAR	030		
𒅟	U+1215F	KA x BI			
𒅠	U+12160	KA x ERIN_{2}	053	29*	
𒅡	U+12161	KA x EŠ_{2}			
𒅢	U+12162	KA x GA	044		
𒅣	U+12163	KA x GAL			
𒅤	U+12164	KA x GAN_{2} tenû	033	19	PU_{3}
𒅥	U+12165	KA x GAR	065		GU_{7}
𒅦	U+12166	KA x GAR + ŠA_{3} + A	066		
𒅧	U+12167	KA x GI			
𒅨	U+12168	KA x GIR_{2}	025		
𒅩	U+12169	KA x GIŠ + SAR			
𒅪	U+1216A	KA x GIŠ crossing GIŠ			
𒅫	U+1216B	KA x GU	069	34	
𒅬	U+1216C	KA x GUR_{7}	063		
𒅭	U+1216D	KA x IGI	059		
𒅮	U+1216E	KA x IM	054	30	BUN_{2}
𒅯	U+1216F	KA x KAK	038		
𒅰	U+12170	KA x KI	060		
𒅱	U+12171	KA x KID			
𒅲	U+12172	KA x LI	026	16	
𒅳	U+12173	KA x LU			
𒅴	U+12174	KA x ME	061	32	EME
𒅵	U+12175	KA x ME + DU			
𒅶	U+12176	KA x ME + GI			
𒅷	U+12177	KA x ME + TE			
𒅸	U+12178	KA x MI	057		
𒅹	U+12179	KA x MI + NUNUZ			
𒅺	U+1217A	KA x NE	035		
𒅻	U+1217B	KA x NUN	031	18	NUNDUM
𒅼	U+1217C	KA x PI	052		
𒅽	U+1217D	KA x RU	028		
𒅾	U+1217E	KA x SA	032	18*	SU_{6}
𒅿	U+1217F	KA x SAR	045		MU_{11}
𒆀	U+12180	KA x ŠA	048		
𒆁	U+12181	KA x ŠE	050		
𒆂	U+12182	KA x ŠID	042		
𒆃	U+12183	KA x ŠU	049; 033	19; 26	ŠÚDU, PÚ
𒆄	U+12184	KA x SIG	068		
𒆅	U+12185	KA x SUḪUR			
𒆆	U+12186	KA x TAR			
𒆇	U+12187	KA x U	056		
𒆈	U+12188	KA x U_{2}	043		
𒆉	U+12189	KA x UD	051		
𒆊	U+1218A	KA x UMUM x PA			
𒆋	U+1218B	KA x UŠ	039		
𒆌	U+1218C	KA x ZI			
𒆍	U+1218D	KA_{2}	222	133	
𒆎	U+1218E	KA_{2} crossing KA_{2}			
𒆏	U+1218F	KAB	148	88	GAB_{2}
𒆐	U+12190	KAD_{2}	108	63a	
𒆑	U+12191	KAD_{3}	109	63c	
𒆒	U+12192	KAD_{4}	568	354b	
𒆓	U+12193	KAD_{5}	569	354b	
𒆔	U+12194	KAD_{5} / KAD_{5}			
𒆕	U+12195	KAK	379	230	GAG, DU_{3}, RU_{2}
𒆖	U+12196	KAK x IGI gunû			
𒆗	U+12197	KAL	496	322	ALAD_{2} ,KALAG
𒆘	U+12198	KAL x BAD	497	323	ALAD
𒆙	U+12199	KAL crossing KAL			
𒆚	U+1219A	KAM_{2}	595		
𒆛	U+1219B	KAM_{4}	097		
𒆜	U+1219C	KASKAL	302	166	
𒆝	U+1219D	KASKAL LAGAB x U / LAGAB x U	307v		ŠUBTU_{6}
𒆞	U+1219E	KASKAL / KASKAL LAGAB x U / LAGAB x U	307v		ŠUBTU_{7}
𒆟	U+1219F	KEŠ_{2}		152	
𒆠	U+121A0	KI	737	461	GAN from GANBA(market)
𒆡	U+121A1	KI x BAD	738		
𒆢	U+121A2	KI x U	740	462	
𒆣	U+121A3	KI x UD	739	463	
𒆤	U+121A4	KID	484	313	LÍL_{2}, GÉ, KE_{4}
𒆥	U+121A5	KIN	815	538	SAGA_{11}
𒆦	U+121A6	KISAL	435	249	
𒆧	U+121A7	KIŠ	678	425	
𒆨	U+121A8	KISIM_{5}	687	404*,1	
𒆩	U+121A9	KISIM_{5} / KISIM_{5}	687v		
𒆪	U+121AA	KU	808	536	DÚR, TUKUL, TUŠ
𒆫	U+121AB	KU / ḪI x AŠ_{2} KU / ḪI x ÁŠ			
𒆬	U+121AC	KU_{3}	745	468	KUG
𒆭	U+121AD	KU_{4}	087	58	KUR_{9} (See also: 𒋽)
𒆮	U+121AE	KU_{4} variant form			
𒆯	U+121AF	KU_{7}	171	110	
𒆰	U+121B0	KUL	117	72	NUMUN
𒆱	U+121B1	KUL gunû			
𒆲	U+121B2	KUN	131	77	
𒆳	U+121B3	KUR	578	366	GIN_{3}, KUR^{The underworld}
𒆴	U+121B4	KUR opposing KUR			LAHMU
𒆵	U+121B5	KUŠU_{2}	896	562	
𒆶	U+121B6	KWU_{318}			
𒆷	U+121B7	LA	089	55	
𒆸	U+121B8	LAGAB	755	483	NIGIN_{2}, GUR_{4}
𒆹	U+121B9	LAGAB x A	795	522	AMBAR, BUGIN, BUNIN, SUG
𒆺	U+121BA	LAGAB x A + DA + ḪA	797	523*; 524	
𒆻	U+121BB	LAGAB x A + GAR	799	526	
𒆼	U+121BC	LAGAB x A + LAL	798		
𒆽	U+121BD	LAGAB x AL	773	498	
𒆾	U+121BE	LAGAB x AN	758		
𒆿	U+121BF	LAGAB x AŠ ZIDA tenû	778	486,1; 504	
𒇀	U+121C0	LAGAB x BAD	760	486	GIGIR
𒇁	U+121C1	LAGAB x BI	769	496	
𒇂	U+121C2	LAGAB x DAR	765	489	
𒇃	U+121C3	LAGAB x EN	764		
𒇄	U+121C4	LAGAB x GA	775		
𒇅	U+121C5	LAGAB x GAR	801	528	
𒇆	U+121C6	LAGAB x GUD	772	493	
𒇇	U+121C7	LAGAB x GUD + GUD	766	494	
𒇈	U+121C8	LAGAB x ḪA	800	527	
𒇉	U+121C9	LAGAB x ḪAL	756	484	ENGUR
𒇊	U+121CA	LAGAB x ḪI x NUN	784	509	
𒇋	U+121CB	LAGAB x IGI gunû			
𒇌	U+121CC	LAGAB x IM	785	510	
𒇍	U+121CD	LAGAB x IM + ḪA			
𒇎	U+121CE	LAGAB x IM + LU			
𒇏	U+121CF	LAGAB x KI	789	514	
𒇐	U+121D0	LAGAB x KIN	794	519	
𒇑	U+121D1	LAGAB x KU_{3}	790	513; 506	GARIM
𒇒	U+121D2	LAGAB x KUL	761		
𒇓	U+121D3	LAGAB x KUL + ḪI + A	762		
𒇔	U+121D4	LAGAB x LAGAB	804	529	NIĜIN
𒇕	U+121D5	LAGAB x LIŠ	782	486,1; 503	
𒇖	U+121D6	LAGAB x LU	793	518	
𒇗	U+121D7	LAGAB x LUL	777	502	
𒇘	U+121D8	LAGAB x ME	791	516	
𒇙	U+121D9	LAGAB x ME + EN	792	517	
𒇚	U+121DA	LAGAB x MUŠ	780	507	
𒇛	U+121DB	LAGAB x NE	768	495	UDUB
𒇜	U+121DC	LAGAB x ŠE + SUM	779	491,6; 492	
𒇝	U+121DD	LAGAB x ŠITA + GIŠ + ERIN_{2}			
𒇞	U+121DE	LAGAB x ŠITA + GIŠ tenû			
𒇟	U+121DF	LAGAB x ŠU_{2}	802	520	
𒇠	U+121E0	LAGAB x ŠU_{2} + ŠU_{2}	803	521	
𒇡	U+121E1	LAGAB x SUM	767	491	ZAR
𒇢	U+121E2	LAGAB x TAG			
𒇣	U+121E3	LAGAB x TAK_{4}	759	485	
𒇤	U+121E4	LAGAB x TE + A + SU + NA			
𒇥	U+121E5	LAGAB x U	786	511	GÍGIR "wain"; PÚ, TÚL "source, fount"
𒇦	U+121E6	LAGAB x U + A	787	512	
𒇧	U+121E7	LAGAB x U + U + U	788	515	BUL
𒇨	U+121E8	LAGAB x U_{2} + AŠ	774	499	
𒇩	U+121E9	LAGAB x UD	783	505	
𒇪	U+121EA	LAGAB x UŠ	770		
𒇫	U+121EB	LAGAB squared	805	530	
𒇬	U+121EC	LAGAR	719	458	HZL nr. 186
𒇭	U+121ED	LAGAR x ŠE	722	460	SU_{7}
𒇮	U+121EE	LAGAR x ŠE + SUM	723		
𒇯	U+121EF	LAGAR gunû	721	459	DU_{6}
𒇰	U+121F0	LAGAR gunû / LAGAR gunû ŠE	721v		
𒇱	U+121F1	LAḪŠU			
𒇲	U+121F2	LAL	750	481	LA_{2}
𒇳	U+121F3	LAL x LAL	751	482	LAL_{2}
𒇴	U+121F4	LAM	693	435	BA from GANBA(market)
𒇵	U+121F5	LAM x KUR	694	436	EŠ_{22}
𒇶	U+121F6	LAM x KUR + RU	694v	436,4	
𒇷	U+121F7	LI	085	59	
𒇸	U+121F8	LIL	544	336	
𒇹	U+121F9	LIMMU_{2}	215	124	
𒇺	U+121FA	LIŠ	591	377	DÍLIM
𒇻	U+121FB	LU	812	537	UDU
𒇼	U+121FC	LU x BAD	814	537,65c; 537*	ÀD
𒇽	U+121FD	LU_{2}	514	330	Person
𒇾	U+121FE	LU_{2} x AL	523		
𒇿	U+121FF	LU_{2} x BAD	517		
𒈀	U+12200	LU_{2} x EŠ_{2}			
𒈁	U+12201	LU_{2} x EŠ_{2} tenû			
𒈂	U+12202	LU_{2} x GAN_{2} tenû	521		
𒈃	U+12203	LU_{2} x ḪI x BAD			
𒈄	U+12204	LU_{2} x IM	526		
𒈅	U+12205	LU_{2} x KAD_{2}	519		
𒈆	U+12206	LU_{2} x KAD_{3}			
𒈇	U+12207	LU_{2} x KAD_{3} + AŠ			
𒈈	U+12208	LU_{2} x KI	527		
𒈉	U+12209	LU_{2} x LA + AŠ			
𒈊	U+1220A	LU_{2} x LAGAB	528		
𒈋	U+1220B	LU_{2} x ME + EN			
𒈌	U+1220C	LU_{2} x NE	522		DU_{14}
𒈍	U+1220D	LU_{2} x NU			
𒈎	U+1220E	LU_{2} x SI + AŠ			
𒈏	U+1220F	LU_{2} x SIK_{2} + BU	533		
𒈐	U+12210	LU_{2} x TUG_{2}	530		AZLAG_{7}
𒈑	U+12211	LU_{2} tenû	515		
𒈒	U+12212	LU_{2} crossing LU_{2}			
𒈓	U+12213	LU_{2} opposing LU_{2}			
𒈔	U+12214	LU_{2} squared			
𒈕	U+12215	LU_{2} šešig	516; 534	330	DIM_{3}
𒈖	U+12216	LU_{3}	555	345	GÚG, ŠÈ gunû
𒈗	U+12217	LUGAL	266	151	
𒈘	U+12218	LUGAL / LUGAL	266v		DADRUM?
𒈙	U+12219	LUGAL opposing LUGAL	266v		unattested
𒈚	U+1221A	LUGAL šešig			DIM_{3}
𒈛	U+1221B	LUḪ	494	321	
𒈜	U+1221C	LUL	570	355	NAR
𒈝	U+1221D	LUM	900	565	ḪUM
𒈞	U+1221E	LUM / LUM	902	565a; 566a	
𒈟	U+1221F	LUM / LUM GAR / GAR	904	566b	LÙGUD
𒈠	U+12220	MA	552	342	
𒈡	U+12221	MA x TAK_{4}			
𒈢	U+12222	MA gunû	270	146	ḪASḪUR
𒈣	U+12223	MA_{2}	201	122	
𒈤	U+12224	MAḪ	091	57	MAH
𒈥	U+12225	MAR	483	307	
𒈦	U+12226	MAŠ	120	74	
𒈧	U+12227	MAŠ_{2}	130	76	
𒈨	U+12228	ME	753	532	
𒈩	U+12229	MES	486	533	RID, KIŠIB
𒈪	U+1222A	MI	681	427	ĜI_{6}, GE_{6}
𒈫	U+1222B	MIN	825	570	
𒈬	U+1222C	MU	098	61	ĜU_{10}
𒈭	U+1222D	MU / MU	301	169	TAḪ, DAḪ
𒈮	U+1222E	MUG	012	003	oakum
𒈯	U+1222F	MUG gunû	0013	4	ZADIM
𒈰	U+12230	MUNSUB	820	543	MUNŠUB
𒈱	U+12231	MURGU_{2}		567	
𒈲	U+12232	MUŠ	585	374	
𒈳	U+12233	MUŠ x A			
𒈴	U+12234	MUŠ x KUR			
𒈵	U+12235	MUŠ x ZA			
𒈶	U+12236	MUŠ / MUŠ	586		RI_{8}
𒈷	U+12237	MUŠ / MUŠ x A + NA			
𒈸	U+12238	MUŠ crossing MUŠ			
𒈹	U+12239	MUŠ_{3}	153	103	INANNA, INNIN
𒈺	U+1223A	MUŠ_{3} x A	154		
𒈻	U+1223B	MUŠ_{3} x A + DI	155		
𒈼	U+1223C	MUŠ_{3} x DI			
𒈽	U+1223D	MUŠ_{3} gunû			SUH
𒈾	U+1223E	NA	110	70	
𒈿	U+1223F	NA_{2}	689	431	NU_{2}
𒉀	U+12240	NAGA	293		NISABA
𒉁^{Haya}	U+12241	NAGA inverted			ḪAYA
𒉂	U+12242	NAGA x ŠU tenû	294		
𒉃	U+12243	NAGA opposing NAGA			
𒉄	U+12244	NAGAR	893	560	ALLA
𒉅	U+12245	NAM NUTILLU			
𒉆	U+12246	NAM	134	79	
𒉇	U+12247	NAM_{2}			
𒉈	U+12248	NE	313	172	BI_{2}, DE_{3}, DU_{17}, IZI, LAM_{2}, LIM_{4}
𒉉	U+12249	NE x A	315		
𒉊	U+1224A	NE x UD	314		
𒉋	U+1224B	NE šešig	312	173	BÍL
𒉌	U+1224C	NI	380	231	I_{3}
𒉍	U+1224D	NI x E			
𒉎	U+1224E	NI_{2}	641	399	
𒉏	U+1224F	NIM	690	433	NUM
𒉐	U+12250	NIM x GAN_{2} tenû	691	434	
𒉑	U+12251	NIM x GAR + GAN_{2} tenû	692	434a	
𒉒	U+12252	NINDA_{2}	316	176	
𒉓	U+12253	NINDA_{2} x AN	320		
𒉔	U+12254	NINDA_{2} x AŠ	317	176,12; 177,2	
𒉕	U+12255	NINDA_{2} x AŠ + AŠ	316	177,3	
𒉖	U+12256	NINDA_{2} x GUD	327	187,6	
𒉗	U+12257	NINDA_{2} x ME + GAN_{2} tenû			
𒉘	U+12258	NINDA_{2} x NE	326	183	ÁG "darling", RE, AĜ_{2}
𒉙	U+12259	NINDA_{2} x NUN	324	181	AZU
𒉚	U+1225A	NINDA_{2} x ŠE	333v3		
𒉛	U+1225B	NINDA_{2} x ŠE + A AN	333		ŠAM_{2}
𒉜	U+1225C	NINDA_{2} x ŠE + AŠ	331		
𒉝	U+1225D	NINDA_{2} x ŠE + AŠ + AŠ	332		
𒉞	U+1225E	NINDA_{2} x U_{2} + AŠ	330		
𒉟	U+1225F	NINDA_{2} x UŠ			
𒉠	U+12260	NISAG	545	337	MURU_{2}, MURUB_{4}, ITI gunû
𒉡	U+12261	NU	112	75	
𒉢	U+12262	NU_{11}	115	71	ŠIR
𒉣	U+12263	NUN	143	87	eridu
𒉤	U+12264	NUN LAGAR x GAR			
𒉥	U+12265	NUN LAGAR x MAŠ			
𒉦	U+12266	NUN LAGAR x SAL			
𒉧	U+12267	NUN LAGAR x SAL / NUN LAGAR x SAL			
𒉨	U+12268	NUN LAGAR x UŠ			
𒉩	U+12269	NUN tenû	144	87	
𒉪	U+1226A	NUN / NUN	502	325	NIR
𒉫	U+1226B	NUN crossing NUN	107	63d	
𒉬	U+1226C	NUN crossing NUN LAGAR / LAGAR			
𒉭	U+1226D	NUNUZ	614	394	
𒉮	U+1226E	NUNUZ AB_{2} x AŠGAB	619	394c,e	USAN_{3}
𒉯	U+1226F	NUNUZ AB_{2} x BI	621	394d	MUD_{3}
𒉰	U+12270	NUNUZ AB_{2} x DUG	625		
𒉱	U+12271	NUNUZ AB_{2} x GUD	623		
𒉲	U+12272	NUNUZ AB_{2} x IGI gunû	627		
𒉳	U+12273	NUNUZ AB_{2} x KAD_{3}	618		
𒉴	U+12274	NUNUZ AB_{2} x LA	616	394b	LAḪTAN
𒉵	U+12275	NUNUZ AB_{2} x NE	620		
𒉶	U+12276	NUNUZ AB_{2} x SILA_{3}	617	394b'	LAḪTAN_{2}
𒉷	U+12277	NUNUZ AB_{2} x U_{2}	(624)		
𒉸	U+12278	NUNUZ KISIM_{5} x BI	621	394d	MUD_{3}
𒉹	U+12279	NUNUZ KISIM_{5} x BI U	622		MUD_{3}.U
𒉺	U+1227A	PA	464	295	GIDRU "staff, sceptre", UGULA "overseer", GARZA "office"
𒉻	U+1227B	PAD	746	469	ŠUK
𒉼	U+1227C	PAN	685	439	BAN, BANA, PANA; Akkadian qaštu
𒉽	U+1227D	PAP	092	60	PAB, KUR_{2}
𒉾	U+1227E	PEŠ_{2}	741; 882	346	
𒉿	U+1227F	PI	598	383	TAL_{2}
𒊀	U+12280	PI x A	598v		HZL nr. 326
𒊁	U+12281	PI x AB	598v		HZL nr. 318
𒊂	U+12282	PI x BI	598v		HZL nr. 320
𒊃	U+12283	PI x BU	598v		HZL nr. 324
𒊄	U+12284	PI x E	598v		HZL nr. 322
𒊅	U+12285	PI x I	598v		HZL nr. 319
𒊆	U+12286	PI x IB	598v		HZL nr. 325
𒊇	U+12287	PI x U	598v		HZL nr. 323
𒊈	U+12288	PI x U_{2}	598v		HZL nr. 321
𒊉	U+12289	PI crossing PI	598v	383,3	
𒊊	U+1228A	PIRIG		444	
𒊋	U+1228B	PIRIG x KAL	295		
𒊌	U+1228C	PIRIG x UD	296	130	UG, UKU_{4}
𒊍	U+1228D	PIRIG x ZA	297		AZ
𒊎	U+1228E	PIRIG opposing PIRIG			
𒊏	U+1228F	RA	511	328	
𒊐	U+12290	RAB	262	149	
𒊑	U+12291	RI	142	86	DAL, RE, TAL, ŠA_{7}
𒊒	U+12292	RU	111	48	
𒊓	U+12293	SA	172	104	
𒊔	U+12294	SAG NUTILLU			
𒊕	U+12295	SAG	184	115	SAĜ
𒊖	U+12296	SAG x A	197		
𒊗	U+12297	SAG x DU	187		
𒊘	U+12298	SAG x DUB			
𒊙	U+12299	SAG x ḪA	198		
𒊚	U+1229A	SAG x KAK	188		
𒊛	U+1229B	SAG x KUR			
𒊜	U+1229C	SAG x LUM	200		
𒊝	U+1229D	SAG x MI	195		
𒊞	U+1229E	SAG x NUN	185		
𒊟	U+1229F	SAG x SAL	199		
𒊠	U+122A0	SAG x ŠID	191		
𒊡	U+122A1	SAG x TAB			
𒊢	U+122A2	SAG x U_{2}	192		
𒊣	U+122A3	SAG x UB	193		
𒊤	U+122A4	SAG x UM	186		
𒊥	U+122A5	SAG x UR	196		
𒊦	U+122A6	SAG x UŠ	190		
𒊧	U+122A7	SAG / SAG			
𒊨	U+122A8	SAG gunû	512	329	DUL_{3}
𒊩	U+122A9	SAL	883	554	MI_{2}, MUNUS
𒊪	U+122AA	SAL LAGAB x AŠ_{2}			
𒊫	U+122AB	SANGA_{2}		314	
𒊬	U+122AC	SAR	541	152	MU_{2}, SAR
𒊭	U+122AD	ŠA	566	353	
𒊮	U+122AE	ŠA_{3}	599	384	ŠAG_{4}
𒊯	U+122AF	ŠA_{3} x A	608	390	PEŠ_{4}
𒊰	U+122B0	ŠA_{3} x BAD	600		
𒊱	U+122B1	ŠA_{3} x GIŠ	603		
𒊲	U+122B2	ŠA_{3} x NE	602	385	
𒊳	U+122B3	ŠA_{3} x ŠU_{2}	609	389	
𒊴	U+122B4	ŠA_{3} x TUR	601		
𒊵	U+122B5	ŠA_{3} x U	605		
𒊶	U+122B6	ŠA_{3} x U + A	606	388	BIR_{6}
𒊷	U+122B7	ŠA_{6}			SAG_{9}
𒊸	U+122B8	ŠAB_{6}		295k	
𒊹	U+122B9	ŠAR_{2}	632; 633	396	TI_{2}
𒊺	U+122BA	ŠE	579	367	
𒊻	U+122BB	ŠE ḪU			
𒊼	U+122BC	ŠE / ŠE GAD / GAD GAR / GAR			
𒊽	U+122BD	ŠE / ŠE TAB / TAB GAR / GAR			
𒊾	U+122BE	ŠEG_{9}	878	551	
𒊿	U+122BF	ŠEN	017	008	= SU x A, ALAL, PISAN_{3}, DUR_{10}
𒋀	U+122C0	ŠEŠ	535	331	URI_{3}, URU_{3}
𒋁	U+122C1	ŠEŠ_{2}	821	544	
𒋂	U+122C2	ŠEŠLAM	100	65	
𒋃	U+122C3	ŠID	485	314	LAG, UTTU_{2}
𒋄	U+122C4	ŠID x A	489	317	UMBISAG_{2}
𒋅	U+122C5	ŠID x IM	487	317a	
𒋆	U+122C6	ŠIM	362	215	
𒋇	U+122C7	ŠIM x A	372		
𒋈	U+122C8	ŠIM x BAL	363	216,3; 217	
𒋉	U+122C9	ŠIM x BULUG	367	218,2	
𒋊	U+122CA	ŠIM x DIN	366	221	
𒋋	U+122CB	ŠIM x GAR	373	225	
𒋌	U+122CC	ŠIM x IGI	371		
𒋍	U+122CD	ŠIM x IGI gunû	368	219*	
𒋎	U+122CE	ŠIM x KUŠU_{2}	375	223	
𒋏	U+122CF	ŠIM x LUL	369		
𒋐	U+122D0	ŠIM x MUG	365	216	
𒋑	U+122D1	ŠIM x SAL	374	222	
𒋒	U+122D2	ŠINIG		93	
𒋓	U+122D3	ŠIR	115	71	
𒋔	U+122D4	ŠIR tenû	116		
𒋕	U+122D5	ŠIR / ŠIR BUR / BUR			
𒋖	U+122D6	ŠITA	388	233,22	"GA_{2}"
𒋗	U+122D7	ŠU	567	354	
𒋘	U+122D8	ŠU / inverted ŠU			
𒋙	U+122D9	ŠU_{2}	869	545	
𒋚	U+122DA	ŠUBUR	0022	53	
𒋛	U+122DB	SI	181	112	MA
𒋜	U+122DC	SI gunû	182	113	SU_{4}
𒋝	U+122DD	SIG	881	592	
𒋞	U+122DE	SIG_{4}	905; 906	567	MURGU; HZL nr. 311
𒋟	U+122DF	SIG_{4} / SIG_{4} ŠU_{2}	907	568	
𒋠	U+122E0	SIK_{2}	816	539	SIG_{2}, SIKI
𒋡	U+122E1	SILA_{3}	099	62	
𒋢	U+122E2	SU	016	007	also KUŠ "skin, hide"
𒋣	U+122E3	SU / SU			
𒋤	U+122E4	SUD	584	373	BU gunû, SU_{3}
𒋥	U+122E5	SUD_{2}	139		
𒋦	U+122E6	SUḪUR	646	403	
𒋧	U+122E7	SUM	292	164	ŠUM_{2}
𒋨	U+122E8	SUMAŠ	323	182	
𒋩	U+122E9	SUR	151	101	
𒋪	U+122EA	SUR_{9}	205	122d	
𒋫	U+122EB	TA	248	139	
𒋬	U+122EC	TA*	248v		
𒋭	U+122ED	TA x ḪI	250		LAL_{3}
𒋮	U+122EE	TA x MI	251		
𒋯	U+122EF	TA gunû			
𒋰	U+122F0	TAB	209	124	
𒋱	U+122F1	TAB / TAB NI / NI DIŠ / DIŠ			
𒋲	U+122F2	TAB squared			
𒋳	U+122F3	TAG	221	126	
𒋴	U+122F4	TAG x BI			
𒋵	U+122F5	TAG x GUD			
𒋶	U+122F6	TAG x ŠE			
𒋷	U+122F7	TAG x ŠU			
𒋸	U+122F8	TAG x TUG_{2}			
𒋹	U+122F9	TAG x UD			
𒋺	U+122FA	TAK_{4}	106	63	KID_{2}, TAKA_{4}
𒋻	U+122FB	TAR	009	12	
𒋼	U+122FC	TE	589	376	GAL_{5}
𒋽	U+122FD	TE gunû	088	58	URU_{5}, GUR_{8}, KUR_{9} (See also: 𒆭)
𒋾	U+122FE	TI	118	73	DÌ, TE_{9}, TI, TIL_{3}, TÌ, ṬE_{6}
𒋿	U+122FF	TI tenû			
𒌀	U+12300	TIL	114	69	= BAD U+12041
𒌁	U+12301	TIR	587	375	
𒌂	U+12302	TIR x TAK_{4}			
𒌃	U+12303	TIR / TIR	587v		NINNI_{5}
𒌄	U+12304	TIR / TIR GAD / GAD GAR / GAR	588	375,46a-b	
𒌅	U+12305	TU	086	58	DU_{2}, TUD, TUR_{5}
𒌆	U+12306	TUG_{2}	809	536	NAM_{2}
𒌇	U+12307	TUK	827	574	DU_{12}, TUG
𒌈	U+12308	TUM	354	207	DU_{4}
𒌉	U+12309	TUR	255	144	DU_{13}, DUMU
𒌊	U+1230A	TUR / TUR ZA / ZA			
𒌋	U+1230B	U	661	411	BUR_{3}, BURU_{3}, UMUN, "TEN", "10"
𒌌	U+1230C	U GUD			UL, DU_{7}
𒌍	U+1230D	U U U	711	472	EŠ, "THIRTY", "30"; see "Winkelhaken".
𒌎	U+1230E	U / U PA / PA GAR / GAR			
𒌏	U+1230F	U / U SUR / SUR			
𒌐	U+12310	U / U U reversed / U reversed	713	474	MAŠGI, BARGI
𒌑	U+12311	U_{2}	490	318	
𒌒	U+12312	UB	504	306	AR_{2}
𒌓	U+12313	UD	596	381	BABBAR, UD, UT, UTA, UTU
𒌔	U+12314	UD KUŠU_{2}	611	392	UḪ_{2}
𒌕	U+12315	UD x BAD			
𒌖	U+12316	UD x MI	597	382	ITIMA_{2}
𒌗	U+12317	UD x U + U + U			DU_{16}
𒌘	U+12318	UD x U + U + U gunû			
𒌙	U+12319	UD gunû	542	337*	uncertain
𒌚	U+1231A	UD šešig	0020	52	ITI, UD x EŠ
𒌛	U+1231B	UD šešig x BAD			
𒌜	U+1231C	UDUG	833	577; 578	
𒌝	U+1231D	UM	238	134	
𒌞	U+1231E	UM x LAGAB			
𒌟	U+1231F	UM x ME + DA	241		
𒌠	U+12320	UM x ŠA_{3}			
𒌡	U+12321	UM x U	239		
𒌢	U+12322	UMBIN		92b	
𒌣	U+12323	UMUM			DU_{19}
𒌤	U+12324	UMUM x KASKAL			DE_{2}
𒌥	U+12325	UMUM x PA			
𒌦	U+12326	UN	501	312	KALAM, KANAM, UG_{3}, UĜ_{3}, UKU_{3} "man"
𒌧	U+12327	UN gunû			
𒌨	U+12328	UR	828	575	HUL
𒌩	U+12329	UR crossing UR	828v	575a	
𒌪	U+1232A	UR šešig	829		reconstruction
𒌫	U+1232B	UR_{2}	341	203	
𒌬	U+1232C	UR_{2} x A + ḪA	346		
𒌭	U+1232D	UR_{2} x A + NA			
𒌮	U+1232E	UR_{2} x AL	343		
𒌯	U+1232F	UR_{2} x ḪA	347	185,5	
𒌰	U+12330	UR_{2} x NUN	342	204	
𒌱	U+12331	UR_{2} x U_{2}	344		
𒌲	U+12332	UR_{2} x U_{2} + AŠ	345	185	
𒌳	U+12333	UR_{2} x U_{2} + BI			
𒌴	U+12334	UR_{4}	835	594	
𒌵	U+12335	URI	574	359	BUR/BUR
𒌶	U+12336	URI_{3}			
𒌷	U+12337	URU	071	38	RI_{2}, IRI
𒌸	U+12338	URU x A	081		
𒌹	U+12339	URU x AŠGAB			
𒌺	U+1233A	URU x BAR	073	40	UKKIN
𒌻	U+1233B	URU x DUN			
𒌼	U+1233C	URU x GA	076		
𒌽	U+1233D	URU x GAL			
𒌾	U+1233E	URU x GAN_{2} tenû	074		
𒌿	U+1233F	URU x GAR	083		
𒍀	U+12340	URU x GU	084		
𒍁	U+12341	URU x ḪA	082		
𒍂	U+12342	URU x IGI	079		
𒍃	U+12343	URU x IM			
𒍄	U+12344	URU x IŠ			
𒍅	U+12345	URU x KI			
𒍆	U+12346	URU x LUM			
𒍇	U+12347	URU x MIN	080		ULU_{3}, U_{18}, LU_{7}
𒍈	U+12348	URU x PA			
𒍉	U+12349	URU x ŠE			
𒍊	U+1234A	URU x SIG_{4}			
𒍋	U+1234B	URU x TU	072		
𒍌	U+1234C	URU x U + GUD			
𒍍	U+1234D	URU x UD	077		
𒍎	U+1234E	URU x URUDA	075	41	BANŠUR
𒍏	U+1234F	URUDA	230	132	URUDU
𒍐	U+12350	URUDA x U	230		
𒍑	U+12351	UŠ	381	211	NITA
𒍒	U+12352	UŠ x A	384	211a	
𒍓	U+12353	UŠ x KU	383		
𒍔	U+12354	UŠ x KUR			
𒍕	U+12355	UŠ x TAK_{4}	382	51*	
𒍖	U+12356	UŠ_{X}	583	372	UZ, US, UŠ
𒍗	U+12357	UŠ_{2}		69	MŪTU, (m-w-t), (mawt), (mt), מָוֶת (mawet), Neo-Assyrian Aramaic: ܡܘܬܐ. See also: Middle Egyptian: 𓀐, Proto-Malayo-Polynesian: *(m-)atay
𒍘	U+12358	UŠUM_{X}			
𒍙	U+12359	UTUKI			
𒍚	U+1235A	UZ_{3}	203	122b	
𒍛	U+1235B	UZ_{3} x KASKAL	204	122c	
𒍜	U+1235C	UZU	311	171	
𒍝	U+1235D	ZA	851	586	
𒍞	U+1235E	ZA tenû	854	379; 380	AS_{4}, ERIM tenû
𒍟	U+1235F	ZA squared x KUR	855	531; 588	
𒍠	U+12360	ZAG	540	332	ZA_{3}
𒍡	U+12361	ZAM_{X}			
𒍢	U+12362	ZE_{2}	259	147	ZI_{2}, AB x PA
𒍣	U+12363	ZI	140	84	ZE_{1}, ZID, ZIG_{3}
𒍤	U+12364	ZI / ZI	101	66	
𒍥	U+12365	ZI_{3}		536	
𒍦	U+12366	ZIB	628	395	
𒍧	U+12367	ZIB KABA tenû			
𒍨	U+12368	ZIG	336	190	ZIK, NINDA x EŠ
𒍩	U+12369	ZIZ_{2}		339	
𒍪	U+1236A	ZU	015	006	SU, ṢU, ZU
𒍫	U+1236B	ZU_{5}			
𒍬	U+1236C	ZU_{5} x A			
𒍭	U+1236D	ZUBUR	648	364/5,2-3	
𒍮	U+1236E	ZUM	884	555	
𒍯	U+1236F	KAP ELAMITE			
𒍰	U+12370	AB x NUN			
𒍱	U+12371	AB_{2} x A			
𒍲	U+12372	AMAR x KUG			
𒍳	U+12373	DAG KISIM_{5} x U_{2} + MAŠ			
𒍴	U+12374	DAG_{3}			
𒍵	U+12375	DIŠ + ŠU			
𒍶	U+12376	DUB x ŠE			
𒍷	U+12377	EZEN x GUD			
𒍸	U+12378	EZEN x ŠE			
𒍹	U+12379	GA_{2} x AN + KAK + A			
𒍺	U+1237A	GA_{2} x AŠ_{2}			
𒍻	U+1237B	GE_{22}			
𒍼	U+1237C	GIG			
𒍽	U+1237D	ḪUŠ			
𒍾	U+1237E	KA x ANŠE			
𒍿	U+1237F	KA x AŠ_{3}			
𒎀	U+12380	KA x GIŠ			
𒎁	U+12381	KA x GUD			
𒎂	U+12382	KA x ḪI x AŠ_{2}			
𒎃	U+12383	KA x LUM			
𒎄	U+12384	KA x PA			
𒎅	U+12385	KA x ŠUL			
𒎆	U+12386	KA x TU			
𒎇	U+12387	KA x UR_{2}			
𒎈	U+12388	LAGAB x GI			
𒎉	U+12389	LU_{2} ŠEŠIG x BAD			
𒎊	U+1238A	LU_{2} x EŠ_{2} + LAL			
𒎋	U+1238B	LU_{2} x ŠU			
𒎌	U+1238C	MEŠ			
𒎍	U+1238D	MUŠ_{3} x ZA			
𒎎	U+1238E	NA_{4}			
𒎏	U+1238F	NIN			
𒎐	U+12390	NIN_{9}			
𒎑	U+12391	NINDA_{2} x BAL			
𒎒	U+12392	NINDA_{2} x GI			
𒎓	U+12393	NU_{11} rotated 90°			
𒎔	U+12394	PEŠ_{2}*			
𒎕	U+12395	PIR_{2}			
𒎖	U+12396	SAG x IGI gunû			
𒎗	U+12397	TI_{2}			
𒎘	U+12398	UM x ME			
𒎙	U+12399	U U			"TWENTY", "20"

== Code chart ==
Sumero-Akkadian Cuneiform script was added to the Unicode Standard in July, 2006 with the release of version 5.0.

The Unicode block for Sumero-Akkadian Cuneiform is U+12000–U+123FF:

Cuneiform^{[1]}^{[2]} Official Unicode Consortium code chart (PDF)
	0	1	2	3	4	5	6	7	8	9	A	B	C	D	E	F
U+1200x	𒀀	𒀁	𒀂	𒀃	𒀄	𒀅	𒀆	𒀇	𒀈	𒀉	𒀊	𒀋	𒀌	𒀍	𒀎	𒀏
U+1201x	𒀐	𒀑	𒀒	𒀓	𒀔	𒀕	𒀖	𒀗	𒀘	𒀙	𒀚	𒀛	𒀜	𒀝	𒀞	𒀟
U+1202x	𒀠	𒀡	𒀢	𒀣	𒀤	𒀥	𒀦	𒀧	𒀨	𒀩	𒀪	𒀫	𒀬	𒀭	𒀮	𒀯
U+1203x	𒀰	𒀱	𒀲	𒀳	𒀴	𒀵	𒀶	𒀷	𒀸	𒀹	𒀺	𒀻	𒀼	𒀽	𒀾	𒀿
U+1204x	𒁀	𒁁	𒁂	𒁃	𒁄	𒁅	𒁆	𒁇	𒁈	𒁉	𒁊	𒁋	𒁌	𒁍	𒁎	𒁏
U+1205x	𒁐	𒁑	𒁒	𒁓	𒁔	𒁕	𒁖	𒁗	𒁘	𒁙	𒁚	𒁛	𒁜	𒁝	𒁞	𒁟
U+1206x	𒁠	𒁡	𒁢	𒁣	𒁤	𒁥	𒁦	𒁧	𒁨	𒁩	𒁪	𒁫	𒁬	𒁭	𒁮	𒁯
U+1207x	𒁰	𒁱	𒁲	𒁳	𒁴	𒁵	𒁶	𒁷	𒁸	𒁹	𒁺	𒁻	𒁼	𒁽	𒁾	𒁿
U+1208x	𒂀	𒂁	𒂂	𒂃	𒂄	𒂅	𒂆	𒂇	𒂈	𒂉	𒂊	𒂋	𒂌	𒂍	𒂎	𒂏
U+1209x	𒂐	𒂑	𒂒	𒂓	𒂔	𒂕	𒂖	𒂗	𒂘	𒂙	𒂚	𒂛	𒂜	𒂝	𒂞	𒂟
U+120Ax	𒂠	𒂡	𒂢	𒂣	𒂤	𒂥	𒂦	𒂧	𒂨	𒂩	𒂪	𒂫	𒂬	𒂭	𒂮	𒂯
U+120Bx	𒂰	𒂱	𒂲	𒂳	𒂴	𒂵	𒂶	𒂷	𒂸	𒂹	𒂺	𒂻	𒂼	𒂽	𒂾	𒂿
U+120Cx	𒃀	𒃁	𒃂	𒃃	𒃄	𒃅	𒃆	𒃇	𒃈	𒃉	𒃊	𒃋	𒃌	𒃍	𒃎	𒃏
U+120Dx	𒃐	𒃑	𒃒	𒃓	𒃔	𒃕	𒃖	𒃗	𒃘	𒃙	𒃚	𒃛	𒃜	𒃝	𒃞	𒃟
U+120Ex	𒃠	𒃡	𒃢	𒃣	𒃤	𒃥	𒃦	𒃧	𒃨	𒃩	𒃪	𒃫	𒃬	𒃭	𒃮	𒃯
U+120Fx	𒃰	𒃱	𒃲	𒃳	𒃴	𒃵	𒃶	𒃷	𒃸	𒃹	𒃺	𒃻	𒃼	𒃽	𒃾	𒃿
U+1210x	𒄀	𒄁	𒄂	𒄃	𒄄	𒄅	𒄆	𒄇	𒄈	𒄉	𒄊	𒄋	𒄌	𒄍	𒄎	𒄏
U+1211x	𒄐	𒄑	𒄒	𒄓	𒄔	𒄕	𒄖	𒄗	𒄘	𒄙	𒄚	𒄛	𒄜	𒄝	𒄞	𒄟
U+1212x	𒄠	𒄡	𒄢	𒄣	𒄤	𒄥	𒄦	𒄧	𒄨	𒄩	𒄪	𒄫	𒄬	𒄭	𒄮	𒄯
U+1213x	𒄰	𒄱	𒄲	𒄳	𒄴	𒄵	𒄶	𒄷	𒄸	𒄹	𒄺	𒄻	𒄼	𒄽	𒄾	𒄿
U+1214x	𒅀	𒅁	𒅂	𒅃	𒅄	𒅅	𒅆	𒅇	𒅈	𒅉	𒅊	𒅋	𒅌	𒅍	𒅎	𒅏
U+1215x	𒅐	𒅑	𒅒	𒅓	𒅔	𒅕	𒅖	𒅗	𒅘	𒅙	𒅚	𒅛	𒅜	𒅝	𒅞	𒅟
U+1216x	𒅠	𒅡	𒅢	𒅣	𒅤	𒅥	𒅦	𒅧	𒅨	𒅩	𒅪	𒅫	𒅬	𒅭	𒅮	𒅯
U+1217x	𒅰	𒅱	𒅲	𒅳	𒅴	𒅵	𒅶	𒅷	𒅸	𒅹	𒅺	𒅻	𒅼	𒅽	𒅾	𒅿
U+1218x	𒆀	𒆁	𒆂	𒆃	𒆄	𒆅	𒆆	𒆇	𒆈	𒆉	𒆊	𒆋	𒆌	𒆍	𒆎	𒆏
U+1219x	𒆐	𒆑	𒆒	𒆓	𒆔	𒆕	𒆖	𒆗	𒆘	𒆙	𒆚	𒆛	𒆜	𒆝	𒆞	𒆟
U+121Ax	𒆠	𒆡	𒆢	𒆣	𒆤	𒆥	𒆦	𒆧	𒆨	𒆩	𒆪	𒆫	𒆬	𒆭	𒆮	𒆯
U+121Bx	𒆰	𒆱	𒆲	𒆳	𒆴	𒆵	𒆶	𒆷	𒆸	𒆹	𒆺	𒆻	𒆼	𒆽	𒆾	𒆿
U+121Cx	𒇀	𒇁	𒇂	𒇃	𒇄	𒇅	𒇆	𒇇	𒇈	𒇉	𒇊	𒇋	𒇌	𒇍	𒇎	𒇏
U+121Dx	𒇐	𒇑	𒇒	𒇓	𒇔	𒇕	𒇖	𒇗	𒇘	𒇙	𒇚	𒇛	𒇜	𒇝	𒇞	𒇟
U+121Ex	𒇠	𒇡	𒇢	𒇣	𒇤	𒇥	𒇦	𒇧	𒇨	𒇩	𒇪	𒇫	𒇬	𒇭	𒇮	𒇯
U+121Fx	𒇰	𒇱	𒇲	𒇳	𒇴	𒇵	𒇶	𒇷	𒇸	𒇹	𒇺	𒇻	𒇼	𒇽	𒇾	𒇿
U+1220x	𒈀	𒈁	𒈂	𒈃	𒈄	𒈅	𒈆	𒈇	𒈈	𒈉	𒈊	𒈋	𒈌	𒈍	𒈎	𒈏
U+1221x	𒈐	𒈑	𒈒	𒈓	𒈔	𒈕	𒈖	𒈗	𒈘	𒈙	𒈚	𒈛	𒈜	𒈝	𒈞	𒈟
U+1222x	𒈠	𒈡	𒈢	𒈣	𒈤	𒈥	𒈦	𒈧	𒈨	𒈩	𒈪	𒈫	𒈬	𒈭	𒈮	𒈯
U+1223x	𒈰	𒈱	𒈲	𒈳	𒈴	𒈵	𒈶	𒈷	𒈸	𒈹	𒈺	𒈻	𒈼	𒈽	𒈾	𒈿
U+1224x	𒉀	𒉁	𒉂	𒉃	𒉄	𒉅	𒉆	𒉇	𒉈	𒉉	𒉊	𒉋	𒉌	𒉍	𒉎	𒉏
U+1225x	𒉐	𒉑	𒉒	𒉓	𒉔	𒉕	𒉖	𒉗	𒉘	𒉙	𒉚	𒉛	𒉜	𒉝	𒉞	𒉟
U+1226x	𒉠	𒉡	𒉢	𒉣	𒉤	𒉥	𒉦	𒉧	𒉨	𒉩	𒉪	𒉫	𒉬	𒉭	𒉮	𒉯
U+1227x	𒉰	𒉱	𒉲	𒉳	𒉴	𒉵	𒉶	𒉷	𒉸	𒉹	𒉺	𒉻	𒉼	𒉽	𒉾	𒉿
U+1228x	𒊀	𒊁	𒊂	𒊃	𒊄	𒊅	𒊆	𒊇	𒊈	𒊉	𒊊	𒊋	𒊌	𒊍	𒊎	𒊏
U+1229x	𒊐	𒊑	𒊒	𒊓	𒊔	𒊕	𒊖	𒊗	𒊘	𒊙	𒊚	𒊛	𒊜	𒊝	𒊞	𒊟
U+122Ax	𒊠	𒊡	𒊢	𒊣	𒊤	𒊥	𒊦	𒊧	𒊨	𒊩	𒊪	𒊫	𒊬	𒊭	𒊮	𒊯
U+122Bx	𒊰	𒊱	𒊲	𒊳	𒊴	𒊵	𒊶	𒊷	𒊸	𒊹	𒊺	𒊻	𒊼	𒊽	𒊾	𒊿
U+122Cx	𒋀	𒋁	𒋂	𒋃	𒋄	𒋅	𒋆	𒋇	𒋈	𒋉	𒋊	𒋋	𒋌	𒋍	𒋎	𒋏
U+122Dx	𒋐	𒋑	𒋒	𒋓	𒋔	𒋕	𒋖	𒋗	𒋘	𒋙	𒋚	𒋛	𒋜	𒋝	𒋞	𒋟
U+122Ex	𒋠	𒋡	𒋢	𒋣	𒋤	𒋥	𒋦	𒋧	𒋨	𒋩	𒋪	𒋫	𒋬	𒋭	𒋮	𒋯
U+122Fx	𒋰	𒋱	𒋲	𒋳	𒋴	𒋵	𒋶	𒋷	𒋸	𒋹	𒋺	𒋻	𒋼	𒋽	𒋾	𒋿
U+1230x	𒌀	𒌁	𒌂	𒌃	𒌄	𒌅	𒌆	𒌇	𒌈	𒌉	𒌊	𒌋	𒌌	𒌍	𒌎	𒌏
U+1231x	𒌐	𒌑	𒌒	𒌓	𒌔	𒌕	𒌖	𒌗	𒌘	𒌙	𒌚	𒌛	𒌜	𒌝	𒌞	𒌟
U+1232x	𒌠	𒌡	𒌢	𒌣	𒌤	𒌥	𒌦	𒌧	𒌨	𒌩	𒌪	𒌫	𒌬	𒌭	𒌮	𒌯
U+1233x	𒌰	𒌱	𒌲	𒌳	𒌴	𒌵	𒌶	𒌷	𒌸	𒌹	𒌺	𒌻	𒌼	𒌽	𒌾	𒌿
U+1234x	𒍀	𒍁	𒍂	𒍃	𒍄	𒍅	𒍆	𒍇	𒍈	𒍉	𒍊	𒍋	𒍌	𒍍	𒍎	𒍏
U+1235x	𒍐	𒍑	𒍒	𒍓	𒍔	𒍕	𒍖	𒍗	𒍘	𒍙	𒍚	𒍛	𒍜	𒍝	𒍞	𒍟
U+1236x	𒍠	𒍡	𒍢	𒍣	𒍤	𒍥	𒍦	𒍧	𒍨	𒍩	𒍪	𒍫	𒍬	𒍭	𒍮	𒍯
U+1237x	𒍰	𒍱	𒍲	𒍳	𒍴	𒍵	𒍶	𒍷	𒍸	𒍹	𒍺	𒍻	𒍼	𒍽	𒍾	𒍿
U+1238x	𒎀	𒎁	𒎂	𒎃	𒎄	𒎅	𒎆	𒎇	𒎈	𒎉	𒎊	𒎋	𒎌	𒎍	𒎎	𒎏
U+1239x	𒎐	𒎑	𒎒	𒎓	𒎔	𒎕	𒎖	𒎗	𒎘	𒎙						
U+123Ax																
U+123Bx																
U+123Cx																
U+123Dx																
U+123Ex																
U+123Fx																
Notes 1.As of Unicode version 18.0 2.Grey areas indicate non-assigned code points

== History ==
The following Unicode-related documents record the purpose and process of defining specific characters in the Cuneiform block:

Version	Final code points (Note: Proposed code points and characters names may differ from final code points and names)	Count	L2 ID	WG2 ID	Document
5.0	U+12000..122D3, 122D6..1236E	877	L2/00-128		Bunz, Carl-Martin (2000-03-01), Scripts from the Past in Future Versions of Unicode
5.0	U+12000..122D3, 122D6..1236E	877	L2/00-153		Bunz, Carl-Martin (2000-04-26), Further comments on historic scripts
5.0	U+12000..122D3, 122D6..1236E	877	L2/00-398		Snyder, Dean (2000-11-07), Cuneiform: From Clay Tablet to Computer
5.0	U+12000..122D3, 122D6..1236E	877	L2/00-419	N2297	Everson, Michael (2000-11-20), Legacy cuneiform font implementations and the ICE project
5.0	U+12000..122D3, 122D6..1236E	877	L2/03-162	N2585	Everson, Michael; Feuerherm, Karljürgen (2003-05-25), Basic principles for the encoding of Sumero-Akkadian Cuneiform
5.0	U+12000..122D3, 122D6..1236E	877	L2/03-415		Snyder, Dean (2003-11-01), Proposal to Encode the Sumero-Akkadian Cuneiform Script in the UCS
5.0	U+12000..122D3, 122D6..1236E	877	L2/03-393R	N2664R	Everson, Michael; Feuerherm, Karljürgen; Tinney, Steve (2003-11-03), Preliminary proposal to encode Cuneiform script in the SMP of the UCS
5.0	U+12000..122D3, 122D6..1236E	877	L2/03-416		Anderson, Lloyd (2003-11-03), The Cuneiform Encoding Proposal -- a View of its Current Status
5.0	U+12000..122D3, 122D6..1236E	877	L2/04-080		Tinney, Steve (2004-01-24), Rationale for changes to N2664R
5.0	U+12000..122D3, 122D6..1236E	877	L2/04-036	N2698	Everson, Michael; Feuerherm, Karljürgen; Tinney, Steve (2004-01-29), Revised proposal to encode Cuneiform script in the SMP of the UCS
5.0	U+12000..122D3, 122D6..1236E	877	L2/04-041		Anderson, Lloyd (2004-01-29), Fitting Cuneiform Encoding to Cuneiform Script
5.0	U+12000..122D3, 122D6..1236E	877	L2/04-059		Feuerherm, Karljürgen (2004-01-30), Short Response to L2/04-041 "Fitting Cuneiform Encoding to Cuneiform Script"
5.0	U+12000..122D3, 122D6..1236E	877	L2/04-063		Gewecke, Tom (2004-01-30), Re: Cuneiform at UTC
5.0	U+12000..122D3, 122D6..1236E	877	L2/04-056		Veldhuis, Niek (2004-01-31), Letter re "Cuneiform Unicode"
5.0	U+12000..122D3, 122D6..1236E	877	L2/04-057		Jones, Charles E. (2004-02-01), Letter re "Cuneiform"
5.0	U+12000..122D3, 122D6..1236E	877	L2/04-058		Michalowski, Piotr (2004-02-01), Letter re "cuneiform unicode"
5.0	U+12000..122D3, 122D6..1236E	877	L2/04-064		Cooper, Jerry (2004-02-01), Letter re "unicode proposal"
5.0	U+12000..122D3, 122D6..1236E	877	L2/04-066		Durusau, Patrick (2004-02-02), Letter re "Proposal N2698"
5.0	U+12000..122D3, 122D6..1236E	877	L2/04-081		Black, Jeremy (2004-02-02), Letter re "cuneiform Unicode proposal"
5.0	U+12000..122D3, 122D6..1236E	877	L2/04-086		Anderson, Lloyd (2004-02-03), Notes for verbal presentation to UTC meeting, 3 February 2004
5.0	U+12000..122D3, 122D6..1236E	877	L2/04-099		Anderson, Lloyd (2004-02-09), Unification of cuneiform numbers
5.0	U+12000..122D3, 122D6..1236E	877	L2/04-225		Anderson, Lloyd (2004-06-07), Proposed modifications to introductory text of N2798 = L204-189 Proposal for Cuneiform Encoding
5.0	U+12000..122D3, 122D6..1236E	877	L2/04-189	N2786	Everson, Michael; Feuerherm, Karljürgen; Tinney, Steve (2004-06-08), Final proposal to encode Cuneiform script
5.0	U+12000..122D3, 122D6..1236E	877	L2/04-223R		Anderson, Lloyd (2004-06-11), Proposed modifications to delete and add signs to N2798 = L204-189 Proposal for Cuneiform Encoding
5.0	U+12000..122D3, 122D6..1236E	877	L2/04-354		McGowan, Rick (2004-09-20), Cuneiform Properties
5.0	U+12000..122D3, 122D6..1236E	877	L2/05-135		Tinney, Steve (2005-05-10), Corrections to N2786
5.0	U+12000..122D3, 122D6..1236E	877	L2/05-174		Everson, Michael (2005-07-28), Irish comments on Cuneiform
5.0	U+12000..122D3, 122D6..1236E	877	L2/05-108R		Moore, Lisa (2005-08-26), "Cuneiform (C.17)", UTC #103 Minutes
5.0	U+12000..122D3, 122D6..1236E	877		N2953 (pdf, doc)	Umamaheswaran, V. S. (2006-02-16), "M47.12", Unconfirmed minutes of WG 2 meeting 47, Sophia Antipolis, France; 2005-09-12/15
5.0	U+12000..122D3, 122D6..1236E	877	L2/12-328		Anderson, Deborah (2012-10-16), Numeric value fixes for two cuneiform characters
5.0	U+12000..122D3, 122D6..1236E	877	L2/24-074		Leroy, Robin (2024-03-16), On cuneiform UN and KALAM [Affects U+12326 and 12327]
5.0	U+12000..122D3, 122D6..1236E	877	L2/24-068		Anderson, Deborah; Goregaokar, Manish; Kučera, Jan; Whistler, Ken; Pournader, Roozbeh; Constable, Peter (2024-04-18), "5a Additions and Corrections [Affects U+12326 and 12327]", Recommendations to UTC #179 April 2024 on Script Proposals
5.0	U+12000..122D3, 122D6..1236E	877	L2/24-061		Constable, Peter (2024-04-29), "Section 5a Additions and Corrections [Affects U+12326 and 12327]", UTC #179 Minutes
5.0	U+122D4..122D5	2	L2/12-002	N4178R	Everson, Michael; Tinney, Steve (2012-01-16), Proposal for additions and corrections to Sumero-Akkadian Cuneiform
5.0	U+122D4..122D5	2	L2/12-207R	N4277R	Everson, Michael; Tinney, Steve (2012-07-31), Proposal for additions and corrections to Sumero-Akkadian Cuneiform
5.0	U+122D4..122D5	2	L2/12-239		Moore, Lisa (2012-08-14), "C.3", UTC #132 Minutes
7.0	U+1236F..12398	42	L2/12-002	N4178R	Everson, Michael; Tinney, Steve (2012-01-16), Proposal for additions and corrections to Sumero-Akkadian Cuneiform
7.0	U+1236F..12398	42	L2/12-207R	N4277R	Everson, Michael; Tinney, Steve (2012-07-31), Proposal for additions and corrections to Sumero-Akkadian Cuneiform
7.0	U+1236F..12398	42	L2/12-239		Moore, Lisa (2012-08-14), "C.3", UTC #132 Minutes
8.0	U+12399 (Note: See also L2/12-207R)	1	L2/13-196	N4493	Everson, Michael (2013-10-28), Request to add one Cuneiform character to the UCS
8.0	U+12399	1	L2/13-200		Moore, Lisa (2013-11-18), "C.8", UTC #137 Minutes
8.0	U+12399	1		N4553 (pdf, doc)	Umamaheswaran, V. S. (2014-09-16), "M62.01a, M62.01f", Minutes of WG 2 meeting 62 Adobe, San Jose, CA, USA

== See also ==
- List of cuneiform signs
