= Applied Research in Patacriticism =

University of Virginia laboratory

The Applied Research in Patacriticism (ARP) was a digital humanities lab based at the University of Virginia founded and run by Jerome McGann and Johanna Drucker. ARP's open-source tools include Juxta, IVANHOE, and Collex. Collex is the social software and faceted browsing backbone of the NINES federation. ARP was funded by the Mellon Foundation.

== Projects ==
=== IVANHOE ===
IVANHOE is an open source electronic role-playing game for educational use. It was developed by ARP at the University of Virginia. It is so named because Sir Walter Scott's novel, Ivanhoe, was used as the source text for the very first IVANHOE game. IVANHOE is notable as an example of the use of ludic or game-related techniques in higher education in the humanities.

=== NINES ===
NINES is the Networked Infrastructure for Nineteenth-century Electronic Scholarship, a scholarly organization in British and American nineteenth-century studies supported by ARP, a software development group assembling a suite of critical and editorial tools for digital scholarship. It was founded in 2003 by Jerome McGann at the University of Virginia.

NINES serves as a clearinghouse for peer-reviewed digital resources, which can be collected, annotated, and re-used in online "exhibits." It is powered by open-source Collex software.

In 2011, the NINES model was expanded to include a sister site in eighteenth-century studies, called 18thConnect.

=== Collex ===
Collex is an open source social software and faceted browsing tool designed for digital humanities. It includes folksonomy features and is under construction at ARP. The first release of Collex is used in the NINES initiative, but it is a generalizable tool that can be applied to other subject domains. Collex is an early example of a scholar-driven Library 2.0 initiative and, like NINES, was conceived as a response to economic problems in tenure and academic publishing.

=== Juxta ===
Juxta is an open-source tool for performing bibliographical collations for scholarly use in textual criticism. It was developed by ARP at the University of Virginia under the direction of textual theorist Jerome McGann. The original application was a Java-based client available for free download.

In October 2012, the Research and Development team at NINES released Juxta Commons, a fully online version of the software.

== Selected bibliography ==
- Jerome McGann, Texts in N-Dimensions and Interpretation in a New Key, in: Text Technology 12,2 (2003)
- Johanna Drucker, Designing Ivanhoe, in: Text Technology 12,2 (2003)
- Chandler Sansing, Case Study and Appeal: Building the Ivanhoe Game for Classroom Flexibility, in: Text Technology 12,2 (2003)
- Bethany Nowviskie, Subjectivity in the Ivanhoe Game:Visual and Computational Strategies, in: Text Technology 12,2 (2003)
