= Willard McCarty =

Willard McCarty is Professor of Humanities Computing in the Department of Digital Humanities at King's College London, England, where he is director of the doctoral programme in the department. He is a visiting professor in the Digital Humanities Research Group in the School of Humanities and Communication Arts at the University of Western Sydney, Australia. He is a Fellow of the Royal Anthropological Institute, London, and the editor of the Humanist Discussion Group established by him in 1987, dealing with humanities computing and the digital humanities.

== Academic career ==
He is the author of the book Humanities Computing and numerous scholarly articles and book chapters in the field. He is editor of the journal Interdisciplinary Science Reviews and founding editor of Humanist (electronic seminar). He has also conducted interviews with Digital Humanities researchers like John Burrows and Hugh Craig about network aspect in the research field.

He has received several honors and awards including the 2013 Roberto Busa Prize for lifetime achievement in the digital humanities and the 2006 Richard W. Lyman Award of the National Humanities Center. The Willard McCarty Fellowship was set up in 2018 by the Department of Digital Humanities at King's College London in honour of his contribution to the advances and growth of the field of Digital Humanities and the Department.
