= Jerome McGann =

American academic and textual scholar (born 1937)

Jerome John McGann
- Born: July 22, 1937 (age 89)
- Education: Le Moyne College (BS); Syracuse University (MA); Yale University (PhD)
- Occupations: Academic and textual scholar
- Spouse: Anne Lanni (m. 1960)
- Children: 3

Jerome John McGann (born July 22, 1937) is an American academic and textual scholar whose work focuses on the history of literature and culture from the late eighteenth century to the present.

His work comprises nearly 200 essays on humanities education, scholarship, and criticism. His books, many of which combine earlier essays with new material, address textual scholarship and editorial methods, poetry and poetics, and the relationship between Western cultural traditions and American history and culture.

== Career ==
McGann was educated at Le Moyne College (B.S. 1959), Syracuse University (M.A. 1962), and Yale University (Ph.D. 1966), McGann is University Professor Emeritus at the University of Virginia (1986–present), where he arrived after leaving Caltech.

McGann is a member of the American Philosophical Society and the American Academy of Arts and Sciences and has received honorary doctoral degrees from the University of Chicago (1996) and the University of Athens (2009). Other awards include: the Melville Cane Award, American Poetry Society, 1973, for his work on Swinburne as "The Year's Best Critical Book about Poetry"; the Distinguished Scholar Award from the Keats-Shelley Association of America (1989); the Distinguished Scholar Award from the Byron Society of America (1989); and the Wilbur Cross Medal, Yale University Graduate School, 1994.

In 2002 he was the recipient of three major awards: the Richard W. Lyman Award for Distinguished Contributions to Humanities Computing, National Humanities Center (as first award recipient); the James Russell Lowell Prize from the Modern Language Association for Radiant Textuality as the Most Distinguished Scholarly Book of the Year; and the Mellon Foundation Distinguished Achievement Award. In 2015 he received both the Richard J. Finneran Award from the Society for Textual Scholarship for A New Republic of Letters (Outstanding Book of 2014 devoted to Editorial Theory) and the James W. Gargano Award from the Poe Society of America for the outstanding essay on Poe published in 2014. He received the Thomas Jefferson Award from the University of Virginia in 2017.

He has been a Fulbright Fellow (1965–66), an American Philosophical Society Fellow (1967), and a Guggenheim Fellow (1970–71, 1976–77), and has been awarded NEH grants in 1975–76, 1987–89, and 2003–2006, as well as grants from the Getty Foundation, the Delmas Foundation, and the Mellon Foundation. He has held more than a dozen other appointments, including President of the Society for Textual Scholarship (1995–1997) and President of the Society for Critical Exchange (2005–06). Since 1999 he has been a Senior Research Fellow at the Institute of English Studies, University of London, and since 2000 a Senior Research Fellow at University College London. He served as a Senior Research Fellow at the University of California, Berkeley from 2009 to 2020, and held the Thomas Holloway Professorship of Victorian Media and Culture at Royal Holloway College, University of London in 2002.

== Academic work ==
McGann’s influence on literary and cultural studies began with two books he published in 1983, The Romantic Ideology and A Critique of Modern Textual Criticism. The Romantic Ideology argued that Romantic scholarship had uncritically absorbed the very ideological assumptions of the poetry it studied, and proved foundational to subsequent historicist approaches to Romanticism. A Critique of Modern Textual Criticism challenged prevailing editorial methodologies, particularly those derived from W. W. Greg and Fredson Bowers, and helped reshape the theory and practice of scholarly editing.

He served as editor of Lord Byron: The Complete Poetical Works (Clarendon Press, Oxford, 1980–1992, 7 vols.). He also edited The Oxford Authors Byron (Clarendon Press, 1986) and co-edited The Manuscripts of the Younger Romantics: Byron (Garland Publications, 1985–1988, 4 vols.). Later work includes Byron and Romanticism (Cambridge University Press, 2002) and Byron and the Poetics of Adversity (Cambridge University Press, 2023).

In the early 1990s he helped found the Institute for Advanced Technology in the Humanities (IATH) at the University of Virginia. His work at IATH, in particular the experimental editorial project The Complete Writings and Pictures of Dante Gabriel ROSSETTI, A Hypermedia Research Archive (1993-2008), was the practical ground for his investigations in material culture, traditional and digital, critical and editorial.

In 2001 and 2002 he co-founded, with Johanna Drucker and Bethany Nowviskie, both the Applied Research in Patacriticism digital laboratory and the Speculative Computing Laboratory (SPECLAB) at the University of Virginia. His book Radiant Textuality synthesized his thinking on digital editing and humanities computing.

In1967 at the University of Chicago, McGann co-founded, with the artist Virgil Burnett and the classical scholar Nicholas Rudall, the experimental theatre group Cain’s Company, named after their first production, Lord Byron's Cain, which they performed at the university's Rockefeller Chapel. His stage version of Thomas Lovell Beddoes's Death's Jest Book, directed by Frederick Burwick, was mounted in New York City at Fordham University's Pope Auditorium in 2003, and McGann’s stage version of Byron’s Manfred was abandoned when his collaborator, Virgil Burnett, died in 2012.

McGann's work on American literature includes studies of Edgar Allan Poe and American literary and cultural history, as well as an edition of Martin Delany's Blake; or The Huts of America. He has also published eight books of poetry and collaborated with artists and small presses. He retired from academia in 2022.

== Personal life ==
McGann has been married to Anne Lanni since 1960 and has three children.

== Selected bibliography ==
- The Romantic Ideology: A Critical Investigation (1983)
- A Critique of Modern Textual Criticism (1983)
- The Beauty of Inflections: Literary Investigations in Historical Method and Theory (1985)
- Social Values and Poetic Acts: The Historical Judgment of Literary Work (1988)
- The Textual Condition (1991)
- Radiant Textuality: Literature Since the World Wide Web (2001)
- Byron and Romanticism (2002)
- The Point Is To Change It: Poetry and Criticism in the Continuing Present (2007)
- A New Republic of Letters: Memory and Scholarship in the Age of Digital Reproduction' (2014)
- The Poet Edgar Allan Poe. Alien Angel (2014)
- Culture and Language at Crossed Purposes: The Unsettled Records of American Settlement (2022)
- Transubstantiations: Poetry & Verse (2025)
- What Language for Prophets and/or Loss (2026)

=== Selected Interviews and Reviews ===
- Scott Pound, "The Amoderns: Towards Philology in a New Key," Amodern (2013)
- Susan Greenberg, "Jerome McGann on Editing," in Editors Talk About Editing, ed. Susan L. Greenberg (Peter Lang, 2015): 53–71
- Martin Paul Eve, review of A New Republic of Letters, Alexandria 26.1 (2016): 61–70
- Matheus de Brito, "The ghost within the ghost in the machine": An Interview with Jerome McGann (2016)
- Stephen Earnshaw and Philip Shaw, interview with McGann, The Cambridge Quarterly 22.4 (1993): 355–69
- "An interview with Jerome McGann on textual scholarship as literary history and ideology critique," Social Epistemology 1.2 (1987): 163–173

=== Selected Autobiographical Essays ===
- "The Poverty of Theory; or, The Education of Jerome McGann," in Theory Development in the Human Sciences, ed. Diane H. Sonnenwald (University of Texas Press, 2016): 241–263
- "Truth and Method: Humanities Scholarship as a Science of Exceptions," Interdisciplinary Science Reviews 40.2 (2015): 204–218
