= Cuneiform Digital Library Initiative =

International digital library project

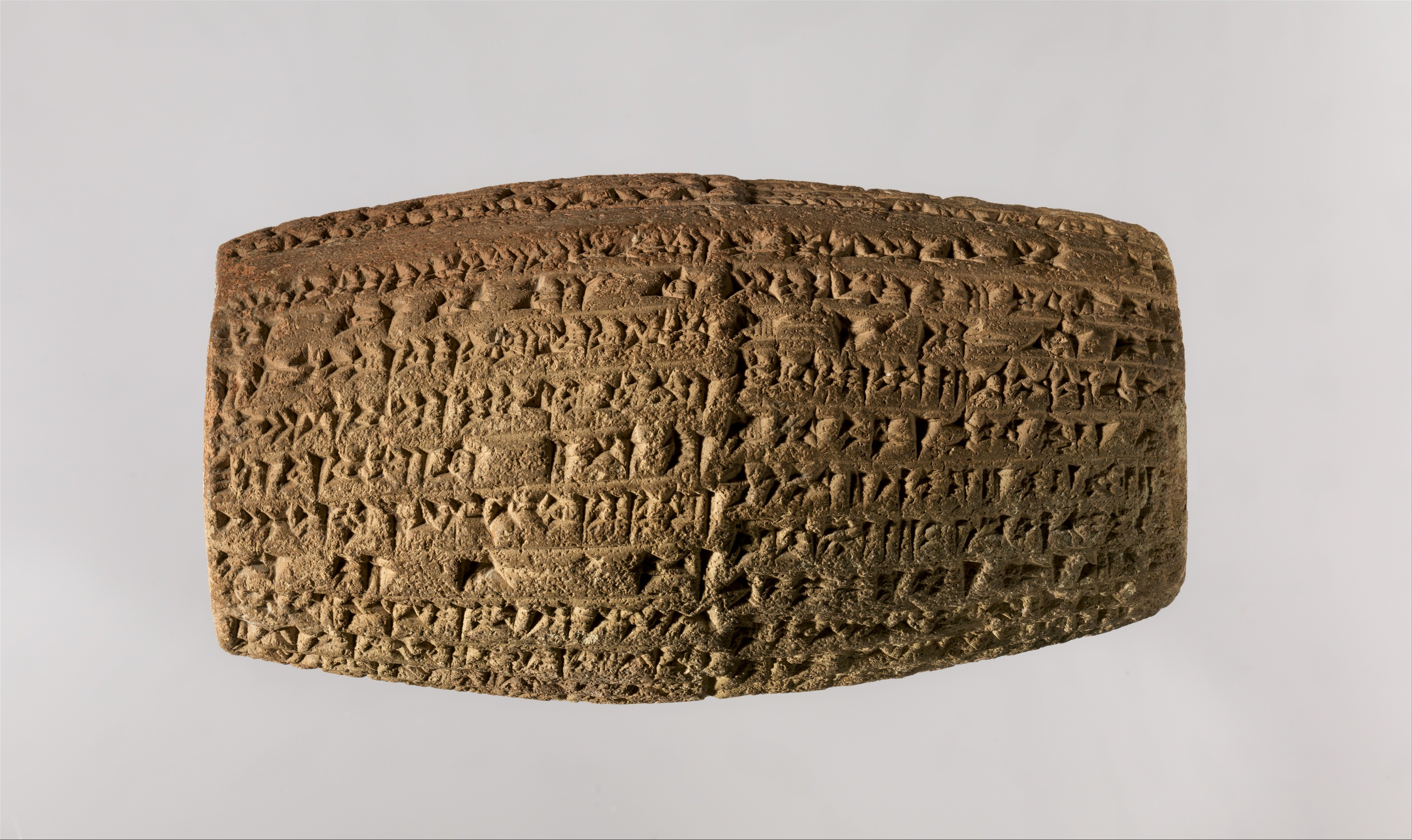
Clay cylinder from the Metropolitan Museum of Art, New York, New York, USA. Indexed as part of the Cuneiform Digital Library Initiative.

The Cuneiform Digital Library Initiative (CDLI) is an international digital library project aimed at putting text and images of an estimated 500,000 recovered cuneiform tablets created from between roughly 3350 BC and the end of the pre-Christian era online. Directors of the project are Robert Keith Englund from University of California, Los Angeles and Jürgen Renn of the Max Planck Institute for the History of Science. Co-principal investigators are Jacob Dahl at Oxford University, Bertrand Lafront at the Centre national de la recherche scientifique, Nanterre and Émilie Pagé-Perron, University of Toronto. Preceding leadership comprised co-director Peter Damerow (1939–2011) from the Max Planck Institute for the History of Science and Pennsylvania Sumerian Dictionary leader Stephen J. Tinney who was co-principal investigator. In 2004, Englund received the Richard W. Lyman Award from the National Humanities Center for his work on the initiative.

The project began in 1998, but it was not until 2000 that it obtained funds for three years from the National Endowment for the Humanities and the National Science Foundation's Digital Libraries Initiative. This phase consisted of digitizing and progressively putting online the collections of the Vorderasiatisches Museum (online in 2001), the Institut Catholique de Paris (online in 2002), the Hermitage Museum and the Phoebe A. Hearst Museum of Anthropology (online in 2003), and the University of Pennsylvania Museum of Archaeology and Anthropology. A second phase from 2004 to 2006 was federally funded by the National Endowment for the Humanities and the Institute of Museum and Library Services, during which time it focused on new educational components and scalable access systems to the data.
