= Richard W. Lyman Award =

The Richard W. Lyman Award was presented for five years, from 2002 to 2006, by the National Humanities Center. It recognized scholars who have advanced the humanities through the use of information technology, and was given only to male recipients

Another award with the same name was started in 1983 by Stanford University.

Both awards are named after Professor Richard Wall Lyman.

== Award recipients ==
=== Awarded by National Humanities Center ===
- 2002 Jerome McGann
- 2003 Roy Rosenzweig
- 2004 Robert K. Englund
- 2005 John M. Unsworth
- 2006 Willard McCarty

=== Recently awarded by Stanford University ===
- 2011 Lyman Van Slyke
- 2012 Hank Greely
- 2013 Larry Diamond
- 2015 Jeffrey R. Koseff
- 2016 James Fox
- 2017 Abbas Milani
- 2018 Tina Seelig
- 2019 Michael McFaul
- 2020 None
- 2021 Elizabeth A. Hadly
- 2022 Christopher Gardner
- 2023 Elaine Treharne

== See also ==
- List of computer-related awards
