= Humanist (electronic seminar) =

Humanist is an international electronic seminar on humanities computing and the digital humanities, in the form of a long-running electronic mailing list and its associated archive. The primary aim of Humanist is to provide a forum for discussion of intellectual, scholarly, pedagogical, and social issues and for exchange of information among members.

Humanist is also a publication of the Alliance of Digital Humanities Organizations (ADHO) and the Office for Humanities Communication (OHC) and an affiliated publication of the American Council of Learned Societies (ACLS). In 2008, there were 1650 subscribers.

== History ==
The Humanist list was created in 1987 by Willard McCarty, then at the University of Toronto, as a BITNET (NetNorth in Canada) electronic mail newsletter for people who support computing in the humanities for the Association for Literary and Linguistic Computing. McCarty, later at King's College London, continued to edit it.

Although Humanist started off as a means of communication for people directly involved in the support of humanities computing, it grew in scope to become an extended conversation about the nature of "humanities computing" (or "digital humanities", or one of a contested range of other names), about what computing looks like viewed from the humanities, and humanities from computing: "Humanist remains the forum within which the technology, informed by the concerns of humane learning, can be viewed from an interdisciplinary common ground."

As of 12 August 2020 the list went on hiatus for "a few weeks" for technical improvements. However, in February 2021 the list eventually moved to a new infrastructure, hosted at the University of Cologne, Germany.
