= Warfare in Sumer =

Type of conflict

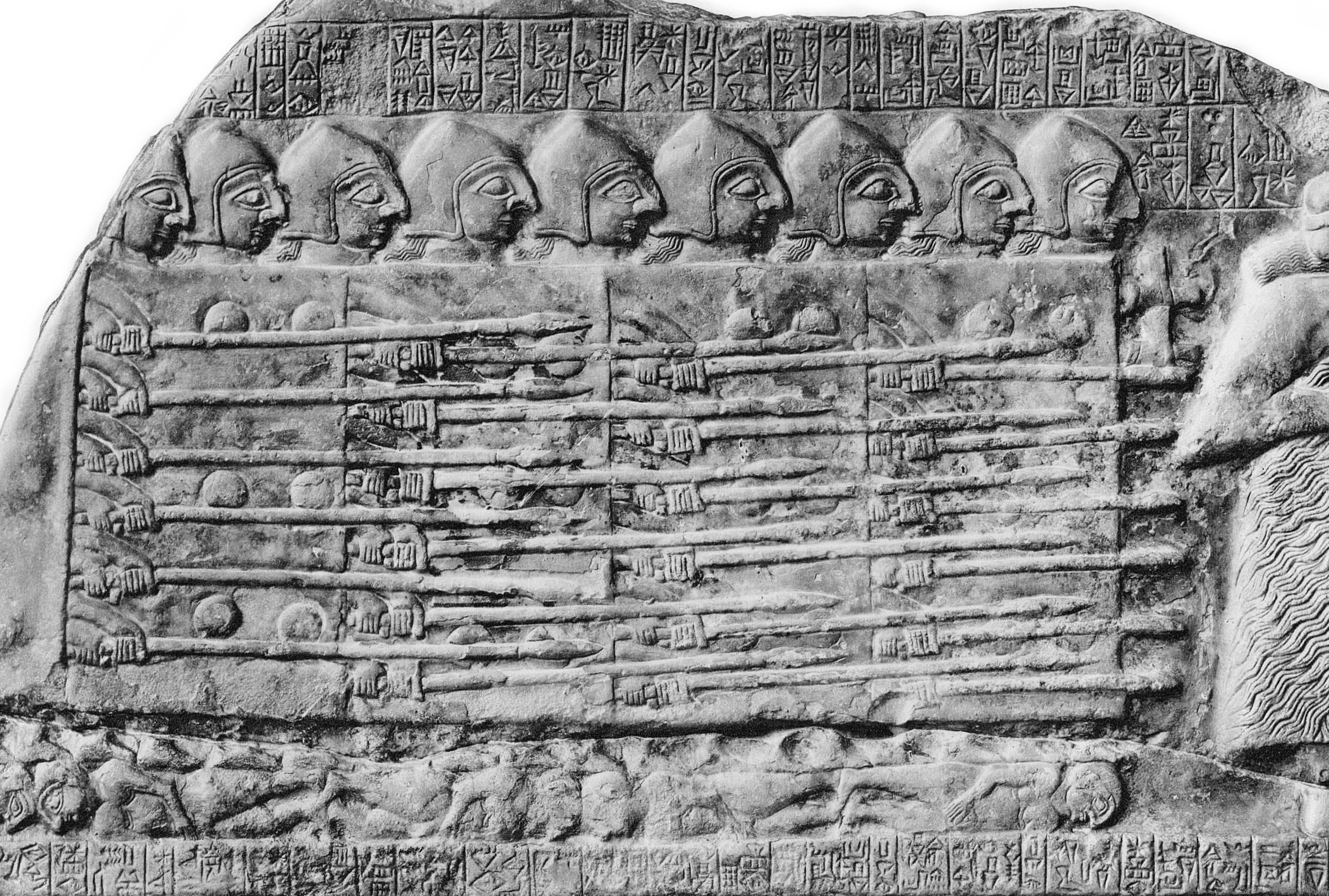
Phalanx on the Stele of the Vultures

Warfare in Sumer predominantly consisted of small-scale conflicts between nearby city-states. Sumerian armies consisted of bronze-armoured soldiers armed with various weapons, including spears, swords and sickle-swords, engaging each other in phalanx-like formations. When besieging cities, battering rams and sappers would be used to breach the defences; on the open battlefield, chariots were also used. Most wars were fought because of inter-city rivalries, or for wealth, resources, and prestige. Military victories were later glorified in Mesopotamian art — a major source of historical information.

== History ==
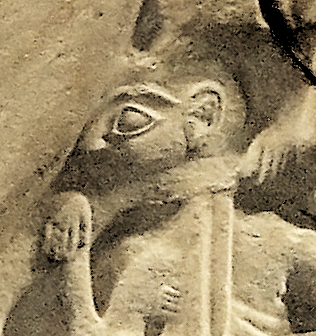
A prisoner of war from Umma

=== Weapons and Tactics ===
Soldiers in ancient Mesopotamia militaries were well-trained and well-equipped. Archaeological studies show that the Sumerians used war-carts and iron or bronze weapons; most soldiers used axes, daggers, and spears; units with spears would be organized into close-order formations. Armor included copper and bronze helmets, as well as bronze armor and cloaks studded in metal discs, although some depictions of light infantry show them without armor, only wearing skirts adorned with feathers. The oldest known helmet ever, the Golden Wig, was made of beaten and engraved gold with a wadded linen liner. Bronze and copper alloy helmets dating back to 2500 BCE have also been found. By 2100 BCE, bronze scale armor had developed.

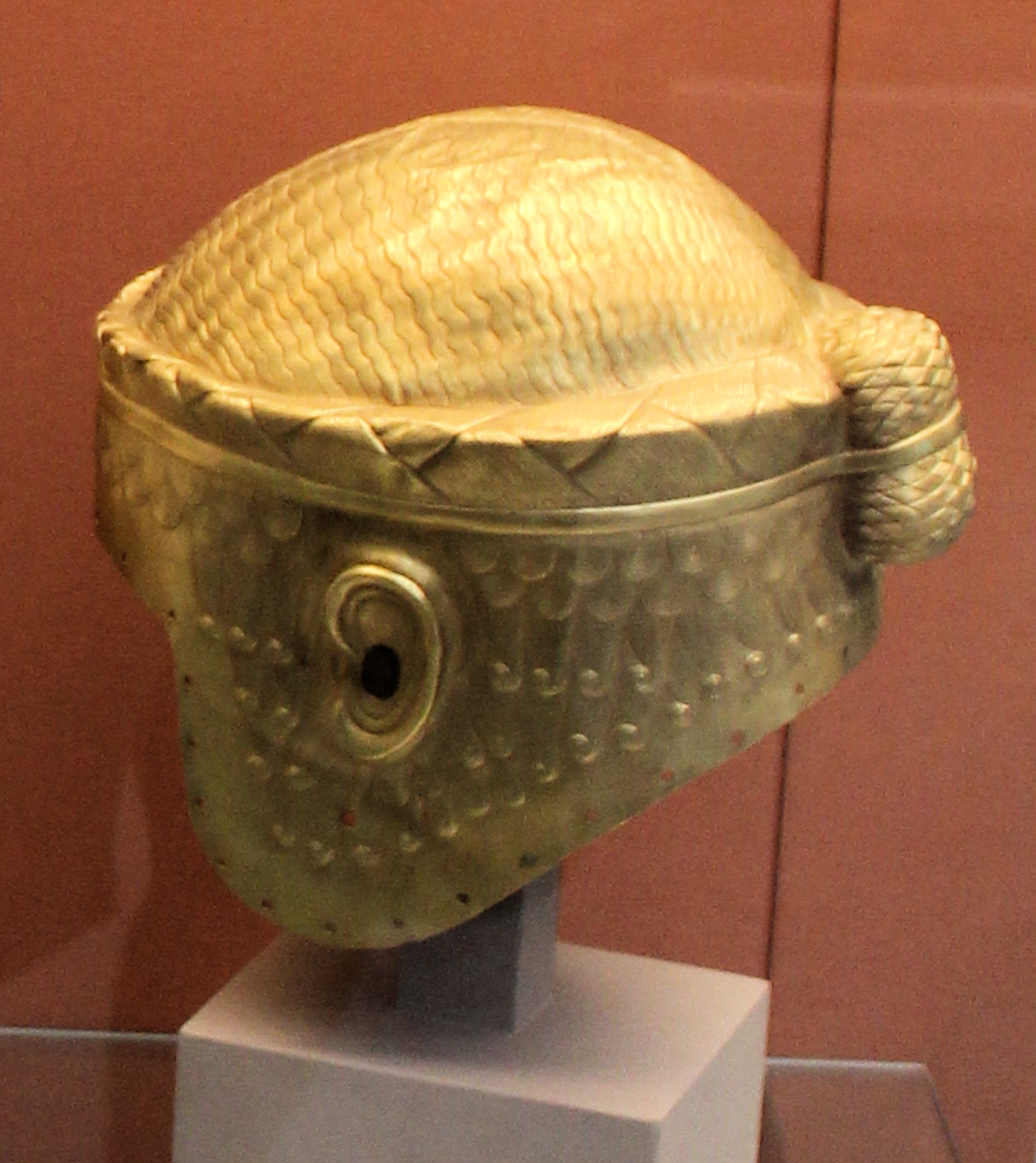
Back view of the Meskalamdug Helmet.

To support the main army there would be light infantry equipped with javelins and bows. Sumerian soldiers used basic bows before the Akkadian Empire, but Sargon's empire spread the composite bow throughout Mesopotamia. It is likely the bow was given to the Akkadians by nomadic peoples; it became a very important Mesopotamian weapon, and many soldiers used them. The armies also contained small war wagons, which generally had a crew of two: a rider and a warrior. They were pulled by donkeys, mules, or crossbreeds; horses were not introduced before the 2nd millennium BCE and when present may have been too expensive outside of elite units.

During the Uruk Period of Sumerian history, jobs in Sumeria became more specialized. Leading to city-states forming armies. The armies of Sumer could have thousands of soldiers; some city states could field armies five thousand or six thousand men strong. In ancient Sumerian militaries, the king was the supreme commander of the army. However, smaller units were commanded by lower ranking officers. Generals were valued in the ancient Akkadian military. Sargon of Akkad appointed one of his generals to the position of Sagi-mah or chief cupbearer. Other known units include the Shub-Lugal, which served as household troops and made up the majority of Sargon's army.

=== Causes and conflicts ===
One common cause for war was rivalries between city states, often caused by previous conflicts. For example, Umma and Lagash waged several wars against each other, while the cities of Ur, Uruk, and Kish all rivaled each other. Wars were often started as one city-state tried to secure greater power — a legendary example is Gilgamesh, king of Uruk, declining to become a vassal of Kish. Records show that some wars were started to control trade routes and their valuable resources. King Meskiaggasher fought wars in the Zagros Mountains for timber, metal, and stone, while Sumerian myths recording wars against the mythical kingdom of Aratta most likely represent real campaigns in Iran for Lapis Lazuli and tin. Elamites and Gutians would often raid the city-states' vital supply routes; many city-states formed military alliances to defend against such raiding. It is probable that over time, inhabitants of villages migrated to the cities, because the cities provided greater protection, causing the rural population to shrink. Victory in war brought prestige and wealth to the king of the victorious city.

During the Early Dynastic Period, there were an increasing number of wars between rival Sumerian city-states. These wars were very small-scale: the cities of Umma and Lagash, who fought many wars against each other, are only 25 miles apart. Most battles took place only a few days march from each involved city-state. One war known to have taken place over a comparatively long distance, was between Kish and Elam, who were located 160 miles apart. Modern historians know very little about the tactics of Sumerian armies because records glorify victories, but rarely talk about how the battle was fought. Sumerian soldiers would besiege cities using battering rams and sappers while the defenders built towers. Although the walls of some ancient Sumerian cities may not have initially served as defensive fortifications, being originally designed to protect cities from wild animals and floods, and to demonstrate the power and wealth of a settlement, they eventually took on a defensive aspect; moats also become widely used in the 13th century B.C. Once a city was captured, its walls would be destroyed in order to humiliate the city, which was also looted. A large section of the population would often be captured and enslaved, while the victor would dedicate the spoils of war to the patron deity of their city.

== Depictions ==
The Royal Standard of Ur

Depictions of warfare are a common theme in Mesopotamian art. Usually the art, commissioned by the victors, would celebrate and glorify a military victory. Some notable examples are the Royal Standard of Ur and the Steele of the Vultures: the Royal Standard depicts soldiers, led by the king of Ur, marching over the corpses of their enemy, while others drag prisoners of war behind them; while the Steele of Vultures depicts the king of Lagash defeating the king of Umma, soldiers marching in a phalanx-like formation, and vultures carrying the severed heads of the soldiers from Umma, who had fallen in heaps in front of the soldiers from Lagash. Epigraphy and archaeological records show other depictions of warfare.

Warfare and violence are common themes in Mesopotamian literature. Military campaigns were a frequent subject. Often, writers praised wars and battles, describing the conquests as glorious, or glorifying the wealth garnered from looting. One royal inscription from the Akkadian Empire describes the campaigns of King Manishtushu. It reads: "Manishtushu, king of the world; when he conquered Anshan and Shirihum, had ships cross the Lower Sea. The cities across the sea, thirty-two [in number], assembled for battle, but he was victorious [over them]. Further, he conquered their cities, struck down their rulers, and after, he roused his troops, plundered as far as the Silver Mines. He quarried the black stone of the mountains across the Lower Sea, loaded it on ships, and moored [the ships] at the quay of Agade."
