= Eshpum =

Eshpum 𒀹𒅗
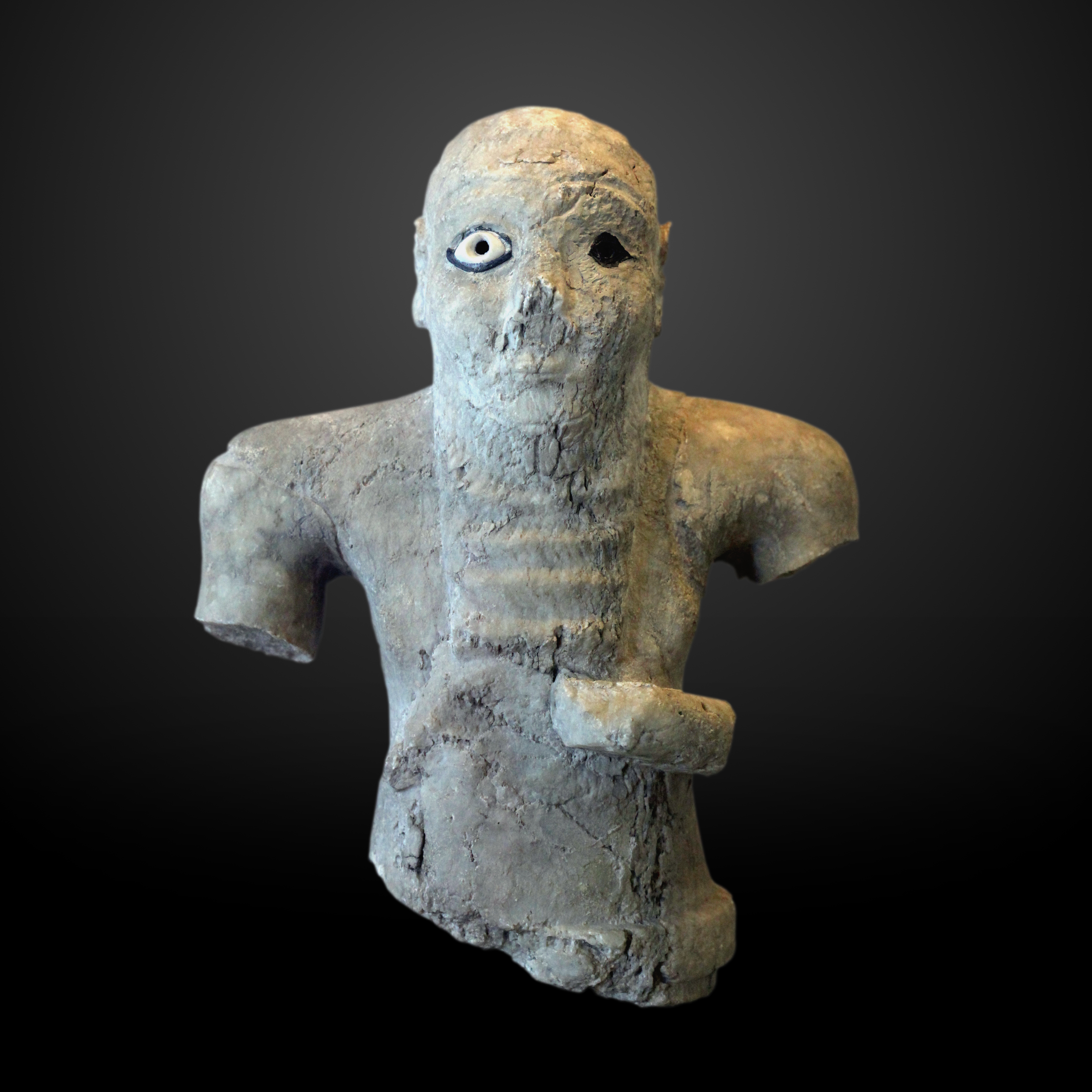
- Archaic Mesopotamian statue of an orant dated to c. 2700 BCE, rededicated by Eshpum, governor de Susa and vassal the king of Akkad, Manishtusu (2275–2260 BCE), to Elamite goddess Narundi. Found in Susa. Louvre Museum, Sb 82.

Governor of Elam
- Reign: c. 2269 – c. 2255 BC
- Died: c. 2255 BC

Eshpum (𒀹𒅗 esh18-pum, formerly read Geba; died c. 2255 BC) was an Akkadian Governor of Elam around 2269–2255 BC.

== Reign ==
In the Akkadian Empire he was a vassal of king Manishtushu.

While Eshpum was in charge of Elam, another Governor of Manistushu named Ilshu-rabi was in charge of Pashime, in the coastal area.

== Attestations ==
=== Votive statue ===
An archaic statue of an orant is known, which was re-dedicated about 500 years later by Eshpum. It reads:

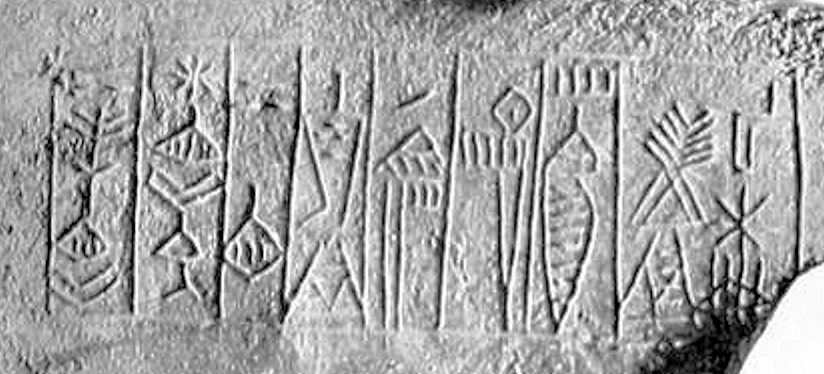
Eshpum votive statue inscription

𒈠𒀭𒅖𒌅𒋢 / 𒈗 / 𒆧 / 𒀹𒅗 / 𒀵𒋢 / 𒀀𒈾 / 𒀭𒈾𒊒𒋾 / 𒀀𒈬𒈾𒊒

"ma-an-isz-tu-su / lugal / kish / esh18-pum / ARAD2-su / a-na / {d}na-ru-ti / a mu-na-ru
For Manishtushu king of Kish, Eshpum his servant, dedicated this statue to Narundi"

— Inscription of Eshpum on the statue of the orant. Louvre Museum Sb 82.

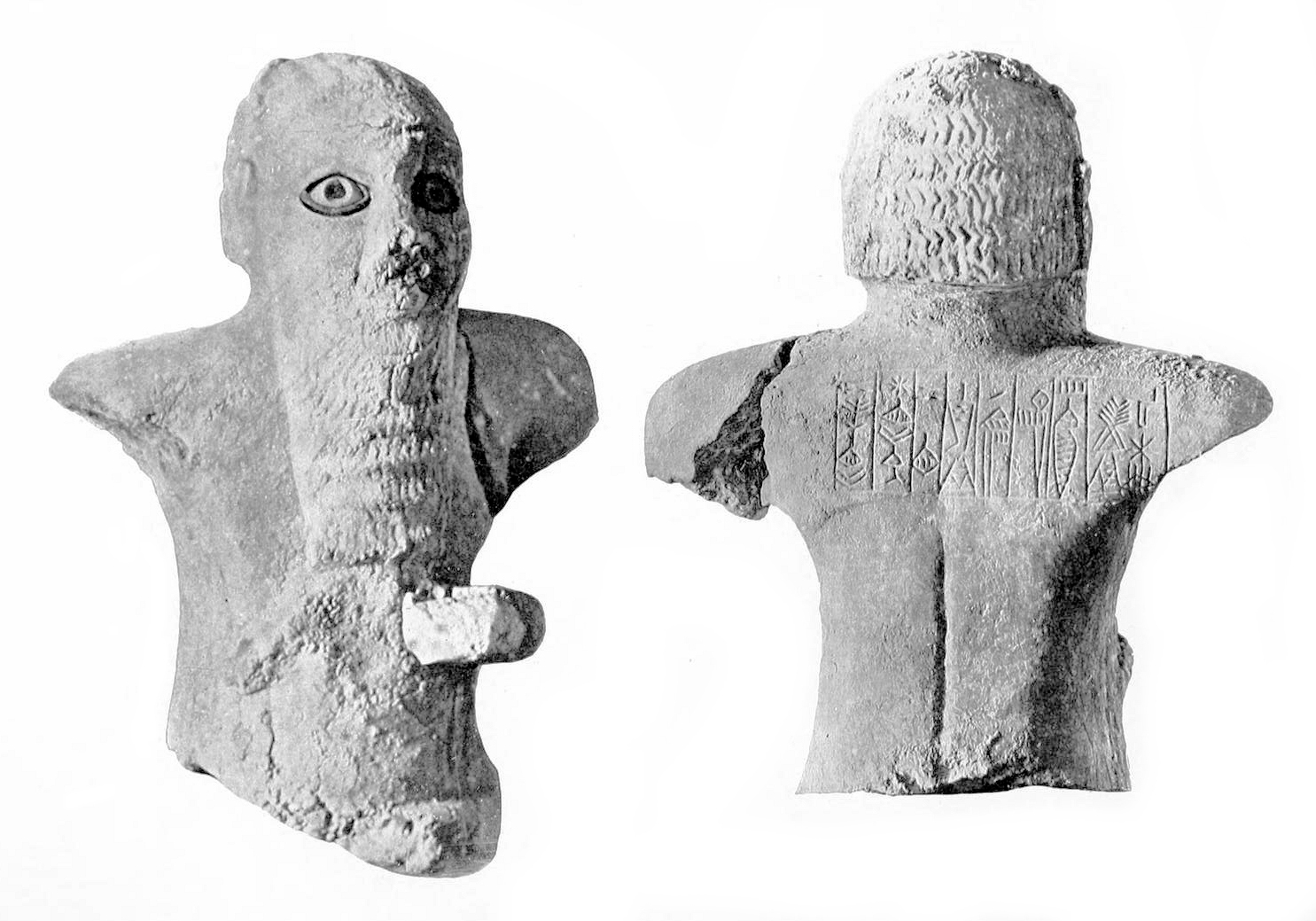
Archaic votive statue (c. 2700 BCE) dedicated by Eshpum, with his inscription in the back

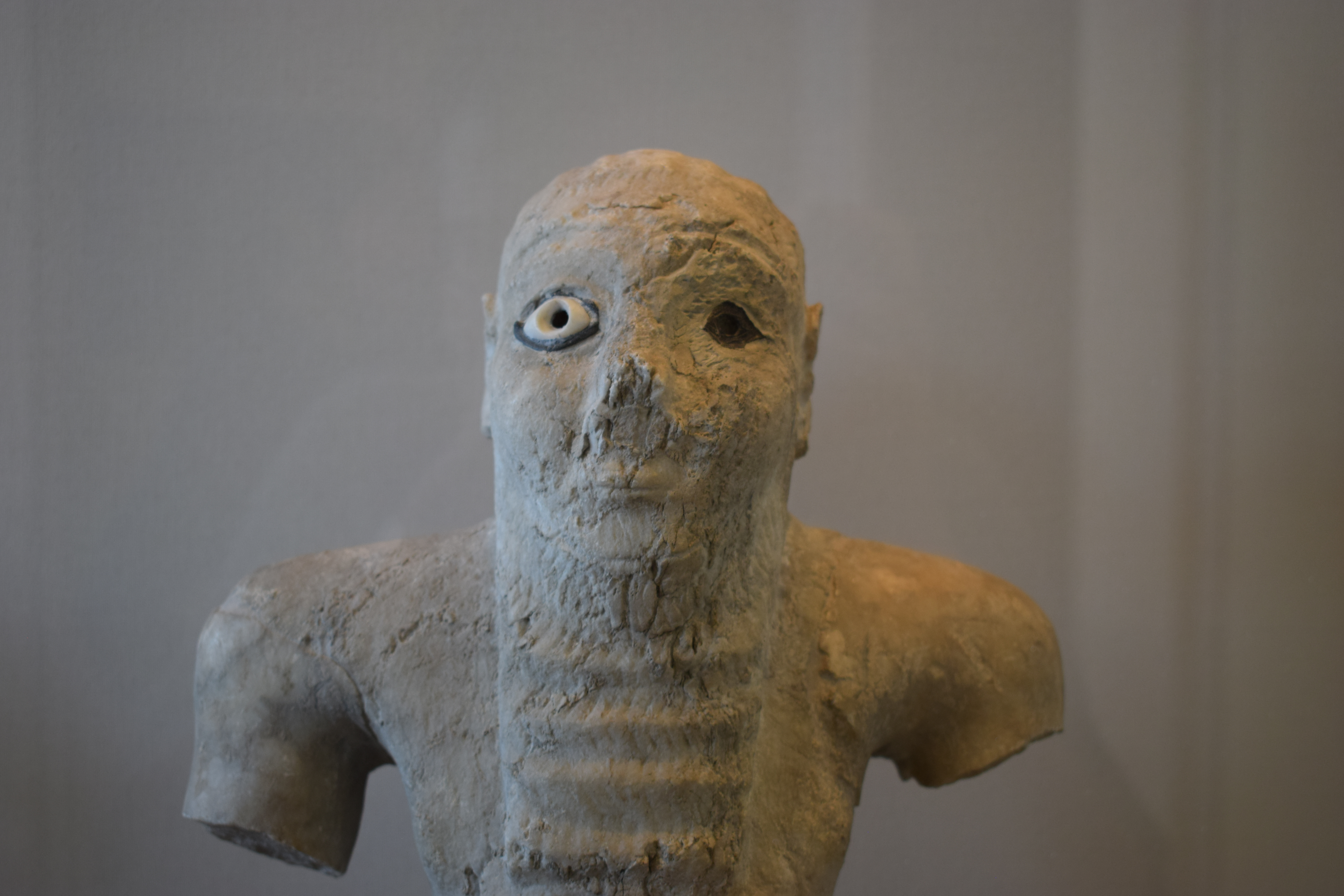
Detail of the statue

=== Seal inscriptions ===
==== "Eshpum, Governor of Elam" ====
Another inscription of Eshpum is known, which reads "Eshpum, Governor of Elam" (𒀹𒅗 𒑐𒋼𒋛 𒉏𒈠𒆠 esz18-pum ensi2 elam{ki}).

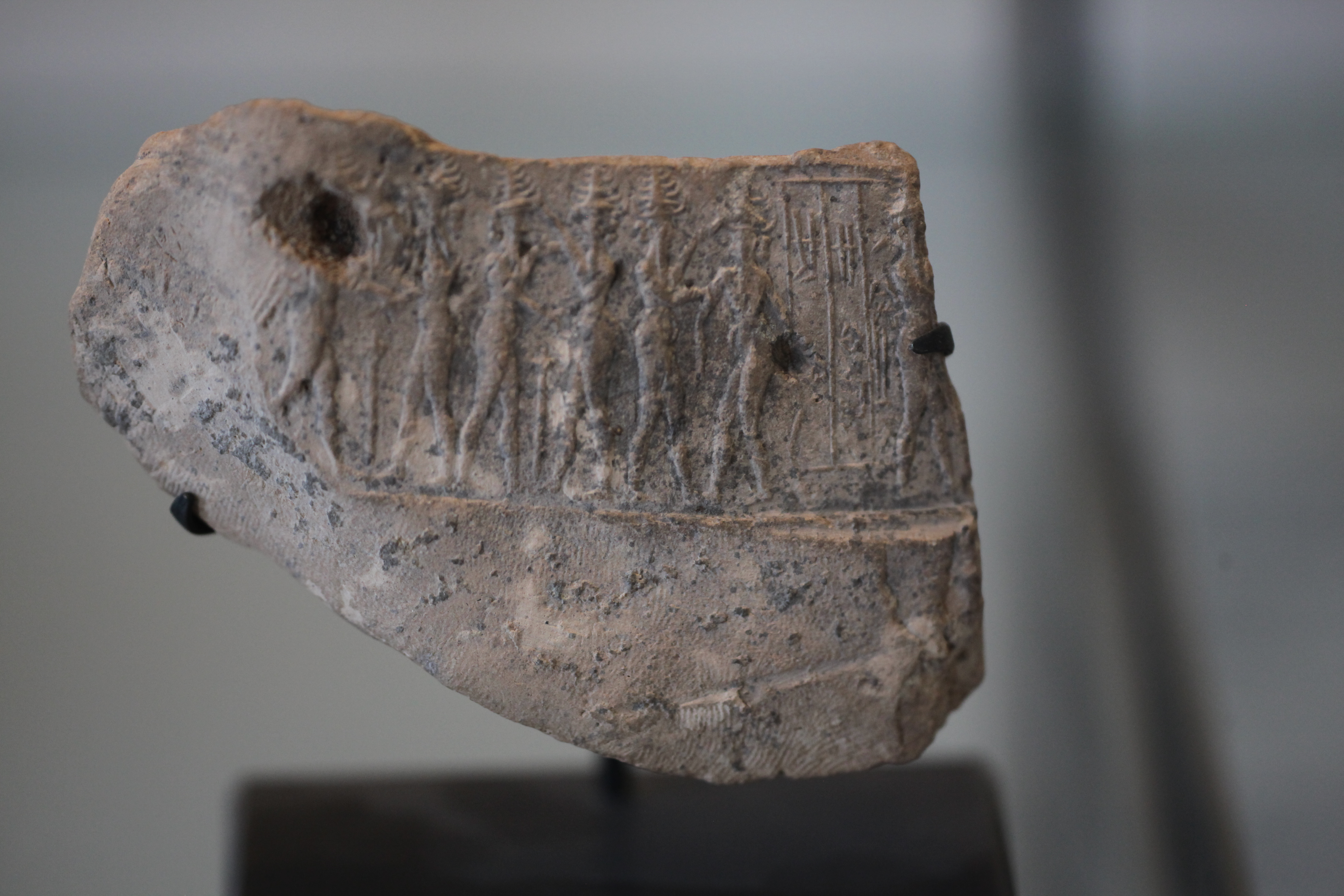
Seal impression with inscription "Eshpum Governor of Elam" (𒀹𒅗 𒑐𒋼𒋛 𒉏𒈠𒆠 esz18-pum ensi2 elam{ki}). Louvre Museum, Sb 6675.

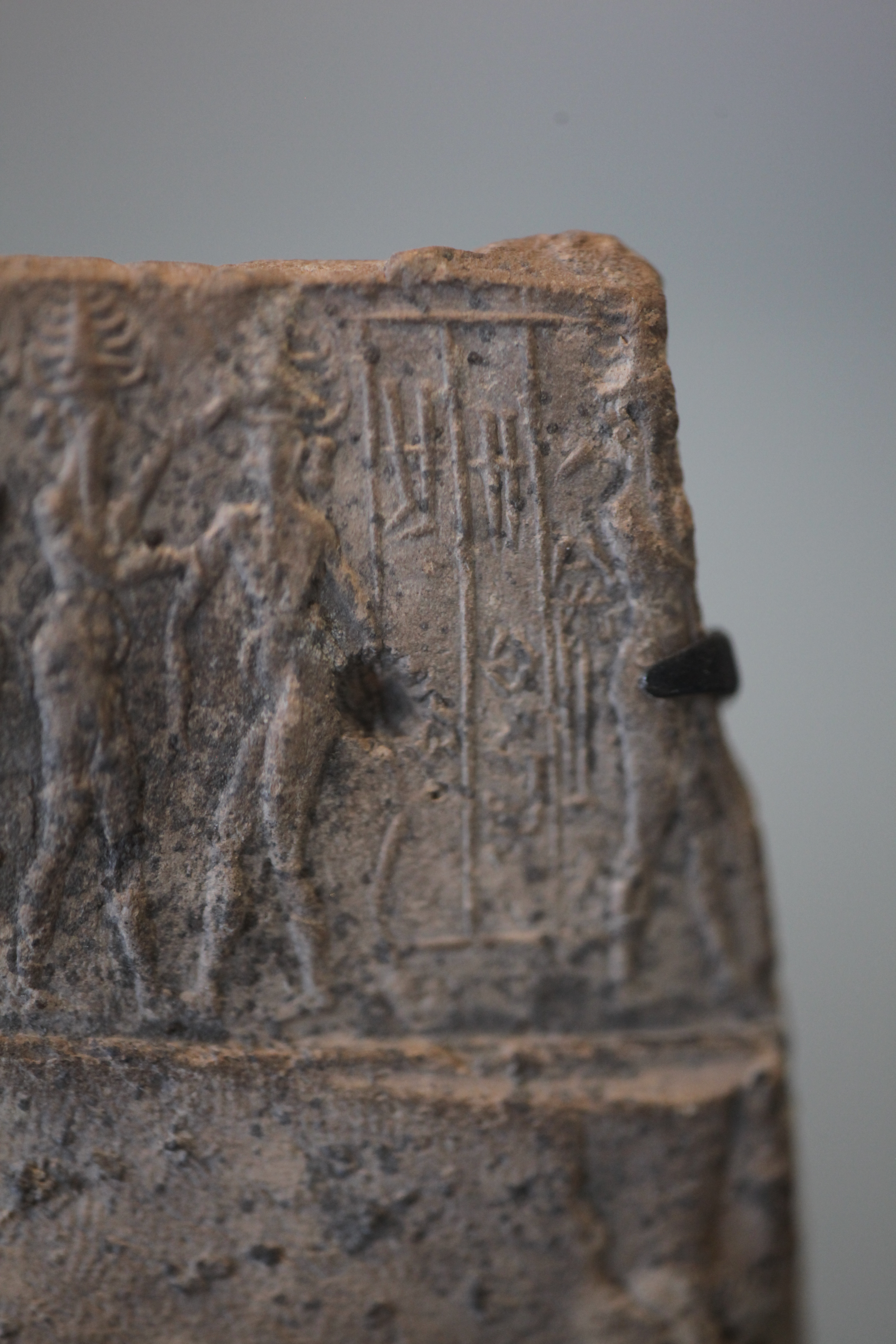
Detail of the seal impression with inscription "Eshpum Governor of Elam" (𒀹𒅗 𒑐𒋼𒋛 𒉏𒈠𒆠 esz18-pum ensi2 elam{ki}). Louvre Museum, Sb 6675.

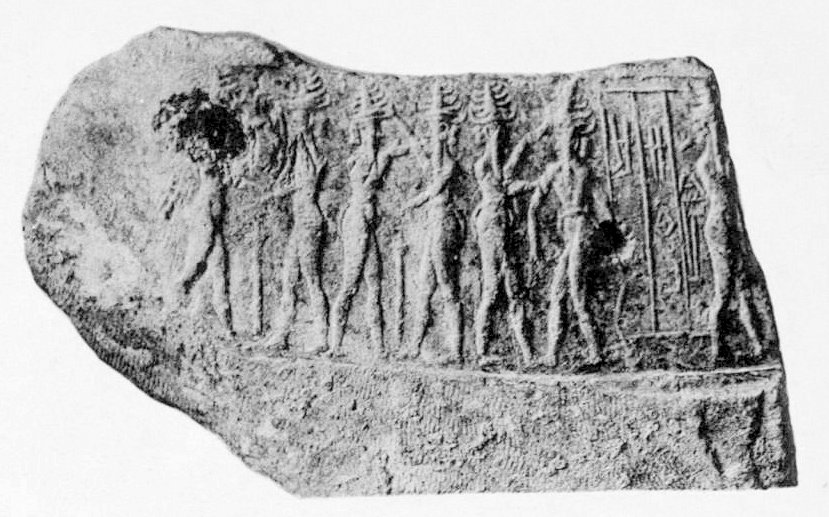
Seal of Eshpum

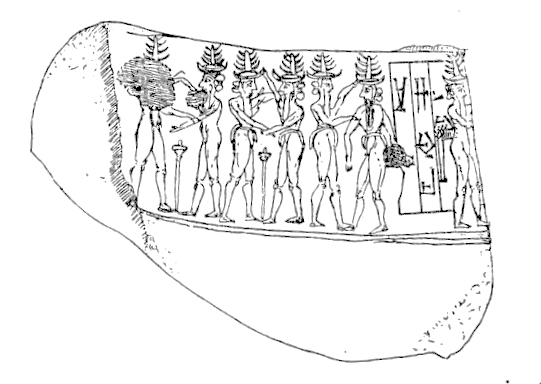
Seal impression, with inscription "Eshpum, Governor of Elam" (Eshpum Ensi Nim-ki)

==== "Egigi, servant of Eshpum" ====
A seal only known from fragments, was made in the name of "Egigi, the fortune teller, servant of Eshpum".

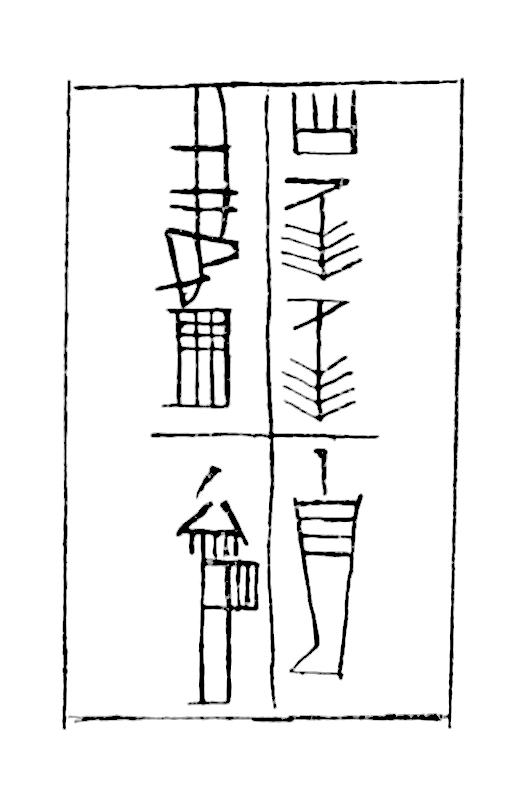
"Egigi the fortune teller, servant of Eshpum".

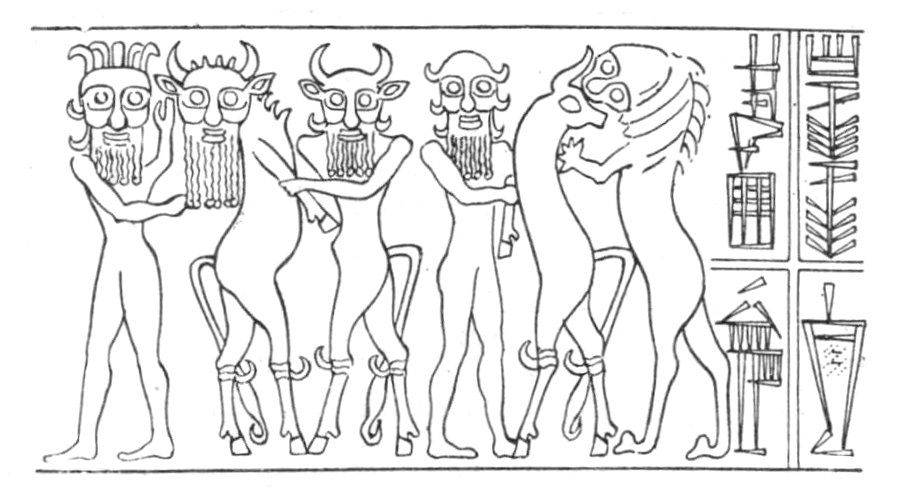
"Egigi the fortune teller, servant of Eshpum".

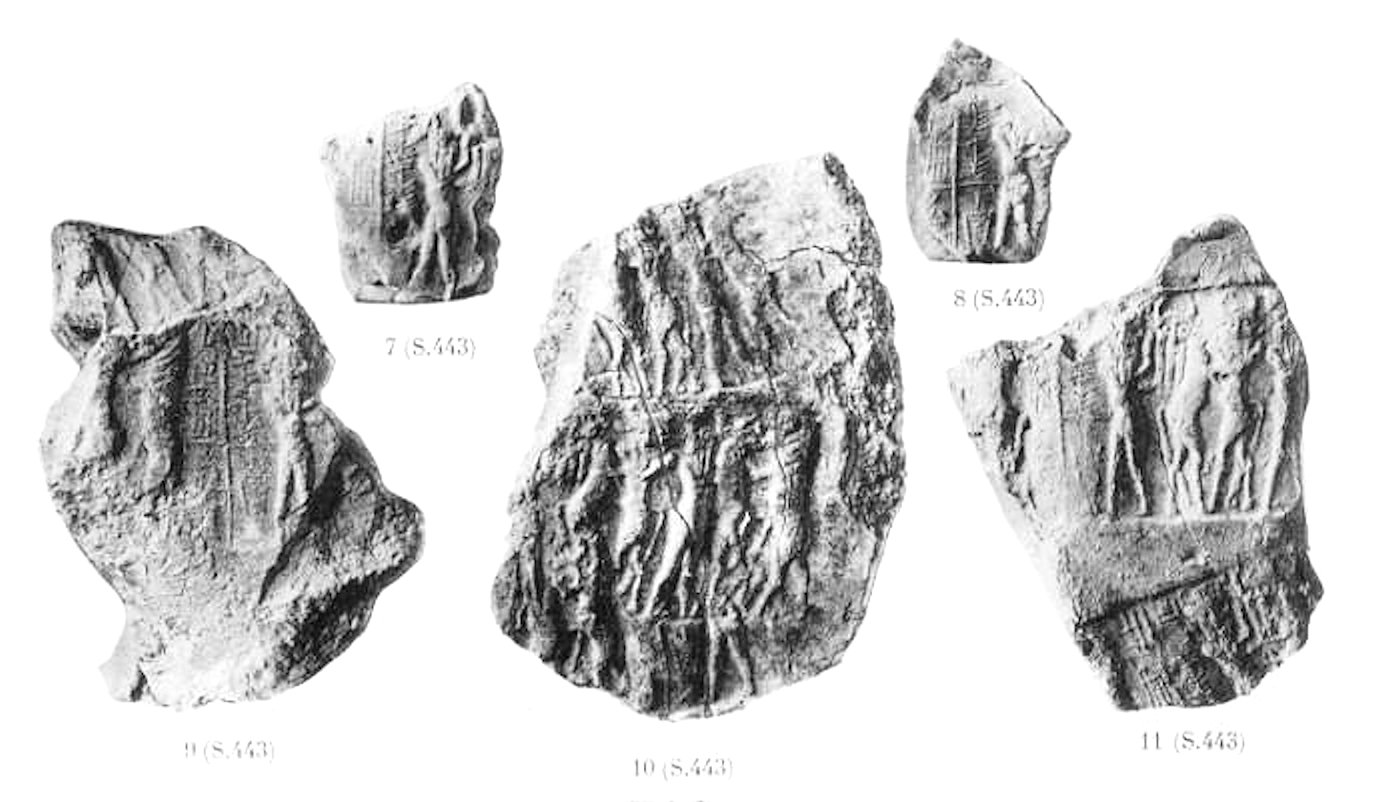
Egigi the fortune teller, servant of Eshpum (fragments).

Preceded by Luh-ishan (Awan Dynasty)	Governor of Elam c. 2269 – c. 2255 BC	Succeeded by Epirmupi
