= Ilshu-rabi =

Ilshu-rabi 𒀭𒋢𒊏𒉈
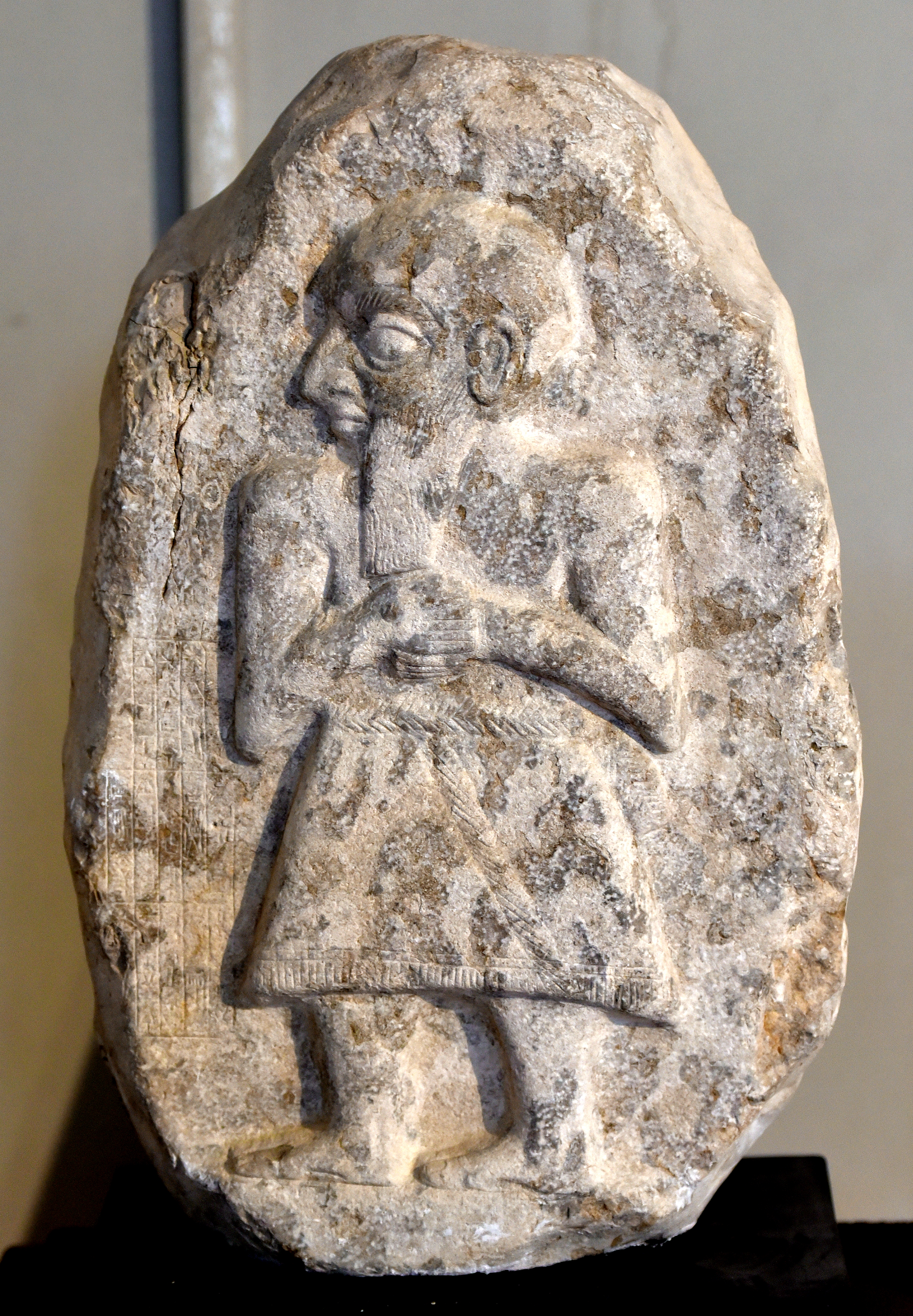
- Stele of Ilšu-rabi from Tell Abu Sheeja, Akkadian, Iraq. Iraq Museum.

Governor of Pashime
- Reign: c. 2269 – c. 2255 BC
- Died: c. 2255 BC

Ilshu-rabi ruled from Susa in Pashime

Ilshu-rabi, also Ilšu-rabi (𒀭𒋢𒊏𒉈 Il-shu-rabi; died c. 2255 BC) was a ruler of Pashime around 2269–2255 BC. He was a vassal of the Akkadian Empire ruler Manishtushu.

While Ilshu-rabi was in charge of Pashime, another Governor of Manistushu named Eshpum was in charge of Elam, in the city of Susa.

== Stele of Ilshu-rabi ==
A relief of Ilshu-rabi is known, which was discovered in Tell Abu Sheeja, ancient Pashime. The inscription on the stele reads:

"For the God Shuda, Ilsu-rabi of Pashime, the soldier, brought in this statue. May the one who erases the name (on this inscription) not find an heir; may he not acquire a name (for himself)

— Inscription on the stele of Ilšu-rabi.

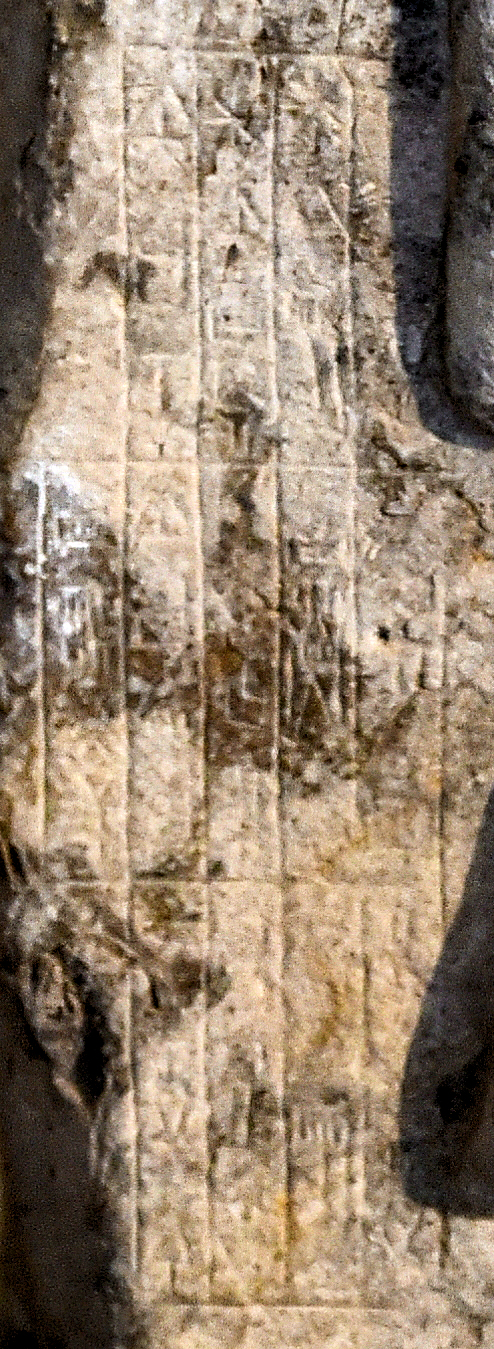
Inscription on the Stele of Ilshu-rabi

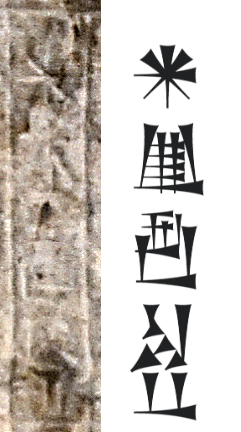
The name "Ilshu-rabi" on his stele.

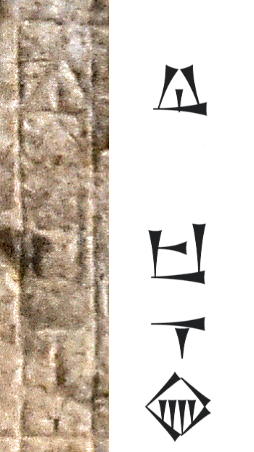
The name of Pashime (𒁀𒋛𒈨𒆠 ba-si-me^{KI}) on the stele of Ilšu-rabi

== Manishtushu Obelisk ==
The name of Ilšu-rabi as Governor of Pashime also appears in the Manishtushu Obelisk inscription, in several mentions of his son Ipulum, who is said to be:

(𒌉) 𒀭𒋢𒊏𒉈 𒑐𒋼𒋛 𒁀𒋛𒈨𒆠
(dumu) il-su-ra-bi2 ensi2 ba-si-me^{{ki}}
"(Son of) Ilshu-rabi, Governor of Pashime"

— Manishtushu Obelisk

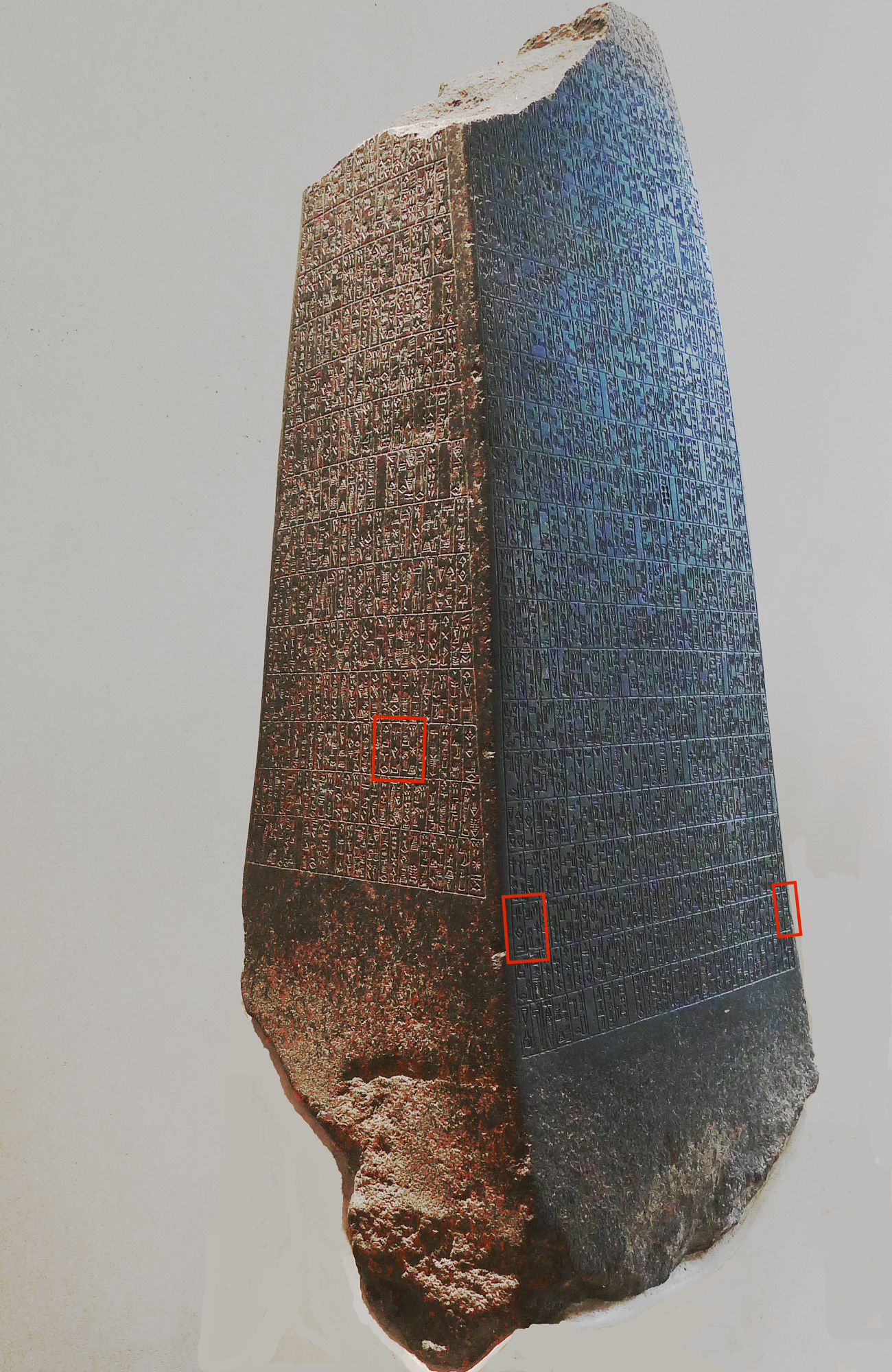
"Ilšu-rabi, Governor of Pashime" appears in the Manishtushu Obelisk

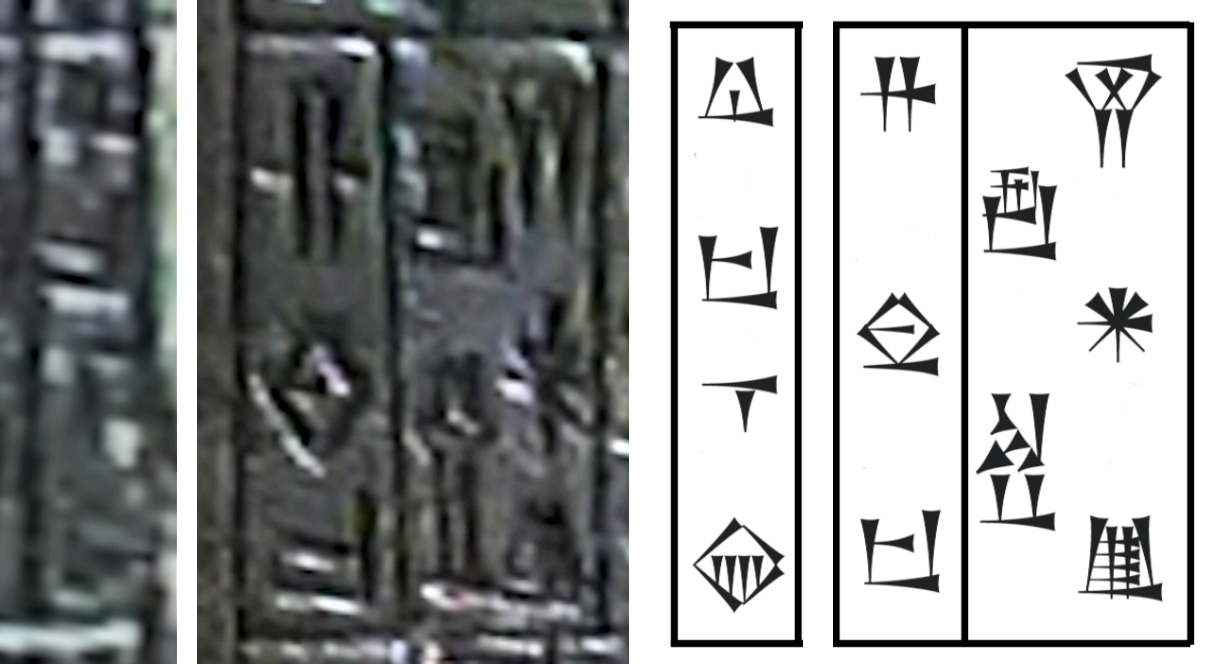
"Son of Ilshu-rabi the Governor / of Pashime" on the Manishtushu Obelisk (Columns 22 and 23, surface c).

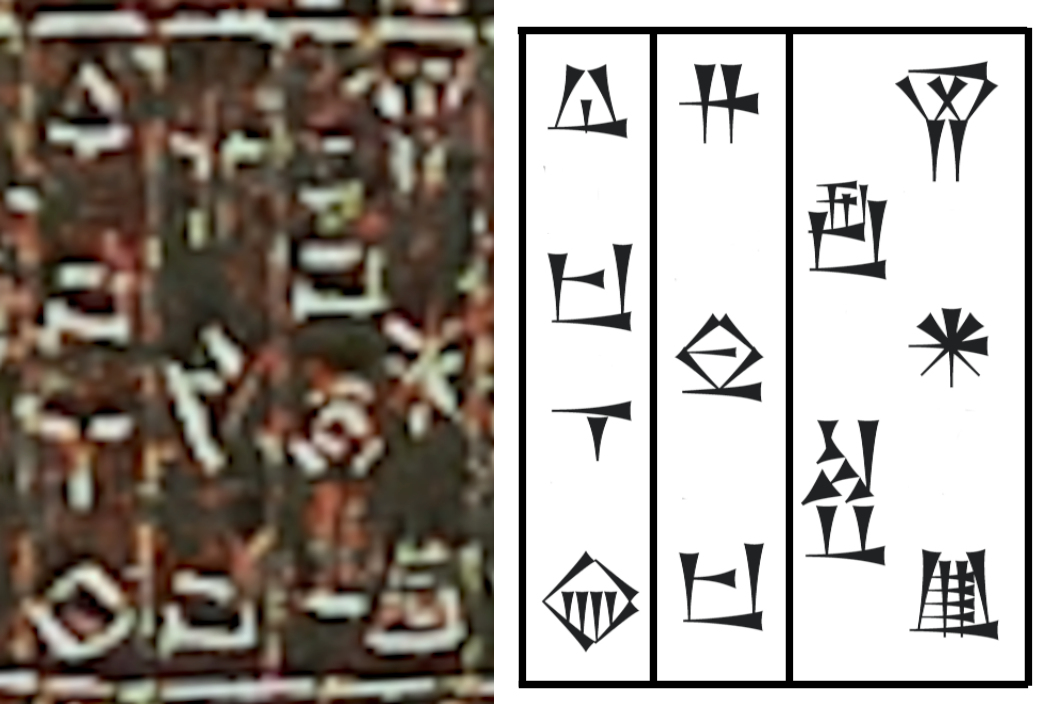
"Son of Ilshu-rabi, Governor of Pashime" on the Manishtushu Obelisk (Column 15, surface d).

Preceded by	Governor of Pashime c. 2269 - c. 2255 BC	Succeeded by
