= Ili-ishmani =

Ili-ishmani 𒉌𒉌𒅖𒈠𒉌
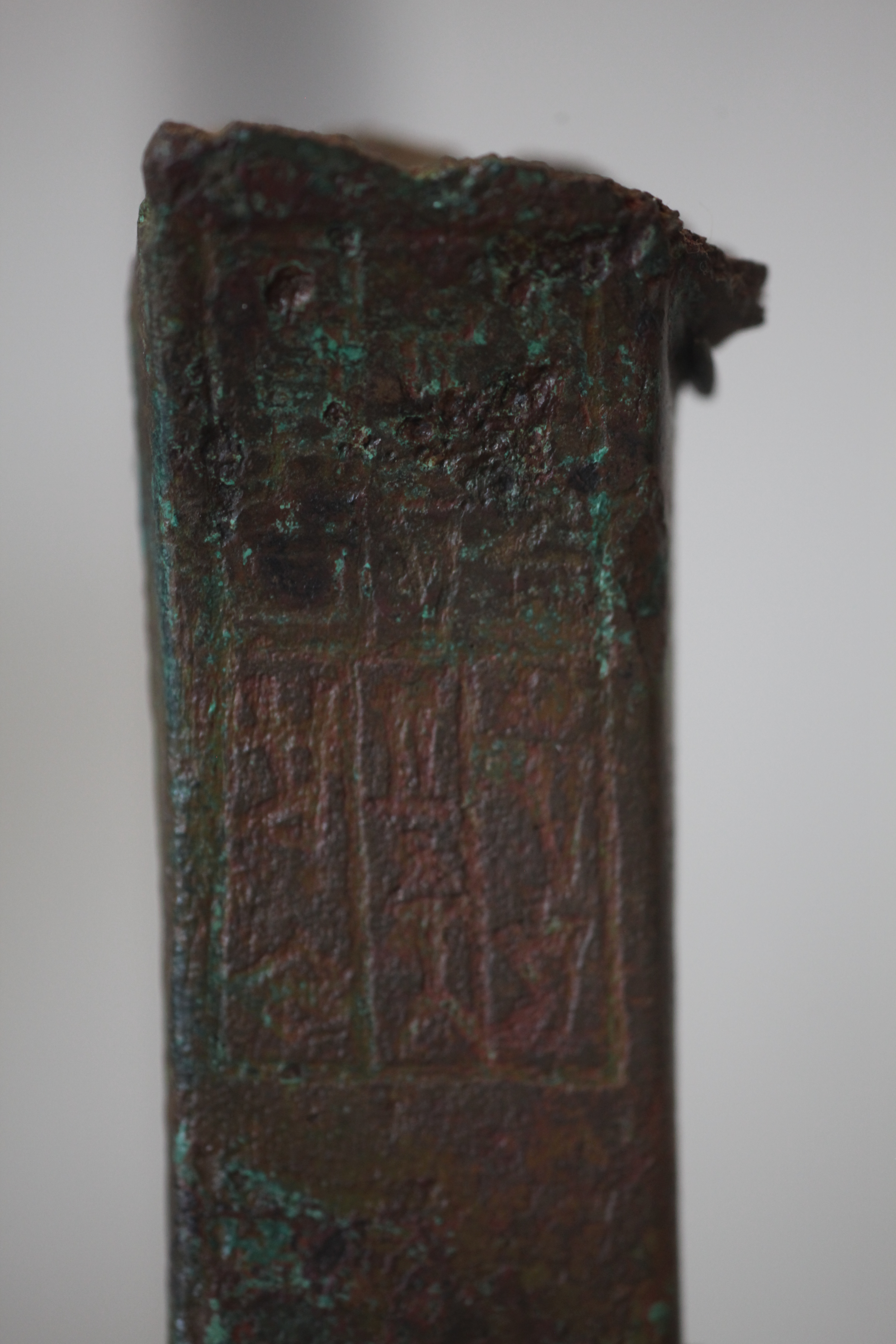
- Axe blade with inscription "Ili-ishmani, scribe and shakkanakku of Elam". Louvre Museum Sb 14243.

King of Elam
- Reign: c. 2150 BC
- Predecessor: Possibly Epirmupi
- Successor: Possibly Hi'elu

Location of Susa

Ili-ishmani (𒉌𒉌𒅖𒈠𒉌 i3-li2-isz-ma-ni; fl. c. 2150 BC) was a ruler of Elam around 2150 BC. His name is purely Akkadian, and he was in charge of Elam at the time of Naram-Sin and/or Shar-Kali-Sharri, and probably their vassal. His title of "Military Governor" (Shakkanakku in Akkadian, GIR.NITA in Sumerian) suggests that he was a dependent of the Akkadian kings, rather than an independent ruler. Ili-ishmani rose from the position of scribe, already one of the top three positions in the land, to the position of Governor.

His predecessor was probably Epirmupi. After him, and the weakening of Akkad, rule in Elam probably reverted to local rulers of the Awan Dynasty.

== Axe fragment ==
The fragment of an axe is known, which was dedicated by Ili-ishmani. It reads:

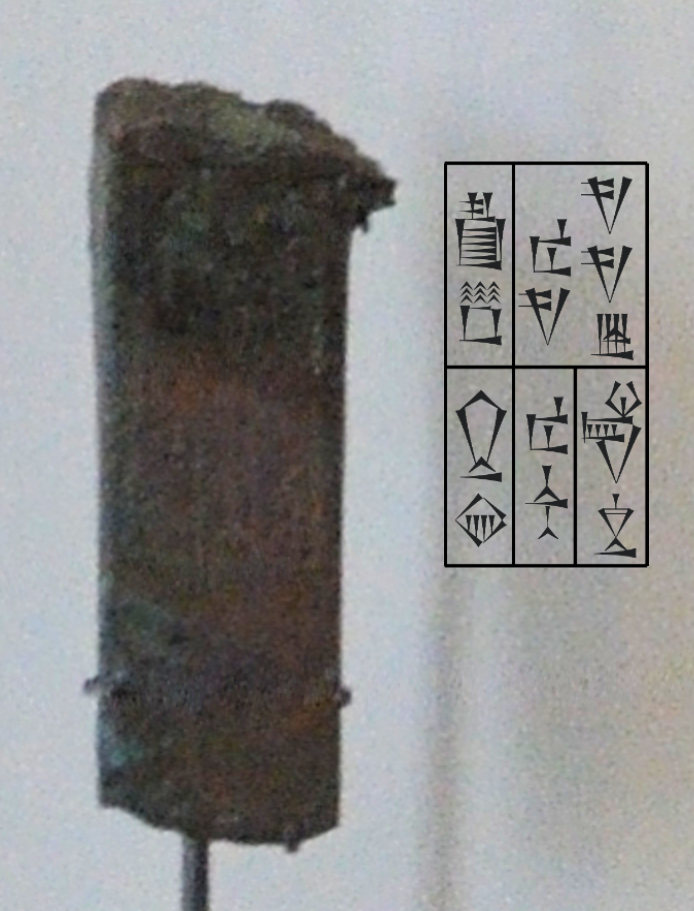
Axe blade with inscription Ilishmani, scribe and shakkanakku of Elam (with transcription)

𒉌𒉌𒅖𒈠𒉌 / 𒁾𒊬 / 𒄊𒀴 / 𒈠𒋾 / 𒉏𒆠

"i3-li2-isz-ma-ni / dub-sar / szagina / ma-ti / elam{ki}
"Ili-išmani, / scribe, / military governor (shakkanakku) / of the land / of Elam."

— Inscription of Ili-ishmani. Louvre Museum Sb 14243.

== Seal inscription ==
A seal found in Lagash also has the inscription "Ili-ishmani Governor (Ensi) of Susa" (𒉌𒉌𒅖𒈠𒉌 𒑐𒋼𒋛 𒈹𒂞𒆠 Ili-ishmani ensi Shushanki).

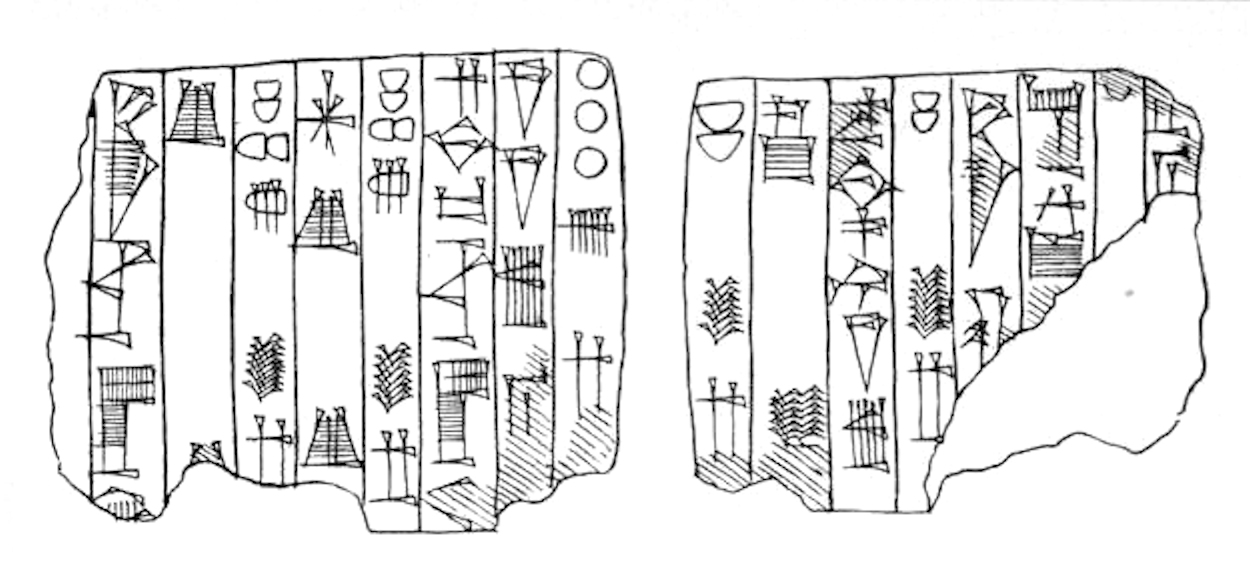
Seal found in Lagash, with the inscription "Ili-ishmani Governor of Susa" (𒉌𒉌𒅖𒈠𒉌 𒑐𒋼𒋛 𒈹𒂞𒆠 Ili-ishmani ensi Shushanki) on the reverse (columns 2 and 3)

Preceded by Possibly Epirmupi	King of Elam c. 2150 BC	Succeeded by Possibly Hi'elu
