= Epirmupi =

Epirmupi 𒂊𒉆𒈬𒉈
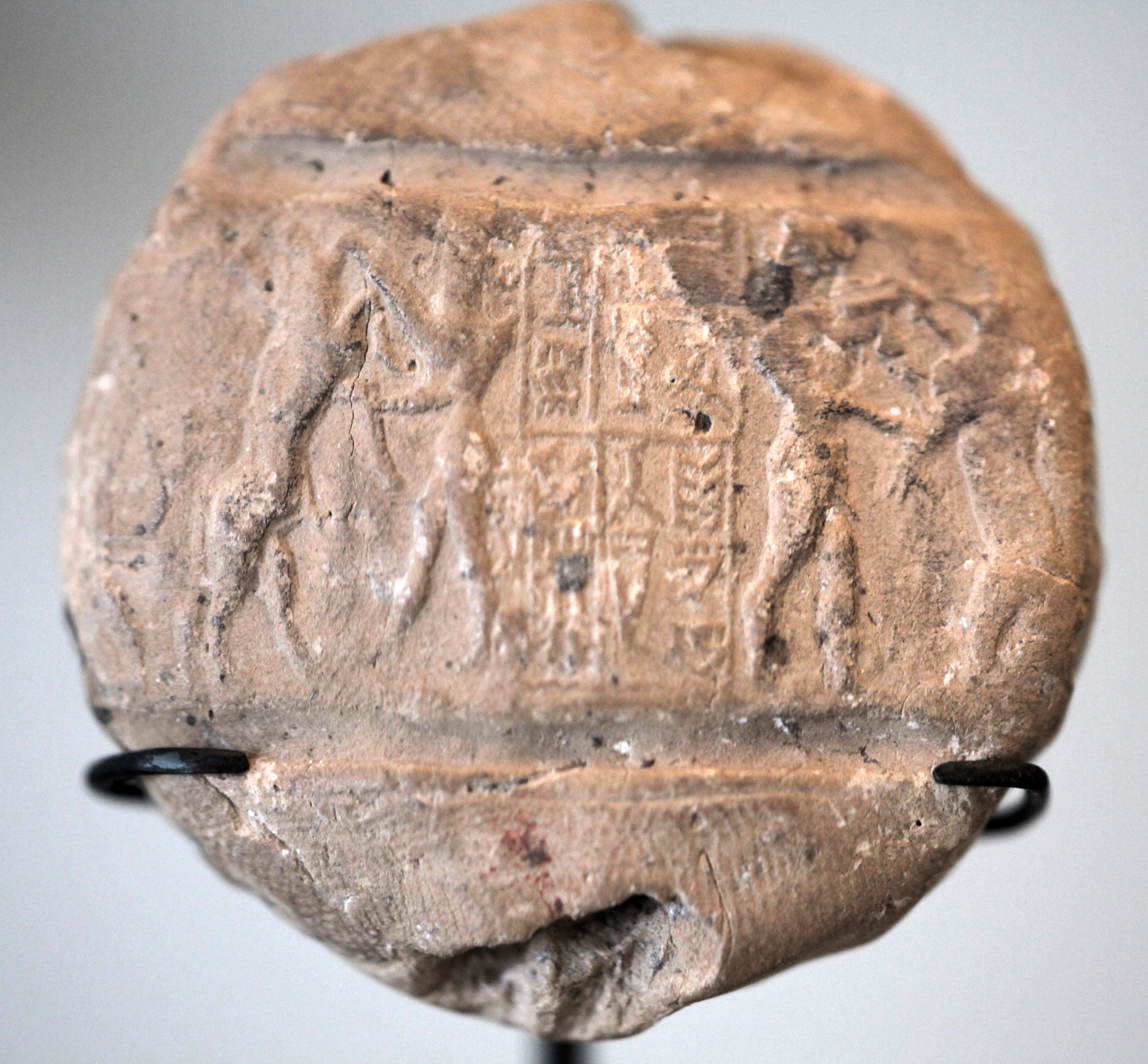
- Seal impression with inscription ""Liburbeli, servant of the Great Epirmupi". Liburbeli in the service of Epirmupi, Governor of Elam and vassal of Rimush and Manishtushu. Louvre Museum Sb 6673.

King of Elam
- Reign: c. 2175 – c. 2154 BC
- Predecessor: Position established
- Successor: Possibly Ili-ishmani

Governor of Elam
- Reign: c. 2199 – c. 2175 BC
- Died: c. 2154 BC

Location of Susa

Epirmupi (𒂊𒉆𒈬𒉈 E-pir-mu-pil, previously read E-nam-mu-de; died c. 2154 BC) was a ruler of Elam around 2199–2154 BC. His name is purely Akkadian, and he was in charge of Elam at the time of Rimush and Manishtushu, or early in the reign of Naram-Sin and probably their dependent and vassal. His title of "Military Governor" (Shakkanakku in Akkadian, GIR.NITA in Sumerian) suggests that he was a dependent of the Akkadian kings, rather than an independent ruler. He also held the title of Ensi of Susa".

His successor was probably Ili-ishmani. After Ili-ishmani, and the weakening of the Akkadian Empire, rule in Elam reverted to local rulers of the Awan Dynasty.

== Seal inscriptions ==
Various inscriptions in the name of Epirmupi are known, especially "Epirmupi, the Shakkanakku of the land of Elam” and "Epirmupi, Ensi of Susa".

A seal is known with the inscription "Epirmupi, the strong, Liburbeli, cup-bearer, your servant", incorporating the image of two heroic combats: a naked hero versus a lion and a naked hero against a buffalo. The seal is now in the Louvre Museum.

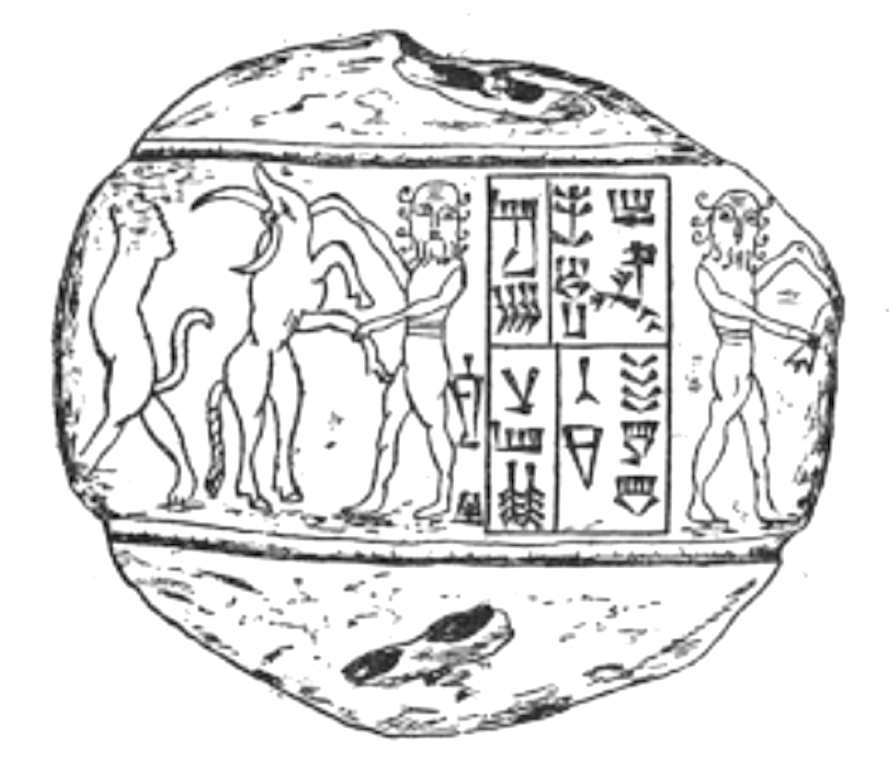
Seal of "Liburbeli, servant of the Great Epirmupi". Louvre Museum Sb 6673.

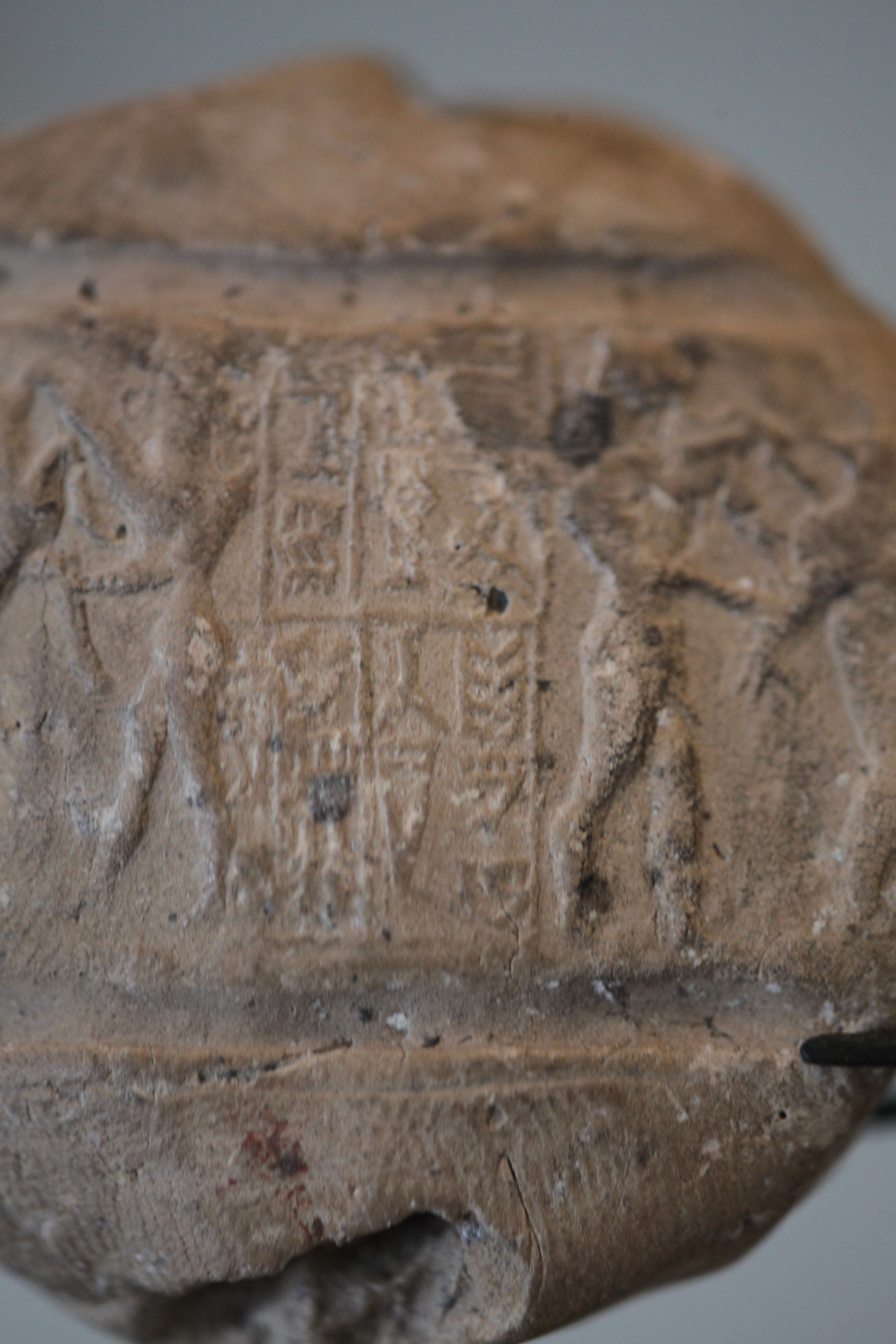
Seal of "Liburbeli, servant of the Great Epirmupi" (detail). Louvre Museum Sb 6673.

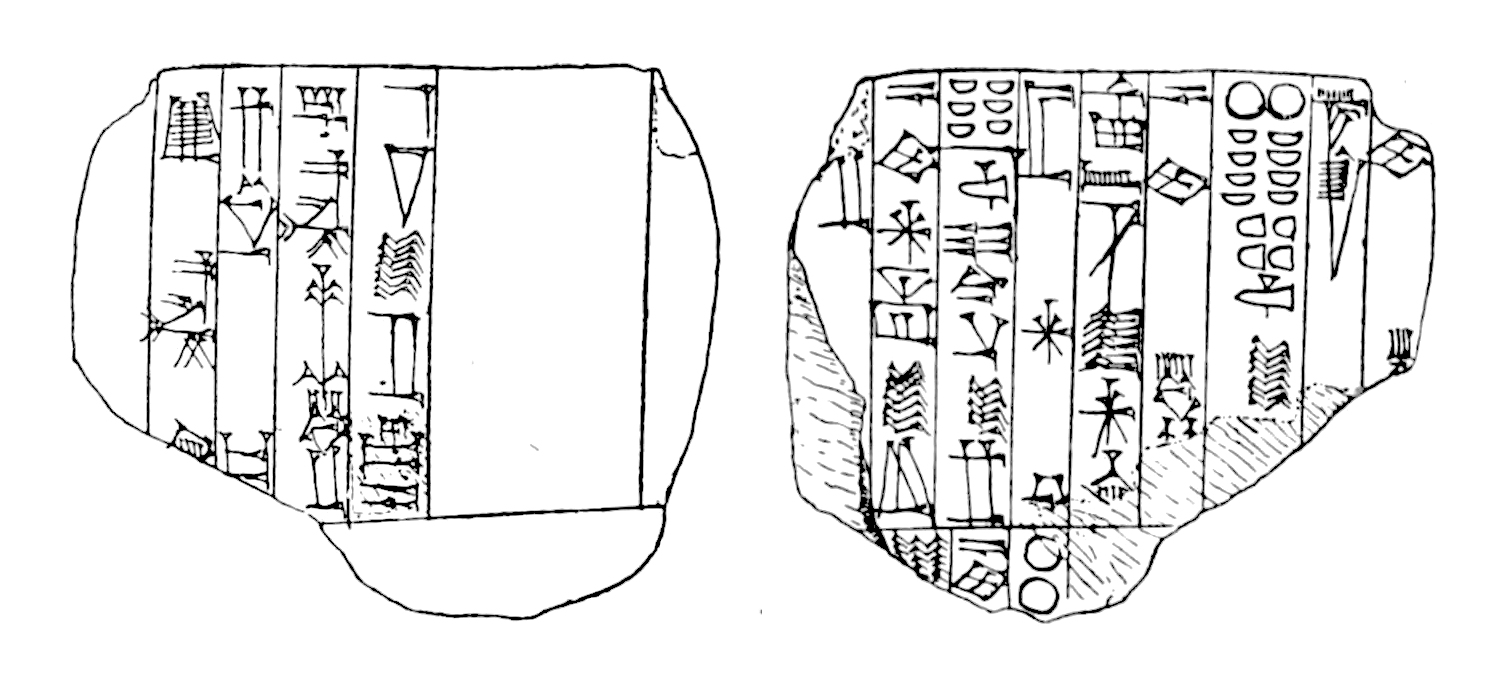
Seal of "Epirmupi Ensi of Susa" (𒂊𒉆𒈬𒉈 𒑐𒋼𒋛 𒋢𒉆𒆠, last three columns)

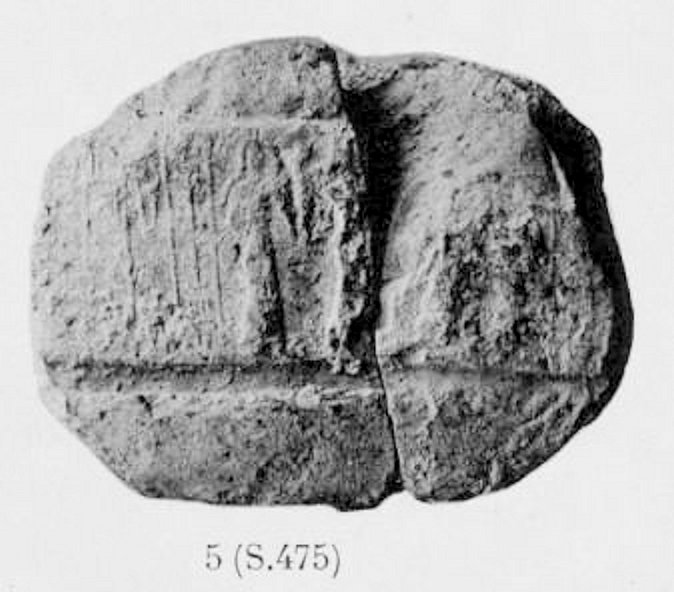
Seal with inscription "Epirmupi Shakkanakku of the Country of Elam" 𒂊𒉆𒈬𒉈 𒄊𒀴 𒉏𒆠.

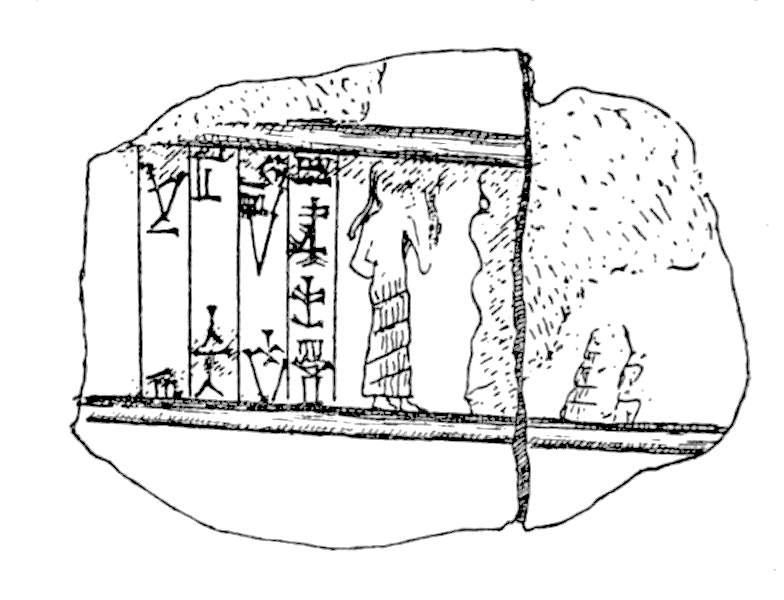
Seal with inscription "Epirmupi Shakkanakku of the Country of Elam" 𒂊𒉆𒈬𒉈 𒄊𒀴 𒉏𒆠

| Preceded by Position established | King of Elam c. 2175 – c. 2154 BC | Succeeded by Possibly Ili-ishmani |
