= Shublugal =

In ancient Mesopotamia, a shublugal, meaning slave of the king(with Lugal meaning king), was a slave who lived in a temple, like gurush and iginidug, but this type was more numerous. In times of peace, the sovereign gave lands to people who exploit, and at times of war, they forced them to take part in the king's campaign.

They were free workers who received lands from the kings in return for their labour. They were at the service of a foreman. The administrator of the temple could take away their livestock or homes with or without compensation.

== Bibliography ==
- Baker, D. L. (14 July 2009). Tight Fists Or Open Hands?: Wealth and Poverty in Old Testament Law. Wm. B. Eerdmans Publishing. p. 79. ISBN 9780802862839.
