= Pashime =

Pashime 𒁀𒋛𒈨𒆠
- Tell Abu Sheeja
- Location within Iraq
- 32°23′45″N 47°8′52″E
- Type: Settlement
- Location: Maysan Governorate, Iraq
- Region: Mesopotamia

History
- Built: 3rd millennium BC

Site notes
- Excavation dates: 2007
- Archaeologists: A. Mohammad, H.A. Hamza

Pašime, (also Bašime and Mišime) (𒁀𒋛𒈨𒆠 ba-si-me^{KI}), was an ancient region of southern Mesopotamia. It has recently been identified with Tell Abu Sheeja, Iraq, about 7 km from Iraq's border with Iran (about 100 kilometers west of Susa). It lies about 70 kilometers southeast of modern Baghdad and 60 kilometers north of the modern city of Amarah. Pashime corresponded to an area of interaction between Mesopotamia and Elam and was occupied from the Ubaid and Uruk periods in the 4th Millennium BC until the Old Babylonian period in the early 2nd Millennium BC. Its tutelary god was Šuda. The city is known from texts to have bordered on the ancient polity of Huhnur (possibly Tappeh Bormi). The city of Pašime is thought to have been on the Persian Gulf which at that time extended much further north.

== History ==
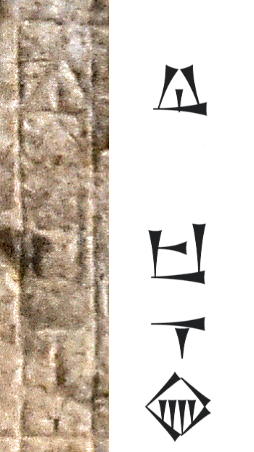
The name of Pašime (𒁀𒋛𒈨𒆠 ba-si-me^{KI}) on the stele of Ilšu-rabi

Pottery finds show the site was occupied beginning in the Ubaid and Uruk period (4th Millennium BC), through the Early Dynastic period, and ending in the Old Babylonian period (early 2nd Millennium BC). Eannatum (c. 2500 BC), ruler of the Early Dynastic period First Dynasty of Lagash, reported sacking Pašime (Mašime) along with destroying the nearby polities of Urua and Arua as well as killing the ruler of Urua. Also in this period, a text lists two slaves being sent to Allulu, the vizier (sukkal) of Pašime. Another text mentions a delivery of beer to Pašime (Mašime), Lagaš, and Ningin. Pašime is known in texts from the Ur III period when it was one of the military garrisons the empire maintained. It was also a way station to Susa, at that time, the Khuzestan region being under the control of Ur. During the reign of Ur III ruler Shu-Sin (c. 2037–2028 BC) it is known that the military governor of Pašime was Arad-Nanna. The Ur III ruler Shulgi (c. 2094–2046 BC), in his 48th year of reign, married his daughter Taram-Šulgi to the ruler of Pašime, Šudda-bani.

The city is known from several sources in the following Isin-Larsa period. The "Išbi Erra royal hymn" of Ishbi-Erra, first ruler of the Dynasty of Isin, mentions Pašime as "Pašime on the seacoast". Larsa ruler Gungunum, in his third year name "Year Bašimi was destroyed" reported attacking Pašime. His fifth year name "Year Anšan was destroyed" reported attacking Anshan indicating this was part of a western campaign by Larsa. Pašime is also known to have been active in period of the First Sealand dynasty.

== Archaeology ==
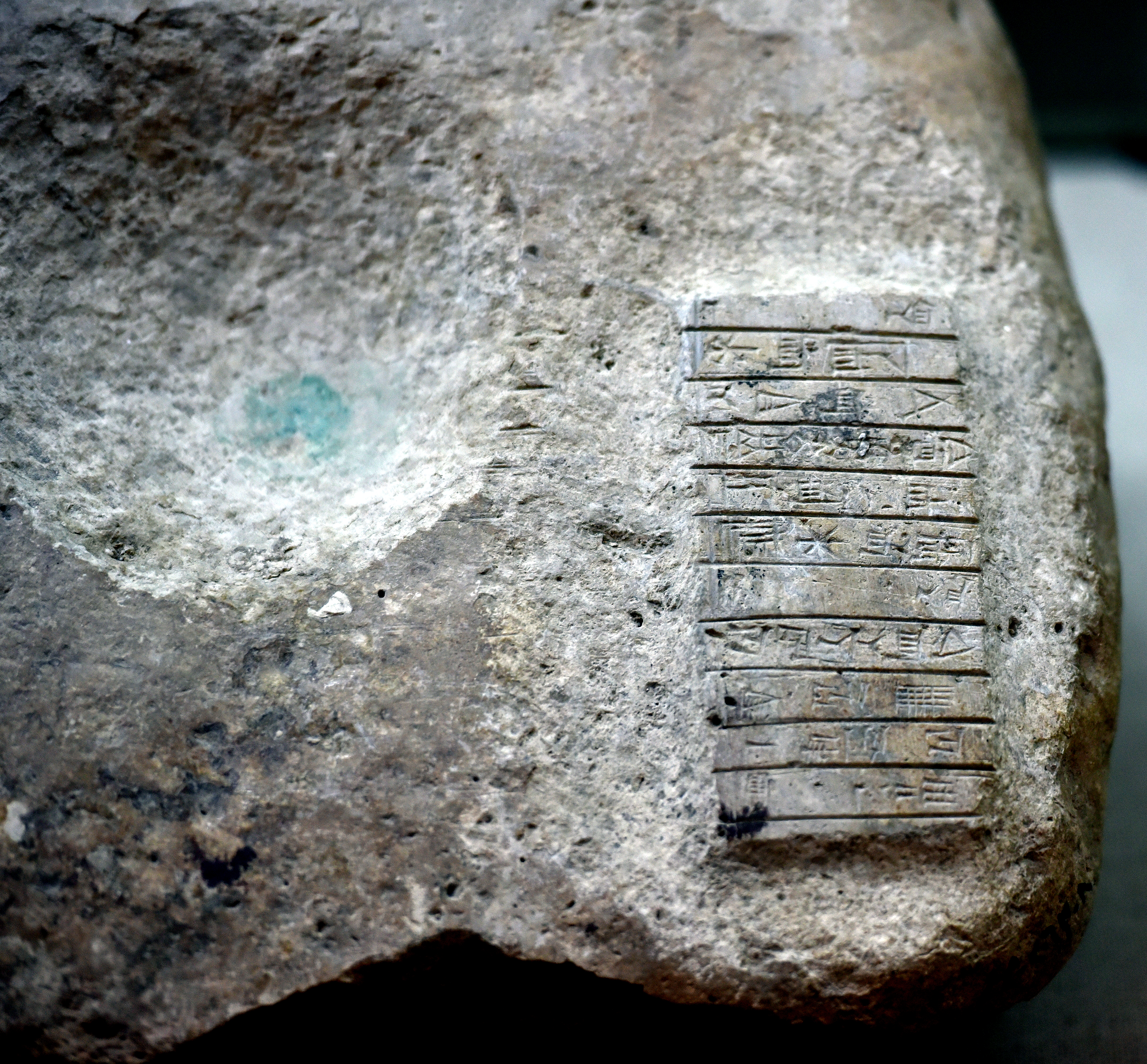
Inscribed door-socket from the Temple of Šuda at Tell Abu Sheeja, Iraq. Ur III period, 21 century BC. Iraq Museum

During the time of its occupation, the site was on the shore of the Persian Gulf, which at that time extended much further north. It covers an area of about 18 hectares and is made up of eight mounds, rising to a maximum of 6 meters above the plain. The site was damaged by military emplacements during the Iran-Iraq war and some Islamic period graves are to be found at the surface level.

The site was excavated in 2007 by a team from the Iraqi State Board of Antiquities and Heritage led by A. Mohammad and H.A. Hamza. Excavation occurred in 3 areas (A on the northeastern edge of the tell, B in the middle section of the site, and C in the south), with Area A being the main focus. In area B, a stepped trench was excavated, revealing four occupation levels ranging from the Early Dynastic period to the Old Babylonian period, with pottery shards from the earlier Ubaid and Uruk periods. A number of terracotta figurines of animals, nude females, and "molded bed fragments show couples in a sexual attitude" were found. Area C was a 10-meter by 10-meter square with one occupation level in two phases and included an arched-roofed tomb.

Two occupation levels (Level 2 and an earlier Level 1) were determined in Area A, the latter marked by a large mudbrick platform and the former by multiple phases. In area A, in the earlier level, a temple to the god Šuda was found, which had inwardly sloping walls and a curving one-meter-thick enclosure wall. An inscribed door socket, in Old Akkadian and dated to the Ur III period, was found at the lowest phase of Level 1 and recorded the construction of the door to the Šuda temple.

"For Šuda, their lord, the three children of Tābu(m)-...(?), for their (long) life, the main door of the temple of Šuda, they set up(?). One iku, the gift, the temple administrator(?), 1 three-year-old bull(?)."

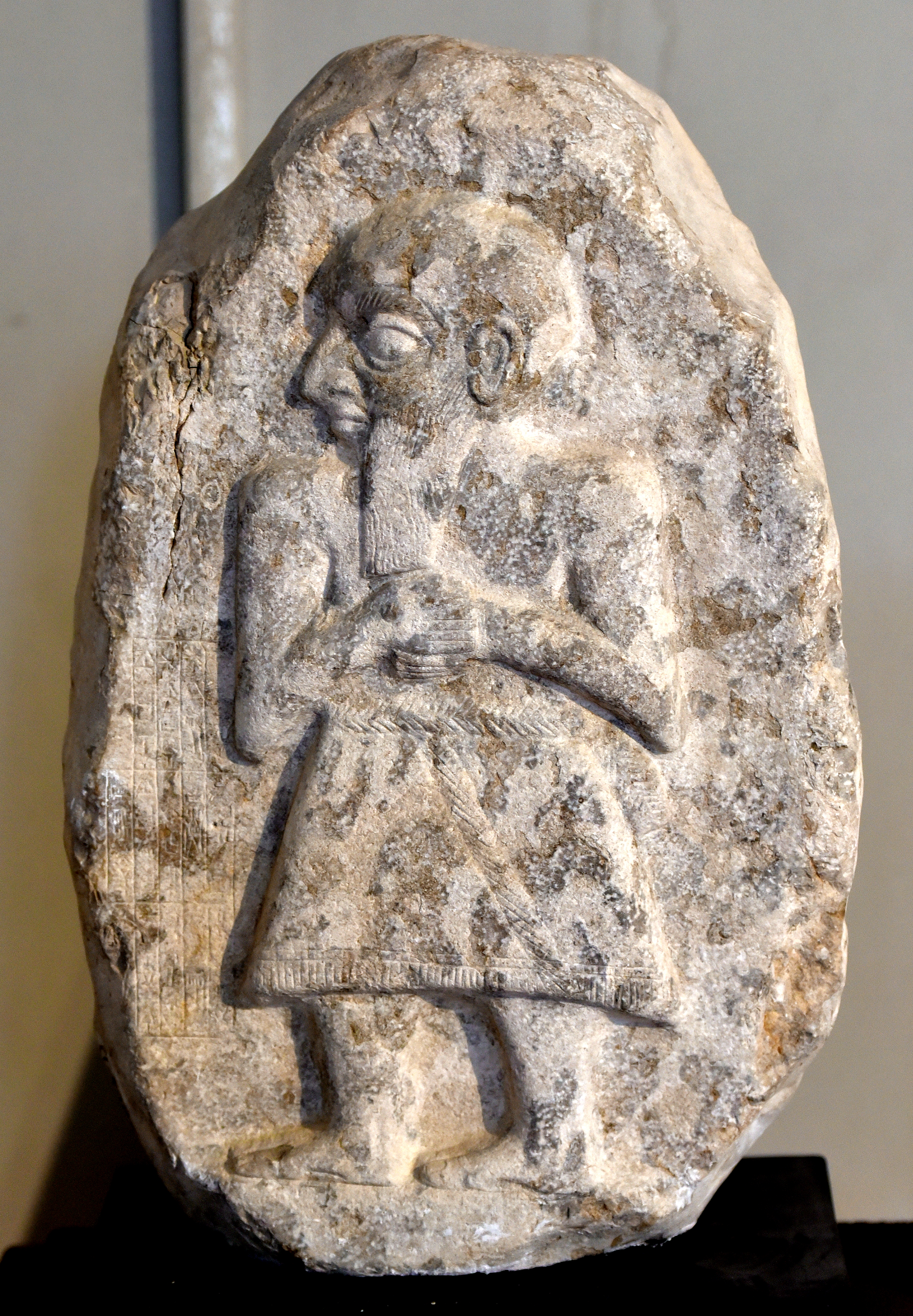
Stele of Ilšu-rabi from Tell Abu Sheeja, Akkadian, Iraq. Iraq Museum

A gray and white alabaster stele was discovered in Area A of Tell Abu Sheeja, inscribed in Old Akkadian, with the name of a Ilšu-rabi, who has the same name as Ilšu-rabi the Governor of Pašime in the Manishtushu Obelisk inscription and is thought to possibly be a son of Manishtushu, the third ruler of the Akkadian Empire. The stele was found embedded in a wall where it had been mounted and then plastered over in a later period, having lost relevance. The inscription on the stele reads:

"For the God Šuda, Ilsu-rabi of Pašime, the soldier, brought in this statue. May the one who erases the name (on this inscription) not find an heir; may he not acquire a name (for himself)."

== See also ==
- Cities of the ancient Near East
- List of Mesopotamian dynasties
- Tell Abu al-Dhahab
