= Manishtushu =

Third king of the Akkadian Empire

Manishtushu 𒈠𒀭𒅖𒌅𒋢
- King of Sumer
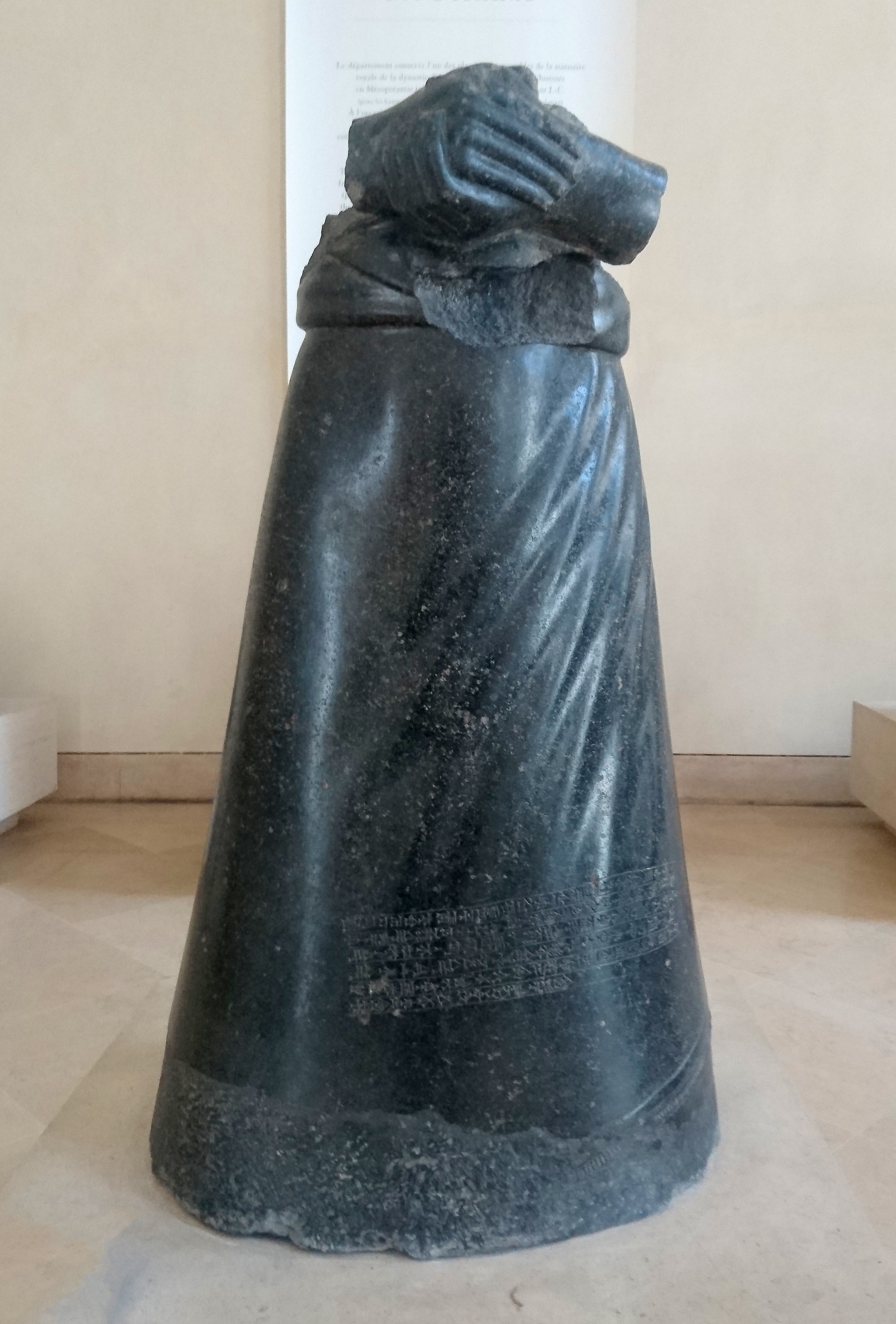
- Statue of Manishtusu. Elamite language inscription stating that the statue was taken from Akkad and brought to Susa in the 12th century BC by king Shutruk-Nakhunte. Held at the Louvre Museum as fragments SB 47 + SB 9099.

King of Akkad
- Reign: c. 2270 – c. 2255 BC
- Predecessor: Rimush
- Successor: Naram-Sin
- Died: c. 2255 BC
- Issue: Naram-Sin; Meshalim
- Father: Sargon
- Mother: Tashlultum

Manishtushu (Man-ištušu) (𒈠𒀭𒅖𒌅𒋢, Ma-an-ish-tu-su; Died c. 2255 BC) was the third king of the Akkadian Empire, reigning 15 years c. 2270 BC until his death c. 2255 BC. His name means "Who is with him?". He was the son of Sargon the Great, the founder of the Akkadian Empire, and he was succeeded by his son, Naram-Sin who also deified him posthumously. A cylinder seal, of unknown provenance, clearly from the reign of Naram-Sin or later, refers to the deified Manishtushu i.e. "(For) the divine Man-istusu: Taribu, the wife of Lugal-ezen, had (this seal) fashioned". Texts from the later Ur III period show offerings to the deified Manishtushu (spelled ᵈMa-iš-ti₂-su or ᵈMa-an-iš-ti₂-su). The same texts mention a town of ᵈMa-an-iš-ti₂-su where there was a temple of Manishtushu. This temple was known in the Sargonic period as Ma-an-iš-t[i-s]u^{ki}.

== Biography ==
Manishtushu was the third king of the Akkadian Empire according to Old Babylonian tradition though listed as the 2nd, after Sargon, in the Ur III recension of the Sumerian King List. He was the son of Sargon of Akkad, brother of Enheduanna, Rimush, and Shu-Enlil, and the father of Naram-Sin. Only one year name is known. An unprovenanced tablet at the Iraq Museum from the Umma region on epigraphic grounds reads "In the year that Dūr-Maništusu was established". From this it is also known that a "fortress of Manishtusu" was built though the location is unknown.

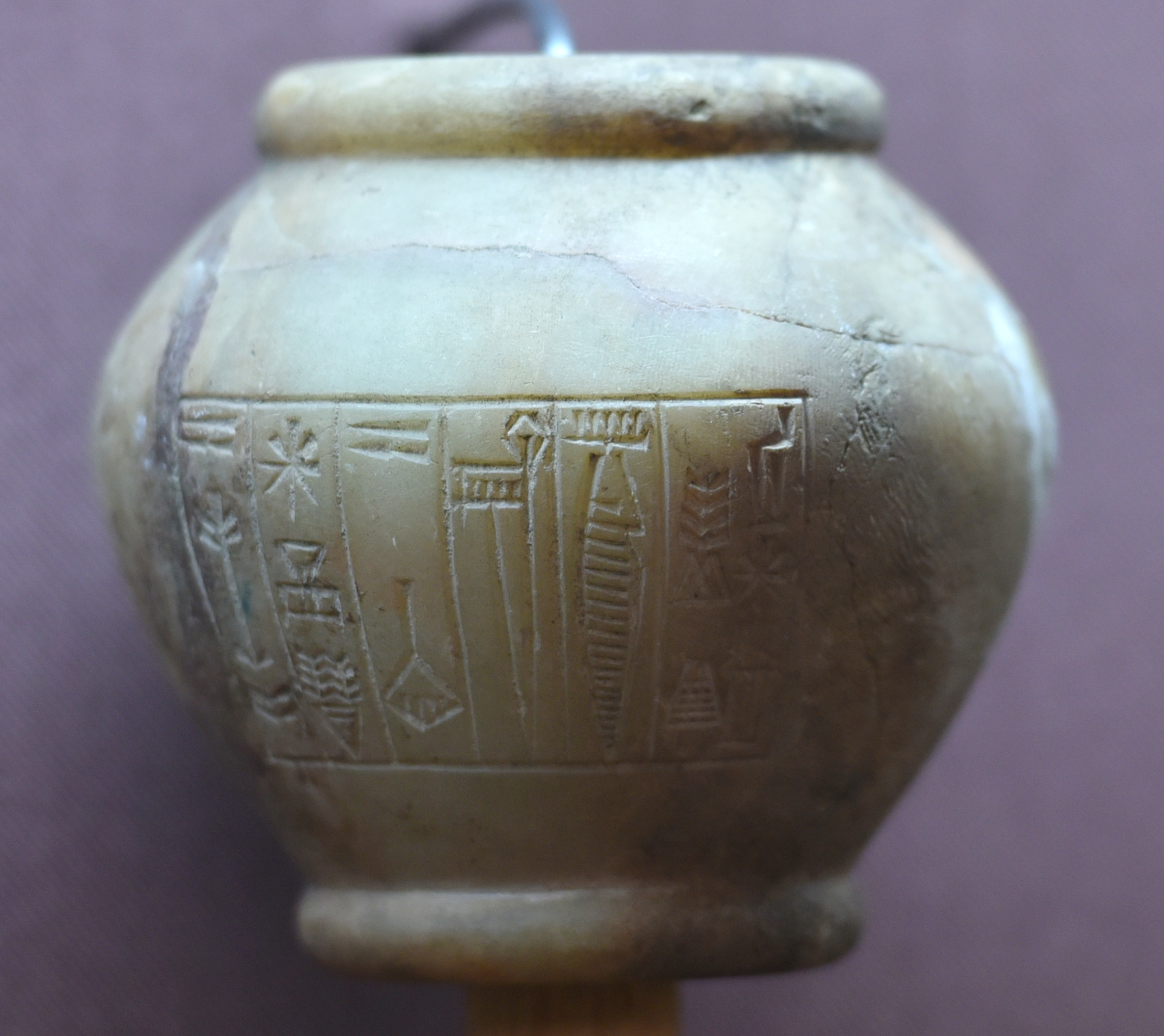
Votive stone mace-head from Uruk, Iraq., the name of Manishtushu appears, c. 2270-2255 BC. Iraq Museum.

He became king c. 2270 BC after the death of his brother Rimush. Manishtushu, freed of the rebellions of his brother's reign, led campaigns to distant lands. According to a passage from one of his inscriptions, he led a fleet down the Persian Gulf where 32 kings allied to fight him. Manishtushu was victorious and consequently looted their cities and silver mines, along with other expeditions to kingdoms along the Persian Gulf. He also sailed a fleet up the Tigris River that eventually traded with 37 other nations, conquered the city of Anshan in Elam, and rebuilt the destroyed temple of Inanna in Nineveh c. 2260 BC. In Elam and Pashime, in the coastal area of Iran, Manishtushu had governors installed for the Akkadian Empire: Eshpum was in charge of Elam, while Ilshu-rabi was in charge of Pashime.

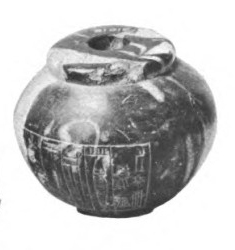
BM 91018 Macehead in the name of Manishtushu

An ellipsoidal axehead (copper or bronze) from the region of Elam (provenance is uncertain as it is in a private collection) reads "(For) Maništušu, king of Kiš, Māšum, the charioteer, his servant". This form of axehead is known from other examples and from Akkadian Empire iconography. A marble mace head found at Sippar (BM 91018) reads "Man-istusu, king of the world, dedicated (this mace) to the goddess Belat-Aia". An alabaster mace head found at Isin (IB 1878 - Iraqi Museum number unknown), in the shrine of Ninurta of the Gula temple, reads "Man-istusu, king of the world, dedicated (this mace) to the goddess Ninisina.". Some inscriptions of the underlings of Manishtushu are known. A votive statue found at Susa reads "Man-istusu, king of the world: Espum, his servant, dedicated (this statue) to the goddess Narunte." and a copper spear point found at Assur (VA 8300) read "Man-istusu, king of the world: Azuzu, his servant, dedicated (this spear) to the god Be'al-SI.SL".

𒈠𒀭𒅖𒌅𒋢 / 𒈗 / 𒆧 / 𒀹𒅗 / 𒀵𒋢 / 𒀀𒈾 / 𒀭𒈾𒊒𒋾 / 𒀀𒈬𒈾𒊒
"ma-an-iš-tu-su / lugal / kiš / eš_{18}-pum / ARAD_{2}-su / a-na / ^{{d}}na-ru-ti / a mu-na-ru
For Manishtushu king of Kish, Eshpum his servant, dedicated this statue to Narundi"

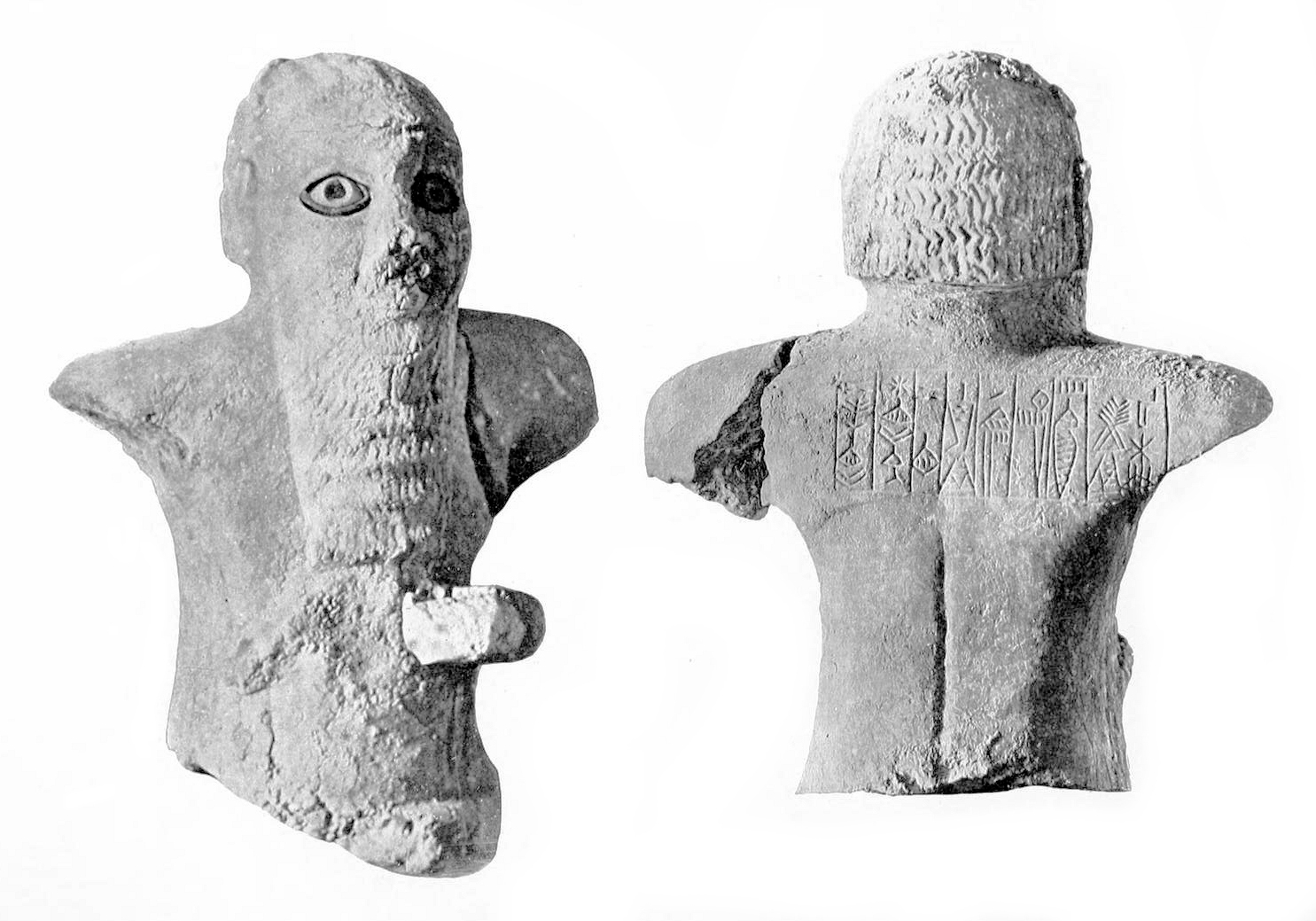
Archaic votive statue with Eshpum's inscription in the back

Around 2255 BC, Manishtushu died, possibly assassinated by members of his own court, and was succeeded by his son Naram-Sin. This supposed manner of his death is based on an Old Babylonian period extispicy omen text which reads "if the heart is like the testicle(s) of a sheep, it is an omen of Manishtushu, whom his palace killed". He held the title "King of Kish" in some of his inscriptions.

The Manishtushu "standard inscription" is known from at least eight exemplars, statue fragments found at Nippur (CBS 19925), Sippar (BM 56630 and BM 56631), Susa (SB 51 and SB 15566), and Khafajah (KH II 162) as well as Old Babylonian tablet copies of Manishtushu inscriptions found at Nippur (CBS 13972 and NI 3200) and Ur (U 7725):

"Man-istusu, king of the world: when he conquered Ansan and Sirihum, had ... ships cross the Lower Sea. The cities across the Sea, thirty-two (in number), assembled for battle, but he was victorious (over them). Further, he conquered their cities, [st]ru[c]k down their rulers and aft[er] he [roused them (his troops)], plundered as far as the Silver Mines. He quarried the black stone of the mountains across the Lower Sea, loaded (it) on ships, and moored (the ships) at the quay of Agade. He fashioned a statue of himself (and) dedicated (it) to the god [Enlil]. By the gods Samas and Ilaba I swear that (these) are not falsehoods (but) are indeed true. As for the one who removes this inscription, may the gods Enlil and Samas tear out foundations and destroy his progeny. - Man-istusu, king of the world, dedicated (this object) to the god Enlil."

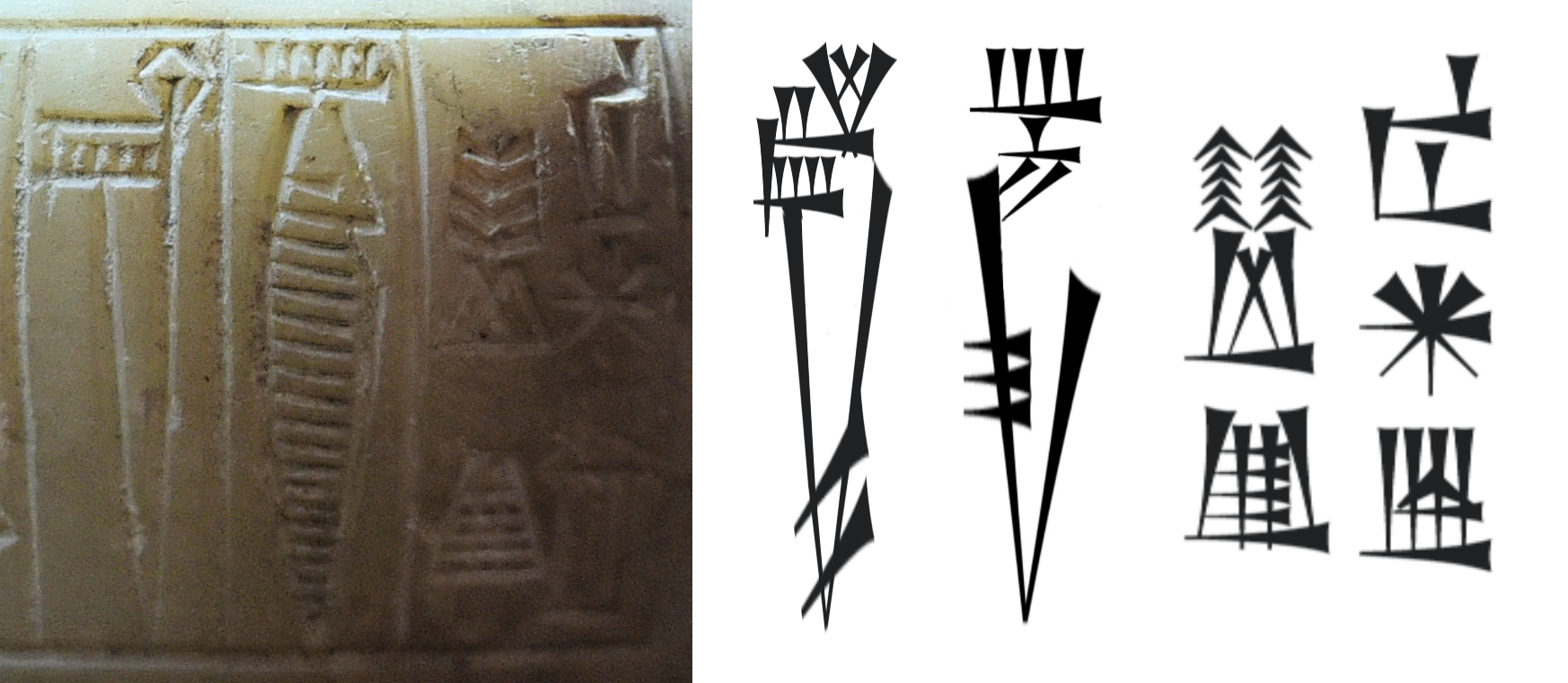
Manishtushu Lugal Kish

An inscribed door socket was found at an unexcavated mound on the Adaim river near where it meets the Tigris river, Khara'ib Ghdairife. It read "Manistusu, king of Kis, builder of the temple of the goddess Ninhursaga in HA.A KI. Whoever removes this tablet, may Ninhursaga and Samas uproot his seed and destroy his progeny."

=== Cruciform Monument of Manishtushu ===
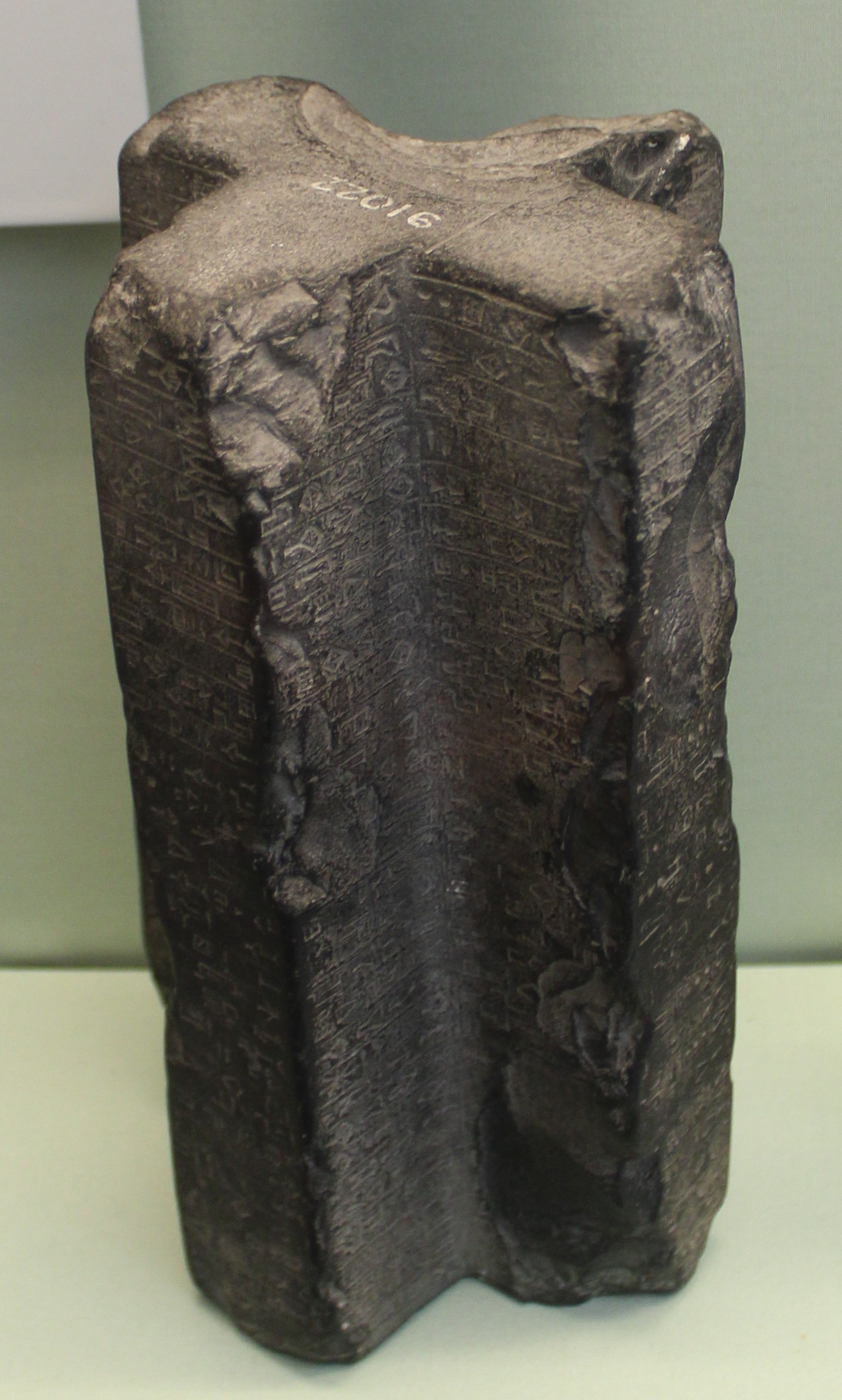
Cruciform Monument of Manishtushu

In the early days of ancient Near Eastern archaeology a cross shaped (from above) monument of Manishtushu (BM 91022), inscribed in twelve columns, was discovered in 1881 by Hormuzd Rassam at Sippar. The monument mainly deals with the refurbishment of the Ebabbar temple in Sippar. It was assumed to be a legitimate Old Babylonian period copy of an Old Akkadian period monument. Later research showed that it was actually an Old Babylonian forgery. More recently, scholarship has dated the forging of the cruciform monument even later, to the Neo-Babylonian period. Several Late Babylonian copies of the cruciform monument have also been found.

"I am Maništušu, son of Sargon, strong king, king of Kish, anointed of Anum, vicar of Enlil, viceroy of Aba, molder of countless bricks, shrine builder to Aya, the bride, my mistress I built a twelve-bur cloister (and) a horse for Šamaš and Aya, the bride, my mistress ... "

=== Manishtushu Obelisk ===
The diorite obelisk, damaged at the top and bottom, was found at the site of Susa in Elam in 1897 by Jacques de Morgan. The origin of the monument, considered a kudurru i.e. a land grant, is unknown though generally thought to be from Sippar based on locations mentioned in it and the fact that most texts carried back to Susa by the Elamites came from the Ebabbar temple of the god Shamash in Sippar. It is currently held in the Louvre Museum (SB 20). It records the purchase by Manishtushu of eight parcels of land totaling 3430 hectares. The kudurru is 144 centimeters in height (including a small plaster base added to the bottom to stabilize it). It has four inscribed sides (A-50 centimeters wide, B-45 centimeters wide, C-52 centimeters wide, and D-39 centimeters wide) which include a total of 76 columns of text with some lines at the top lost. The text is written in Akkadian language but with Sumerian orthography. This is the first written use of the talent measurement "3 talents 33 minas silver (as) the price of a field". A sample passage:

"Field of E-kum and Zimanak; the field's border to the north is the field of An-za-ma-tim; the field's border to the west is the Abgal canal; the field's border to the south is the field of M.; the field's border to the east is the field of Mi-zu-a-NI-im."

The Cuneiform Digital Library Initiative artifact number is P213189.

A number of locations and personal names are mentioned on the long text of the obelisk. The fields being procured are noted as being around four cities, Dur-Sin, Girtab, Marda, and Kish, with only the location of Dur-Sin unknown in modern times. All lie in the general area of Babylon, Nippur, and Kish near the ancient course of the Euphrates river. One of the personal names mentioned on the obelisk is "(Son of) Ilshu-rabi, Governor of Pashime". It has been suggested that this refers to Ilshu-rabi, a vassal of Manishtushu and governor of Pashime. This is based on the discovery of a stele at Tell Abu Sheeja reading "For the God Shuda, Ilsu-rabi of Pashime, the soldier, brought in this statue. May the one who erases the name (on this inscription) not find an heir; may he not acquire a name (for himself)".

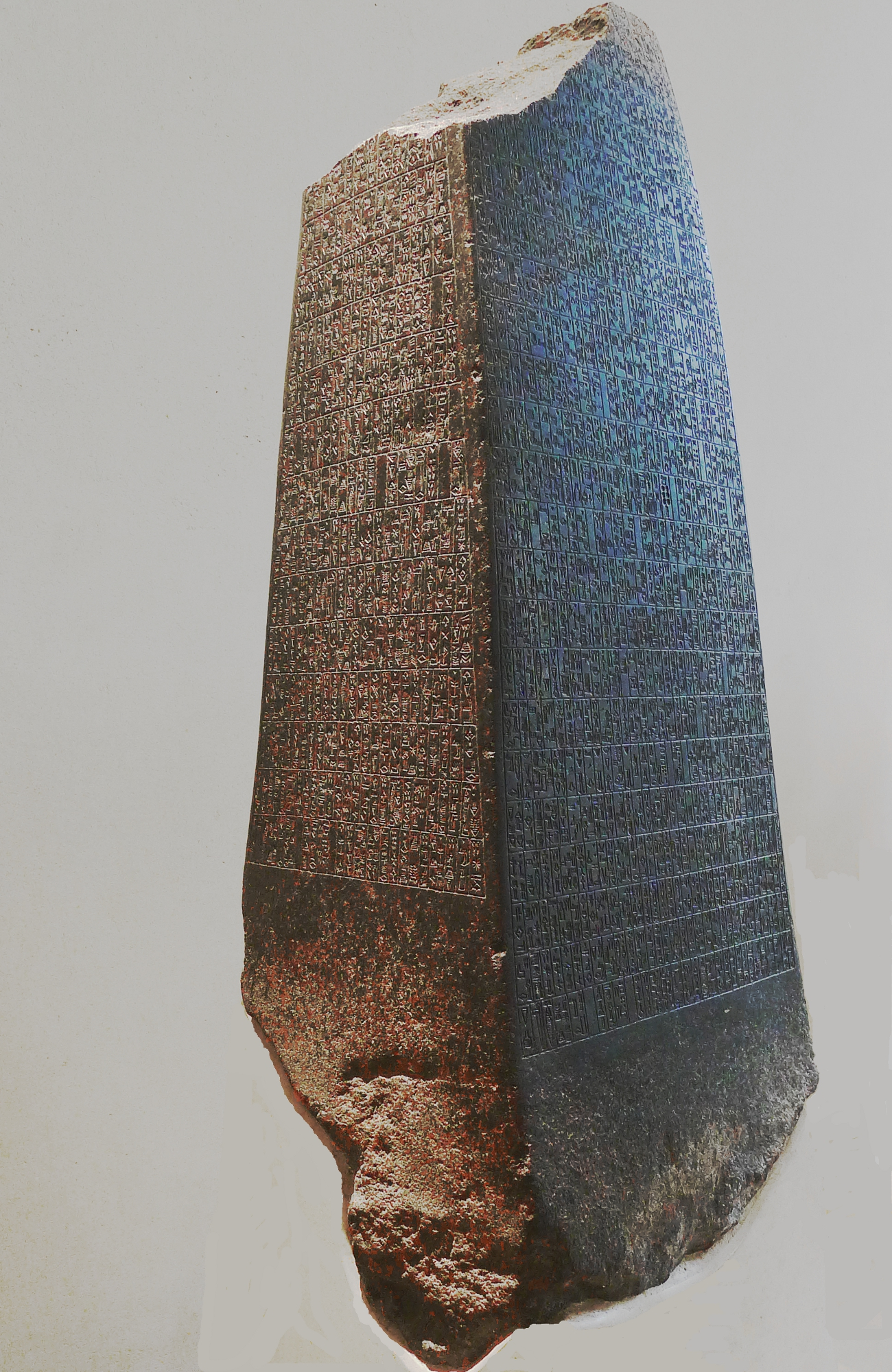
Manishtushu Obelisk, Louvre Museum

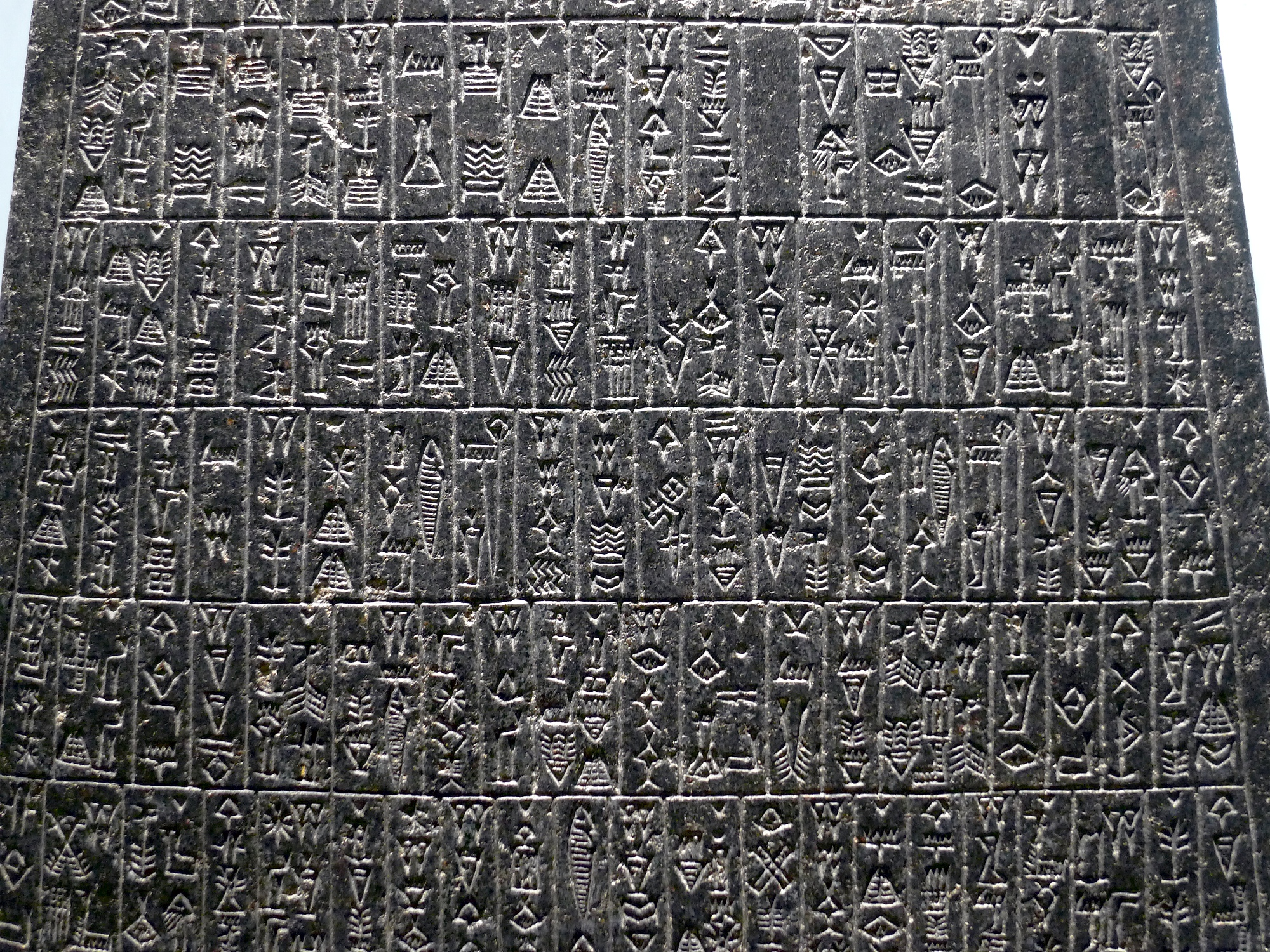
Detail of inscription on the obelisk

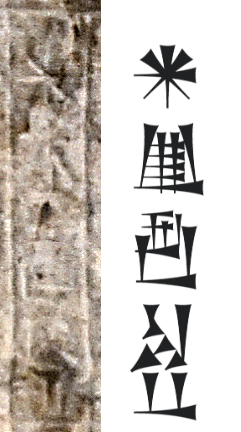
The name "Ilshu-rabi" on the stele

=== Miscellaneous fragments ===
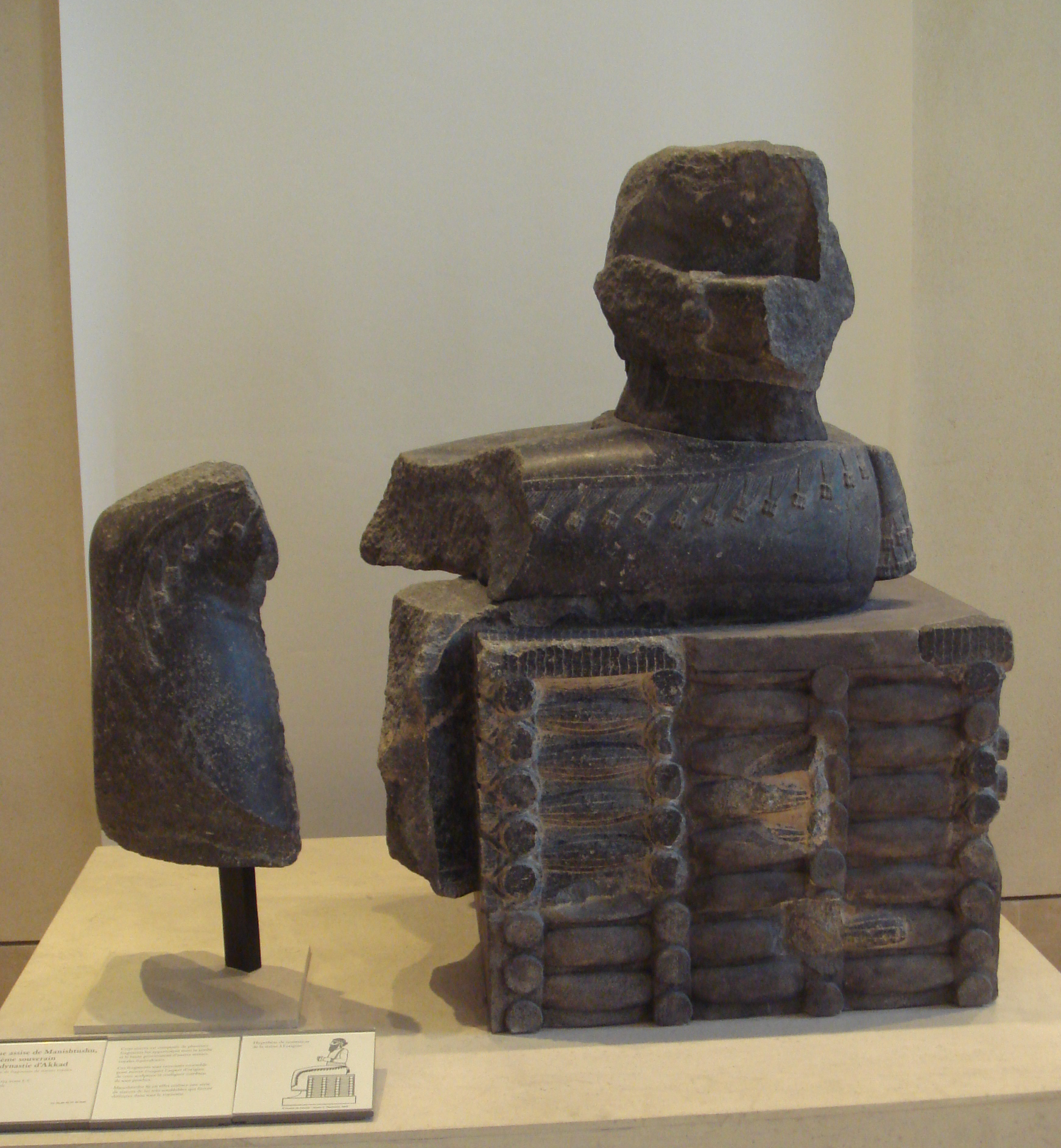
Throne of Manishtushu Louvre Museum

Various bits and pieces of the statues and monuments of Manishtushu have been found. They are identified by contemporary inscriptions, by added later inscriptions (mostly in the Elamite language where the name was rendered Ma-an-iš-du-uz-z) and, somewhat more controversially, on stylistic and iconographic bases. An example is the combination of fragment SB 49 (stool) and SB 50 (legs), held at the Louvre Museum, sometimes referred to as the "throne of Manishtushu". It was found at Susa and carried an Elamite language inscription by ruler Shutruk-Nahhunte (c. 1184 to 1155 BC) who carried it away from Eshnunna after a raid.

Another exemplar, found at Susa and inscribed a millennium later by Shutruk-Nakhunte is the statue composed of fragments SB 47 (body) + SB 9099 (hands) said by Shutruk-Nakhunte to be of Manishtushu.

"I am Shutruk-Nahhunte, son of Hallutush-Inshushinak, beloved servant of the god Inshushinak, king of Anshan and Susa, who has enlarged the kingdom, who takes care of the lands of Elam, the lord of the land of Elam. When the god Inshushinak gave me the order, I defeated Akkad. I took the stele of Manishtushu and carried it off, bringing it to the land of Elam."

== See also ==
- History of Sumer
- List of kings of Akkad
- List of Mesopotamian dynasties

Regnal titles
Preceded by Rimush	King of Akkad; King of Kish, Uruk, Lagash, and Umma; Overlord of Elam c. 2270 - c. 2255 BC	Succeeded by Naram-Sin
