= Hallock (surname) =

Hallock is a surname. Notable people with the surname include:

- Ben Hallock (born 1997), American water polo player
- Charles Hallock (1834–1917), American writer and publisher
- Donald H. V. Hallock (1908–1996), American Anglican bishop
- Fanny Hallock Carpenter (1854–1939), American lawyer and clubwoman
- Frank K. Hallock (1860–1937), American neurologist
- Gerard Hallock (1905–1996), American ice hockey player
- Grace Hallock (1893–1967), Americans children's writer
- James L. Hallock (1823–1894), American politician
- James N. Hallock (born 1941), American physicist
- Jeanne Hallock (born 1946), American swimmer
- John Hallock Jr. (1783–1840), Congressman from New York
- Joseph N. Hallock (1861–1942), American politician and banker
- Kevin Hallock (born 1969), American economist and university president
- Kyle Hallock (born 1988), American baseball coach
- Morris G. Hallock (1926–2018), American politician
- Pamela Hallock (born 1948), American marine biologist
- Peter Hallock (1924–2014), American church music composer
- Richard Hallock (1906–1980), American Assyriologist and Elamitologist
- Ty Hallock (born 1971), American football player
- William Hallock (1857–1913), American physicist
