= Farming/language dispersal hypothesis =

Hypothesis about the spread of language families

The farming/language dispersal hypothesis proposes that many of the largest language families in the world dispersed along with the expansion of agriculture. This hypothesis was proposed by archaeologists Peter Bellwood and Colin Renfrew. It has been widely debated and archaeologists, linguists, and geneticists often disagree with all or only parts of the hypothesis.

== The hypothesis ==
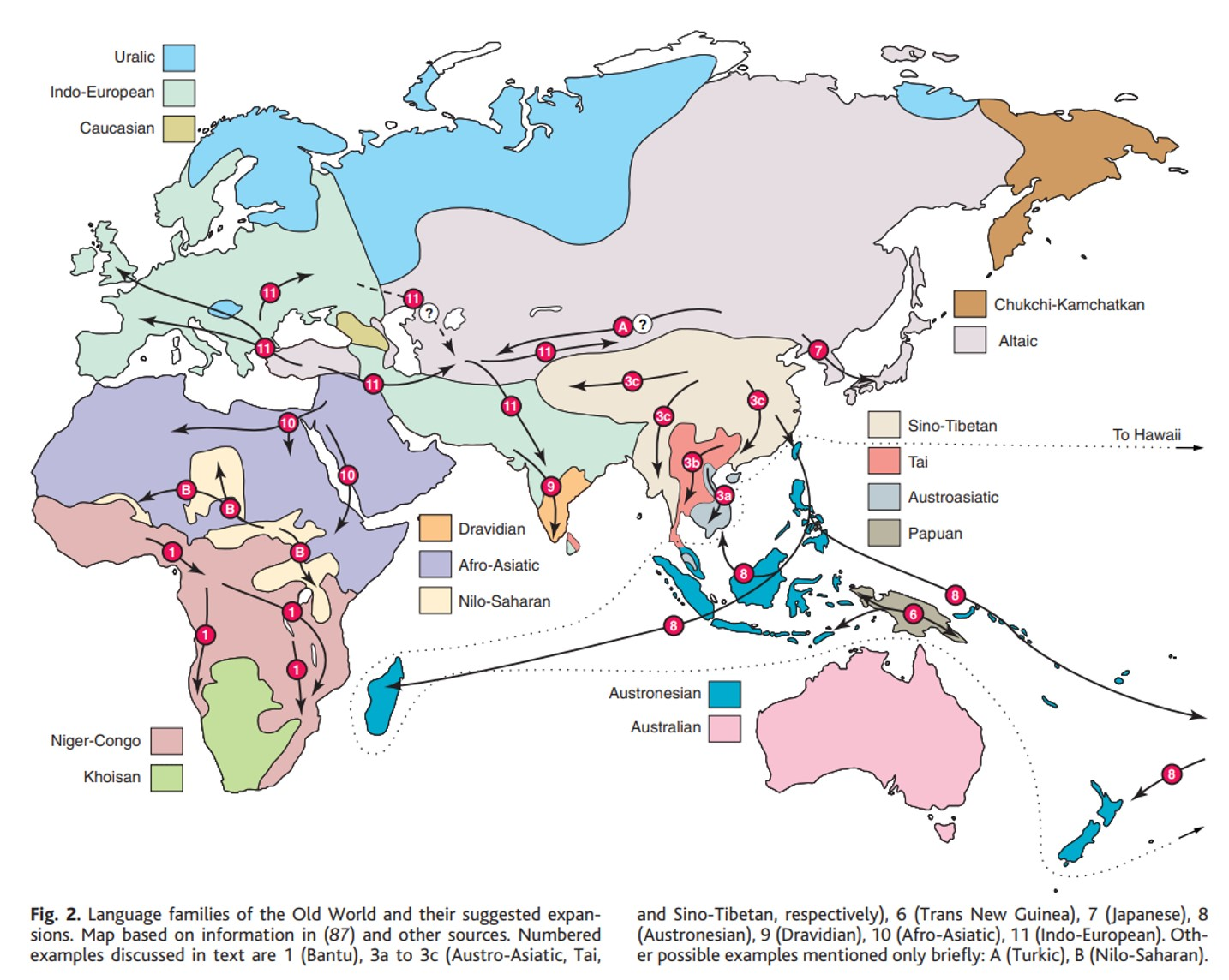
Language families of the Old World and their suggested expansions

The farming/language dispersal hypothesis links the spread of farming in pre-historic times with the spread of languages and language families. The hypothesis is that a language family begins when a society with its own language adopts farming as a primary means of subsistence while its neighbors are hunter-gatherers who speak unrelated languages. A sedentary farming society supports a much greater density of population than its neighboring nomadic or semi-nomadic hunter-gatherers. The language of the farming society displaces that of the hunter-gatherer society which may also become agricultural. Farming and the language of the original farmers spread to more and more societies. In some cases the original language, which evolves over time into many different but related languages, has attained world-wide dispersion.

In sum, "the farming/language dispersal hypothesis makes the radical and controversial proposal that the present-day distributions of many of the world's languages and language families can be traced back to the early developments and dispersals of farming..."

== Examples ==
=== Indo-European ===
The Anatolian hypothesis states that Proto-Indo-Europeans lived in Anatolia throughout the Neolithic period, and that the spread of the Indo-European language was associated with the Neolithic Revolution of the 7th-6th millennium BC. It claims that the Proto-Indo-European language spread from Asia Minor to Europe around 7000 BC with the Neolithic Revolution and peacefully mixed with indigenous peoples. Therefore, most Neolithic Europeans spoke an Indo-European language, and later migrations replaced it with another Indo-European language. However, there is currently more evidence that supports the Kurgan hypothesis, which is another explanation for the origin and dispersal of the Indo-European languages.

=== Bantu ===
The Bantu languages descend from a common Proto-Bantu language, which is believed to have been spoken in what is now Cameroon in Central Africa. An estimated 2,500–3,000 years ago (1000 BC to 500 BC), speakers of the Proto-Bantu language began a series of migrations eastward and southward, carrying agriculture with them. This Bantu expansion came to dominate Sub-Saharan Africa east of Cameroon, an area where Bantu peoples now constitute nearly the entire population. Some other sources estimate the Bantu Expansion started closer to ~5,000 years ago.

=== Afro-Asiatic ===
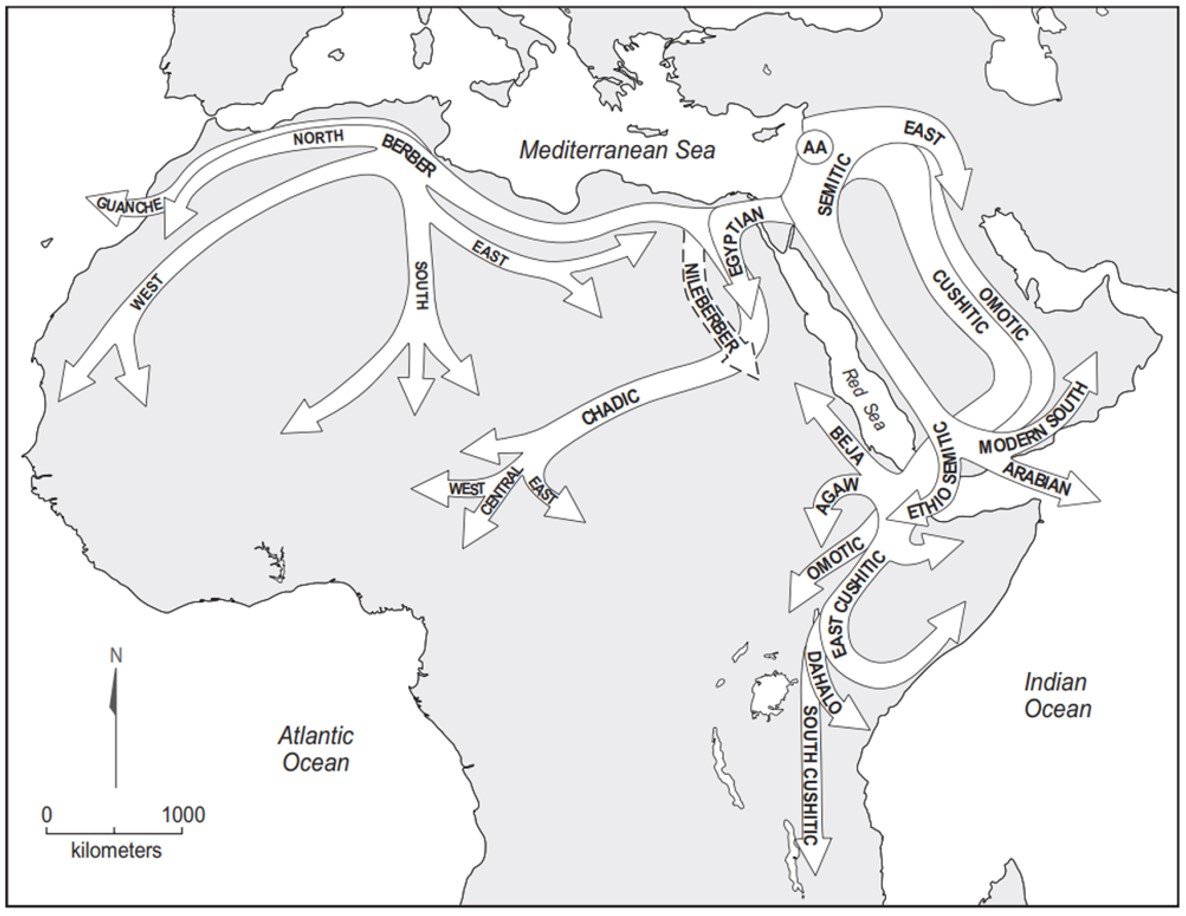
A hypothesis by linguist Vaclav Blazek

There are two hypotheses about the origin of the Proto-Afroasiatic languages, the Levant theory and the African continental theory. According to the theory of a homeland in Levant, the distribution was expanded to Africa in conjunction with the spread of agriculture. Terrazas Mata et al. (2013) have argued that the Proto-Afro-Asiatic speakers would have originated in the Middle East and subsequently migrated into the areas of North Africa, and the Horn of Africa. There are however many scholars who accept an African phylum language origin since five of the six Afro-Asiatic subfamilies are spoken on the African continent, and only one in Asia. Christopher Ehret, S.O. Y. Keita, and Paul Newman have also argued that archaeology does not indicate a spread of migrating farmers into northern Africa, but rather a gradual incorporation of animal husbandry into indigenous foraging cultures.

=== Nostratic ===
Bomhard (2008) suggested that the Proto-Nostratic language differentiated with the onset of the Levant Neolithic Revolution in 8,000 BC, and spread across Fertile Crescent to Caucasus (Proto-Kartvelian), beyond Egypt and the Red Sea to Horn of Africa (Proto-Afro-Asiatic), to Iranian Plateau (Proto-Elamo-Dravidian), and to Central Asia (Proto-Eurasiatic, then Proto-Indo-European, Proto-Altaic, and Proto-Uralic in 5,000 BC).

=== Elamo-Dravidian ===
Elamo-Dravidian hypothetical language family is often associated with the spread of farming from the Fertile Crescent to the Indus Valley Civilization. However, there is some disagreement regarding the linguistic relationship of Elamite with Dravidian languages. Genetic studies have detected a genetic link between Neolithic Iran and South Asians.

=== Transeurasian ===
Martine Robbeets "Transeurasian" model, based on the Macro-Altaic languages (Turkic, Mongolic, Tungusic, Japonic, and Koreanic), argues that Proto-Transeurasian was spoken in Xinglongwa culture in the west Liao river basin in 6th millennium BC, and differentiated to the daughter languages along with the spread of millet agriculture.

=== Japonic ===
Many scholars believe that the Japonic language was brought from the Korean Peninsula to the Japanese archipelago around 700-300 BC by the Yayoi people who cultivated wet rice. According to Martine Robbeets (2017), Japonic language originated from Proto-"Transeurasian" language (the common ancestor of Mongolic, Turkic, Tungusic, Japonic, and Koreanic), located in the Xinglongwa culture in the 6th millennium BC. She suggest Proto-Transeurasian people cultivated millet, but after branching to the "Japono-Koreanic" language family in the Liaodong Peninsula, Proto-Japonic was influenced by Para-Austronesian who cultivated wet rice in the Shandong Peninsula in the 2nd-3rd millennium BC, borrowed a large amount of vocabulary mainly related to agriculture, and then went south on the Korean Peninsula and entered the Japanese archipelago in the 1st millennium BC. It is also proposed that the distribution of Japanese has expanded with the expansion of wet rice cultivation in the Japanese archipelago.

=== Austronesian ===
It is proposed that the spread of Austronesian languages was driven by farming.

=== Sino-Tibetan ===
Since 2019, phylogenetic studies of 50 Sino-Tibetan languages that have existed from ancient times to the present day have proved the hypothesis that the language family expanded with agricultural transmission. It is concluded that the Sino-Tibetan language family originated from the millet farming people located in North China 7,200 years ago.

=== Austroasiatic ===
Several theories exist about the Urheimat of Austroasiatic languages; the Red River Delta, the Mekong River region, the Zhu River region, the Yangtze River region, and the north of the Yangtze River. Proto-Austro-Asiatic speaking people were farmers who cultivated rice and millet and raised dogs, pigs, chickens, etc., but without millet cultivation (with only rice cultivation and some livestock farming), around 4500 BC, it reached Indochina and replaced native hunter-gatherers.

=== Uto-Aztecan ===
It is suggested that Uto-Aztecan speakers expanded to Mesoamerica and Southwestern US with corn farming.
