= Hallock =

Hallock may refer to:

== Places ==
In the United States:

- Hallock, Minnesota
- Hallock Township, Minnesota
- Hallock Township, Illinois

== Other uses ==
- Hallock (surname)

== See also ==
- Halleck (disambiguation)
