= Elamo-Dravidian languages =

Proposed language family

Elamo-Dravidian
- Zagrosian
- (controversial)
- Geographic distribution: South Asia, West Asia
- Linguistic classification: Proposed language family
- Subdivisions: Elamite; Dravidian

Language codes
- Glottolog: None

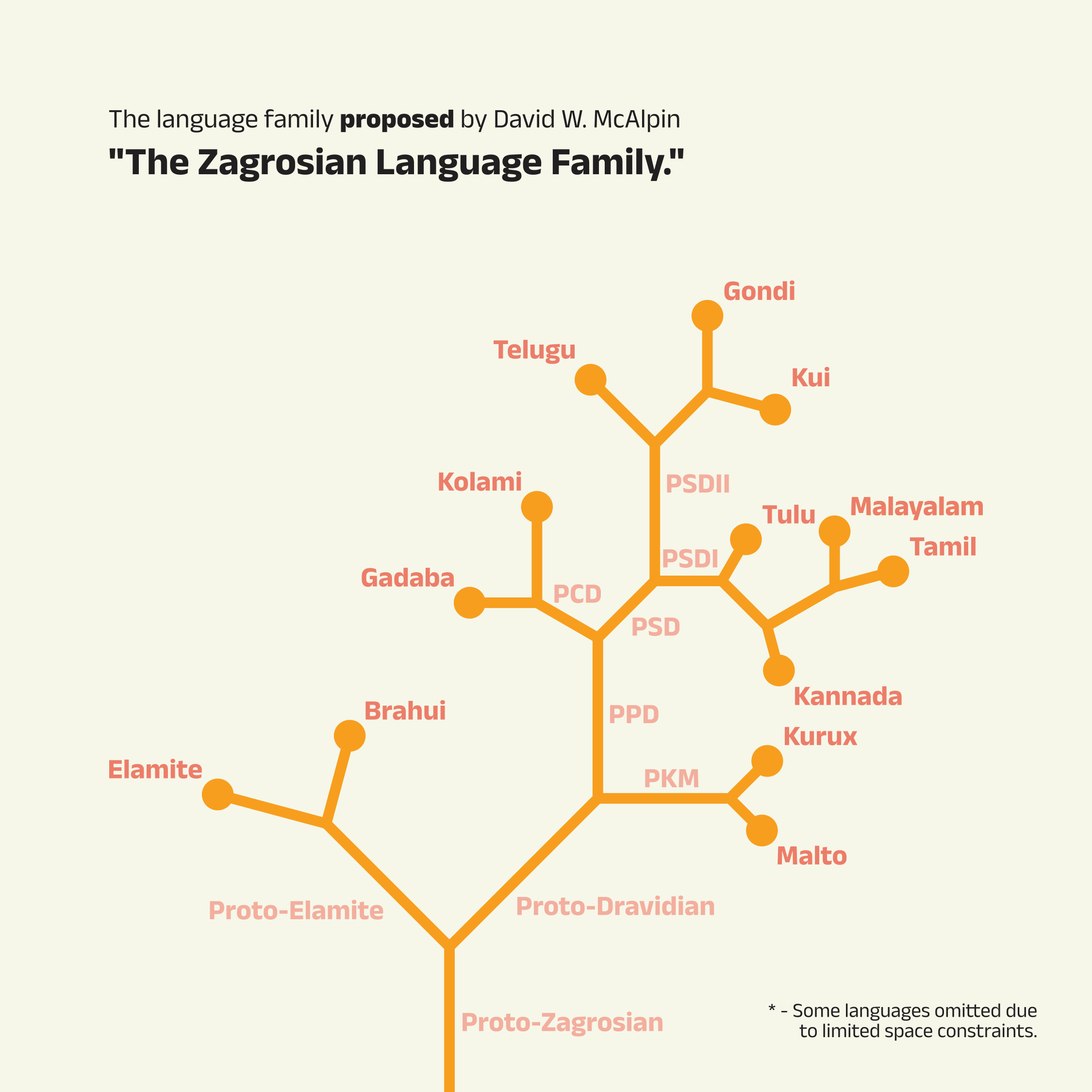
The hypothesized tree of the Elamo-Dravidian family by David McAlpin

The Elamo-Dravidian language family (also known as the Zagrosian language family) is a hypothesised language family that links the Elamite language of ancient Elam (present-day southwestern Iran and southeastern Iraq) to the Dravidian languages of South Asia. Later versions (2015–) of the hypothesis entail a reclassification of Brahui as being more closely related to Elamite than to the remaining Dravidian languages. Linguist David McAlpin has been a chief proponent of the Elamo-Dravidian hypothesis, followed by Franklin Southworth as the other major supporter. The hypothesis has gained attention in academic circles, but has been subject to serious criticism by linguists, and remains only one of several possible scenarios for the origins of the Dravidian languages. (Note: Renfrew and Bahn conclude that several scenarios are compatible with the data, and that "the linguistic jury is still very much out.") Elamite is generally accepted by scholars to be a language isolate, unrelated to any other known language.

== History of the proposal ==
The concept that Elamite and Dravidian are in some way related dates from the beginnings of both fields in the early nineteenth century. Edwin Norris was the first to publish an article in support of the hypothesis in 1853. Further evidence was proposed by Robert Caldwell when he published a comparative linguistics book in 1856 about the Dravidian languages. David McAlpin, assistant professor of Dravidian languages and linguistics at the University of Pennsylvania, published a series of papers providing evidence supporting the theory. He also speculated that the Harappan language (the language of the Indus Valley Civilization) might also have been part of this family.

Later, McAlpin investigated the relationship between Elamitic, Brahui, and the rest of the Dravidian languages with more care, and came to the conclusion that Brahui is more closely related to Elamitic than to the others. He even proposed that Brahui should rather be considered as 'modern Elamitic' than as a Dravidian language:

Brahui is Elamitic. The location presents no problems. Western Brahui overlaps Elamite sites in Iranian Baluchistan.

— David McAlpin

== Linguistic arguments ==
According to David McAlpin, the Dravidian languages were brought to present day Pakistan by immigration from the Middle East via Elam, located in present-day southwestern Iran. McAlpin (1975) in his study identified some similarities between Elamite and Dravidian. He proposed that 20% of Dravidian and Elamite vocabulary are cognates while 12% are probable cognates. He further claimed that Elamite and Dravidian possess similar second-person pronouns and parallel case endings. They have a number of similar derivatives, abstract nouns, and the same verb stem+tense marker+personal ending structure. Both have two positive tenses, a "past" and a "non-past".

Morphological correspondences proposed by McAlpin
Morpheme	Proto-Dravidian	Brahui	Proposed correspondents in Elamite
Subject	unmarked	unmarked	unmarked
Direct Object	stem change with -Vn or -ay	stem change with -ē (object case)	-n (personal pronouns only)
Indirect Object	stem change with -(k)ku (dative/ allative)	stem change with -ē (object case) stem change with -ki ( benefactive)	postposition ikki (dative/ allative)
Possessor	stem change with -a/ā, -in, -(t)tu, or -atu	stem change with -nā	-n(a) as a suffix on nouns (but seemingly a late evolution)

Pedron states that, while McAlpin’s set of case morphemes corresponds looks very similar to the Dravidian case system, it is “a made up set” because the morphemes are selected from different parts of Elamite grammar, in particular noting that the Elamite genitive -na seems to have evolved late in the written record from an earlier gender agreement-based system.

== Reception ==
The hypothesis has gained attention in academic circles but is difficult to assess due to the limited resources on the Elamite language. Supporters of the Elamo-Dravidian hypothesis include Igor M. Diakonoff and Franklin Southworth.

For the majority of historical linguists, the Elamo-Dravidian hypothesis remains unproven, and Elamite is generally accepted by scholars to be a language isolate, unrelated to any other known language. Bhadriraju Krishnamurti regarded McAlpin's proposed morphological correspondences between Elamite and Dravidian to be ad hoc, and found them to be lacking phonological motivation. Similar criticisms have been made by Kamil Zvelebil and others. Georgiy Starostin criticized them as no closer than correspondences with other nearby language families. A 2023 reassessment by Filippo Pedron similarly concluded that the evidence by McAlpin in the intervening years did not constitute sufficient evidence for a genetic relationship either between Elamite and Proto-Dravidian or between Elamite and Brahui.

== Spread of farming ==
Apart from the linguistic similarities, the Elamo-Dravidian hypothesis rests on the claim that agriculture spread from the Near East to the Indus Valley region via Elam. This would suggest that agriculturalists brought a new language as well as farming from Elam. Supporting ethno-botanical data include the Near Eastern origin and name of wheat (D. Fuller). Later evidence of extensive trade between Elam and the Indus Valley Civilization suggests ongoing links between the two regions.

Renfrew and Cavalli-Sforza have also argued that Proto-Dravidian was brought to the Indus Valley by farmers from the Fertile Crescent, (Note: From Derenko's introduction: "The spread of these new technologies has been associated with the dispersal of Dravidian and Indo-European languages in southern Asia. It is hypothesized that the proto-Elamo-Dravidian language, most likely originated in the Elam province in southwestern Iran, spread eastwards with the movement of farmers to the Indus Valley and the Indian sub-continent." Derenko refers to: * Renfrew (1987), Archaeology and Language: The Puzzle of Indo-European Origins * Renfrew (1996), Language families and the spread of farming. In: Harris DR, editor, The origins and spread of Agriculture and Pastoralism in Eurasia, pp. 70–92 * Cavalli-Sforza, Menozzi, Piazza (1994), The History and Geography of Human Genes.) but more recently Heggarty and Renfrew noted that "McAlpin's analysis of the language data, and thus his claims, remain far from orthodoxy", adding that Fuller finds no relation of Dravidian languages with other languages, and thus assumes it to be native to India. Renfrew and Bahn conclude that several scenarios are compatible with the data, and that "the linguistic jury is still very much out".

Narasimhan et al. (2019) conclude that the Iranian ancestral component in the IVC people was contributed by people related to but distinct from Iranian agriculturalists, lacking the Anatolian farmer-related ancestry which was common in Iranian farmers after 6000 BCE. (Note: Narasimhan et al.: "[One possibility is that] Iranian farmer–related ancestry in this group was characteristic of the Indus Valley hunter-gatherers in the same way as it was characteristic of northern Caucasus and Iranian plateau hunter-gatherers. The presence of such ancestry in hunter-gatherers from Belt and Hotu Caves in northeastern Iran increases the plausibility that this ancestry could have existed in hunter-gatherers farther east." Shinde et al. (2019) note that these Iranian people "had little if any genetic contribution from [...] western Iranian farmers or herders"; they split from each other more than 12,000 years ago. See also Razib Kkan, The Day of the Dasa: "...it may, in fact, be the case that ANI-like quasi-Iranians occupied northwest South Asia for a long time, and AHG populations hugged the southern and eastern fringes, during the height of the Pleistocene.") Those Iranian farmers-related people may have arrived in Pakistan before the advent of farming in the Indus Valley, and mixed later, with people related to Indian hunter-gatherers c. 5400 to 3700 BCE, before the advent of the mature IVC. (Note: Mascarenhas et al. (2015) note that "new, possibly West Asian, body types are reported from the graves of Mehrgarh beginning in the Togau phase (3800 BCE).") Sylvester et al. (2019) noted that (referring to Renfrew (1996)) "the existence of Brahui speakers, solitary Dravidian language speakers in Balochistan in Pakistan, supports the Elamo-Dravidian hypothesis", (Note: Sylvester et al. (2019) refer to Renfrew (1996), Language families and the spread of farming. In: Harris DR, editor, The origins and spread of Agriculture and Pastoralism in Eurasia, pp. 70–92.) and concluded that bidirectional migration and admixture occurred during neolithic times.

== Sources ==
- Cavalli-Sforza LL, Menozzi P, Piazza A (1994). The History and Geography of Human Genes. Princeton University Press.
- Derenko M, Malyarchuk B, Bahmanimehr A, Denisova G, Perkova M, Farjadian S, Yepiskoposyan L (2013). "Complete mitochondrial DNA diversity in Iranians". PLOS ONE. 8 (11) e80673. Bibcode:2013PLoSO...880673D. doi:10.1371/journal.pone.0080673. PMC 3828245. PMID 24244704.
- Mascarenhas, Desmond D.; Raina, Anupuma; Aston, Christopher E.; Sanghera, Dharambir K. (2015). "Genetic and Cultural Reconstruction of the Migration of an Ancient Lineage". BioMed Research International. 2015: 1–16. doi:10.1155/2015/651415. PMC 4605215. PMID 26491681.
- Narasimhan, Vagheesh M.; Patterson, N.J.; Moorjani, Priya; Rohland, Nadin; et al. (2019), "The Formation of Human Populations in South and Central Asia", Science, 365 (6457) eaat7487, Bibcode:2019Sci...365t7487N, doi:10.1126/science.aat7487, PMC 6822619, PMID 31488661
- Shinde, Vasant; Narasimhan, Vagheesh M.; Rohland, Nadin; Mallick, Swapan; Mah, Matthew; Lipson, Mark; Nakatsuka, Nathan; Adamski, Nicole; Broomandkhoshbacht, Nasreen; Ferry, Matthew; Lawson, Ann Marie; Michel, Megan; Oppenheimer, Jonas; Stewardson, Kristin; Jadhav, Nilesh; Kim, Yong Jun; Chatterjee, Malavika; Munshi, Avradeep; Panyam, Amrithavalli; Waghmare, Pranjali; Yadav, Yogesh; Patel, Himani; Kaushik, Amit; Thangaraj, Kumarasamy; Meyer, Matthias; Patterson, Nick; Rai, Niraj; Reich, David (October 2019). "An Ancient Harappan Genome Lacks Ancestry from Steppe Pastoralists or Iranian Farmers". Cell. 179 (3): 729–735.e10. doi:10.1016/j.cell.2019.08.048. PMC 6800651. PMID 31495572.
- Sylvester, Charles (2019), "Maternal genetic link of a south Dravidian tribe with native Iranians indicating bidirectional migration", Annals of Human Biology, 46 (2): 175–180, doi:10.1080/03014460.2019.1599067, PMID 30909755, S2CID 85516060
