= Susian =

Susian may refer to:

- Susians, inhabitants of Susa, an ancient city in the lower Zagros Mountains, Iran
- Susian language, another name for the Elamite language
