= Halleck =

Halleck may refer to:

== People ==
=== Given name ===
- Halleck J. Mantz (1877–1958), jurist
- Halleck Tustenuggee (c. 1807–?), Seminole warchief

=== Surname ===
- Charles A. Halleck (1900–1986), American politician
- DeeDee Halleck (born 1940), American media activist
- Fitz-Greene Halleck (1790–1867), American poet
- Henry Halleck (1815–1872), American soldier, scholar, and lawyer
- Paul Halleck (1913–1974), American football player

=== Characters ===
- Billy Halleck, a character in the 1984 novel Thinner by Stephen King
- Gurney Halleck, a character in the Dune novels of Frank Herbert

== Places ==
- Halleck, Missouri
- Halleck, Nevada
- Halleck, West Virginia

== Other ==
- Halleck Formation, geologic formation in Alaska
- Halleck Range, mountain range in Alaska

== See also ==
- Fort Halleck (disambiguation)
- Manhattan Community Access Corp. v. Halleck, court case
- Dave Hallack (born 1966), English cricketer
- Hallock (disambiguation)
