= Neo-Elamite =

Neo-Elamite may refer to:

- Neo-Elamite language, a stage in the history of the Elamite language
- Neo-Elamite period, a period in the political history of Elam
