= David W. McAlpin =

American linguist

David Wayne McAlpin (20 February 1945 – 23 December 2023) was an American linguist who specialized in Elamitic and Dravidian languages. Born in West Frankfort, Illinois, he received his bachelor’s degree in linguistics at the University of Chicago, studying under A. K. Ramanujan. Following this, he received his Ph.D. in linguistics at the University of Wisconsin–Madison and an M.B.A. from the Wharton School at the University of Pennsylvania. He is best known for his work attempting to demonstrate a genetic relationship between Elamite language and the Dravidian languages.

== Contribution to Linguistics ==
McAlpin is best known for a series of articles attempting to demonstrate a relationship between the ancient Elamite language of Iran and the Dravidian languages of southern India, known as the Zagrosian Hypothesis. Whereas his Proto-Elamo-Dravidian: The Evidence and Its Implications focuses on cognation between Elamite and all of Dravidian, his most recent three papers argue for the claim that Brahui, in general considered to be one of three North Dravidian languages, instead would be a descendant of an unattested eastern dialect of Elamite (and thus not closer related to the two (other) North Dravidian languages Kurukh and Malto than to the others in this language family).

He was a member of the DravLing group, in which he presented a talk entitled “Morphology in Proto-Zagrosian” in 2022.

== Articles ==
- McAlpin, David (2022). "Modern Colloquial Eastern Elamite". Al-Burz. 14 (1): 64–123. doi:10.54781/abz.v14i1.370.
- McAlpin, David (2015). "Brahui and the Zagrosian Hypothesis". Journal of the American Oriental Society. 135 (3): 551–586. doi:10.7817/jameroriesoci.135.3.551.
- McAlpin, David (2003). "Velars, Uvulars, and the North Dravidian Hypothesis". Journal of the American Oriental Society. 123 (3): 521–546. doi:10.2307/3217749. JSTOR 3217749.
- McAlpin, David (1998). "Coarticulations and Coronals in Malayalam". Journal of the American Oriental Society. 118 (3): 401–405. doi:10.2307/606069. JSTOR 606069.
- McAlpin, David (1980). "Is Brahui Really Dravidian?". Proceedings of the Sixth Annual Meeting of the Berkeley Linguistics Society. 6: 66–72. doi:10.3765/bls.v6i0.2113.
- McAlpin, David (1974). "Toward Proto-Elamo-Dravidian". Language. 50 (1): 89–101. doi:10.2307/412012. JSTOR 412012.
- McAlpin, David (1972). The Malayalam Verb Phrase in a Generative Matrical Framework. University of Wisconsin–Madison [Thesis Dissertation].

== Books ==
- McAlpin, David (2004). A Core Vocabulary for Tamil. Chicago: Digital South Asia Library.
- McAlpin, David (1981). Proto-Elamo-Dravidian: The Evidence and Its Implications. Philadelphia: American Philosophical Society.
