= Khuzi language =

Extinct language of ancient Iran

Khuzi
- Huzi
- Region: Southwestern Iran; Ancient Susiana
- Extinct: c. 1000 AD?
- Language family: Language isolate?
- Early form: Southwest Iranian

Official status
- Official language in: Ancient Persia (Iran)

Language codes
- ISO 639-3: –

The Khuzi language (Persian: هوزی, romanized: Hūzi; also Susian) was the language spoken by the ancient inhabitants of the region known historically as Susiana (modern Khuzestan Province in southwestern Iran).

The name of this people appears in old Persian as 'Uvaja' (Persian: اووَجَه / اووَژه, romanized: uvaja/uvja) and in Achaemenid inscriptions as Hūjiya, which became Huzi in the Middle Persian, and Arab writers recorded it as 'Khūzī' years later. Today the language is referred to as the “Huzi language”, and in some sources as the “Khuzi language”.

== Etymology ==
Greek historians recorded it as 'Uxi' (Persian: اوکسی). In fact, the 'U' at the beginning was correct according to the Achaemenid inscriptions.

Concerning the change of the name from 'Uvja' and 'Uvzi' to 'Huzi', this consonantal shift is readily observable in the contemporary dialects of southwestern Iranian dialects, such as Luri and Bakhtiari (which are spoken in and around Khuzestan), the letter 'h' is sometimes used to represent the sound 'u'. In ancient Persian dialects and the Pahlavi language, the sound 'oo' could change to 'hoo', as seen in words such as 'Oormazd' becoming 'Hoormazd', or 'Ooshmand' becoming 'Hooshmand'.

Some sources suggest that the Huzis were descendants of the Elamites. However, according to ancient Iranian writings and books preserved by the Parsis (Zoroastrians) of India, there is no evidence that the Huzis were of Elamite origin. The Huzi language and culture possessed distinctive characteristics and features unique to themselves. The Huzi language remained in use in Khuzestan until the Sasanian period and even for several centuries after the Muslim conquest of Iran. The present-day inhabitants of southwestern Iran continue to preserve numerous cultural and linguistic traces of traditions attributed to the Huzis. The name of Khuzestan (Huzistan), as well as cities such as Ahvaz and Hoveyzeh, reflects the historical presence of this people and their language in the region.

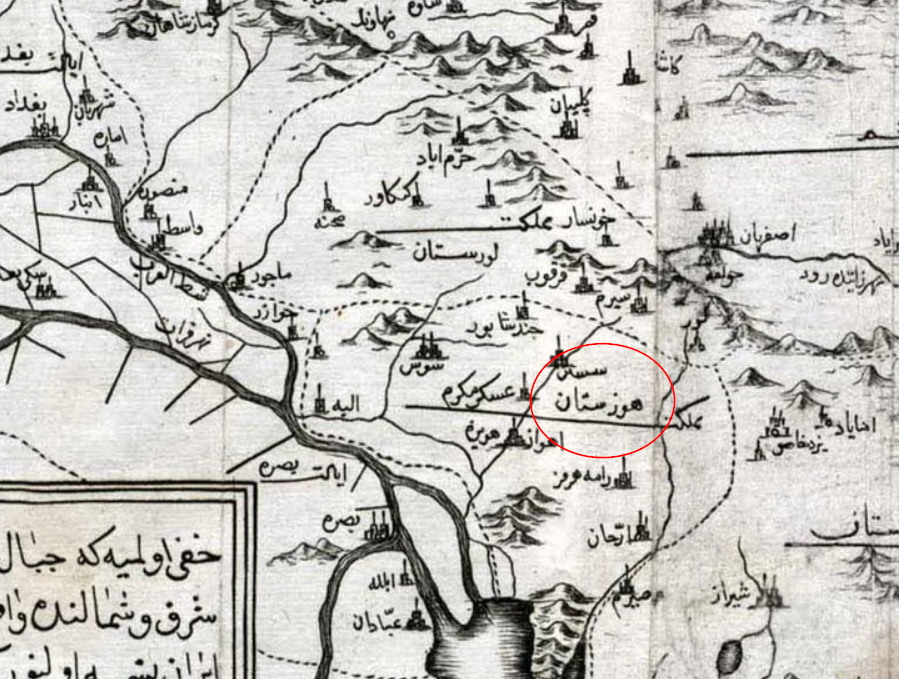
In a map of Iran from the Safavid dynasty, the name “Huzestan” is still used for the region inhabited by Huzi speakers.

== Academic classification ==
The oldest handwritten historical accounts of this people come first from Ibn al-Muqaffa' (c. 724–759 CE) and later from Ibn Hawqal (c. 978 CE), both of whom recorded this people in Arabic in the form Khuzi. On the one hand, however, Achaemenid inscriptions (520–330 BC) already mention a land called Hūjiya (Ḫūz / Ḫūzī), which is associated with the area of present-day Khuzestan, on the other hand, according to the surviving persian documents and maps, the name of the province was written officially in the form Huzistan until the end of the Safavid era (1501–1736).

Gilbert Lazard states, based on a report in the medieval book al-Fihrist quoting Ibn al-Muqaffa', that Iranians in the late Sasanian period spoke five languages:

1. Pahlavi: spoken in the region of ancient Media.
2. Dari: spoken in the capital of Iran (Ctesiphon).
3. Old Persian: language of priests and scholars.
4. Huzi: spoken in Huzistan.
5. Syriac: spoken in Sawād (Sūrīstān), located in southern Mesopotamia

According to Lazard, early Islamic historical sources do not provide a complete picture of the languages of Iran. From scattered reports by geographers and historians, it is said that the Huzi language could not even be properly written using the Arabic script.

Bertold Spuler notes that the language spoken in Khuzestan was Huzi, and: “According to explicit statements of that period, it had no direct relation to Persian or Arabic; even the Arabic script was insufficient for writing it. It is not incorrect to consider this dialect a remnant of the Elamite language.”

For several centuries after the Muslim conquest of Khuzestan, the local language remained Huzi. Masālik al-Mamālik states:

Most of them can speak Persian and Arabic, but they have their own language (the tongue of the Khūziyyān) which is neither Hebrew, nor Syriac, nor Persian.

Ibn Hawqal also writes that, aside from Arabic and Persian, the people of Khuzestan spoke another language that was neither Syriac nor Hebrew.

== History ==
Between the 8th and 13th centuries AD, various Arabic authors refer to a language called Khūzī or Khūz spoken in Khuzistan, which was unlike any other language known to those writers. It is possible that it was "a late variant of Elamite". The last original report on the Khūz language was written circa 988 by al-Maqdisi, characterizing the Huzi as bilingual in Arabic and Persian but also speaking an "incomprehensible" language in Ramhormoz. The city had recently become prosperous again after the foundation of a market when it received an influx of foreigners and being a Khuzi was stigmatized at the time. The language probably went extinct in the 11th century. Later authors only mention the language when citing previous work.

According to Ibn al-Muqaffa', writing in the 8th century, Huzi was:

a language in which kings and nobles spoke privately during play, amusement, and intimate gatherings.

- Richard Frye states that geographers writing in the 10th century CE mention a Huzi language spoken in the Zagros Mountains, interpreted as a continuation of the ancient Elamite tongue.
- “Mahdi Marashi” quotes the author of Ahsan al-Taqāsīm, saying the Huzi mixed a little Persian and Arabic in their speech.
- They said phrases such as: “in ketāb vasle kon” (“repair this book”) and “in kār ghet'e kon” (“finish this job”).
- They used both Arabic and Persian fluently, with certain elongations and emphases in word endings.
- According to Martin Haug, Huzi was likely the second language used in Achaemenid rock inscriptions.

== Sources ==
- Álvarez-Mon, Javier; Basello, Gian Pietro; Wicks, Jasmina, eds. (2018). The Elamite World. London/New York: Routledge. ISBN 9781315658032.
- van Bladel, Kevin (2021). "The Language Of The Xūz And The Fate Of Elamite". Journal of the Royal Asiatic Society. 31 (3): 447–462. doi:10.1017/S1356186321000092.
