= Persepolis Administrative Archives =

Clay administrative archives found in Persepolis dating to the Achaemenid Persian Empire

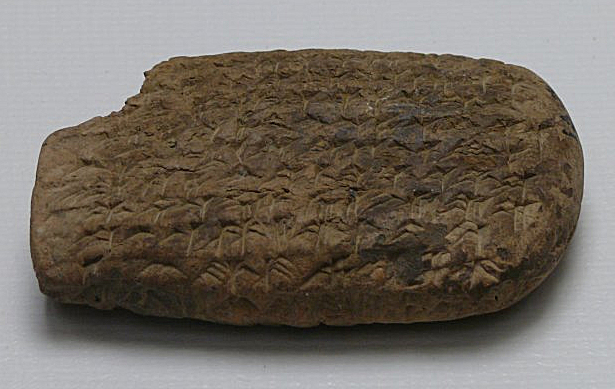
Persepolis tablet

The Persepolis Administrative Archive (also Fortification Archive or Treasury Archive) are two groups of clay administrative archive — sets of records physically stored together — found in Persepolis dating to the Achaemenid Persian Empire. The discovery was made during legal excavations conducted by the archaeologists from the Oriental Institute of the University of Chicago in the 1930s. Hence they are named for their in situ findspot: Persepolis. The archaeological excavations at Persepolis for the Oriental Institute were initially directed by Ernst Herzfeld from 1931 to 1934 and carried on from 1934 until 1939 by Erich Schmidt.

While the political end of the Achaemenid Empire is symbolized by the burning of Persepolis by Alexander the Great (dated 330/329 BCE), the fall of Persepolis paradoxically contributed to the preservation of the Achaemenid administrative archives that might have been lost due to passage of time and natural and man-made causes. According to archaeological evidence, the partial burning of Persepolis did not affect the Persepolis Fortification Archive tablets, but may have caused the eventual collapse of the upper part of the northern Fortification wall that preserved the tablets until their recovery by the Oriental Institute's archaeologists.

Thousands of clay tablets, fragments and seal impressions in the Persepolis archives are a part of a single administrative system representing continuity of activity and flow of data over more than fifty consecutive years (509 to 457 BCE). These records can throw light on the geography, economy, and administration, as well as the religion and social conditions of the Persepolis region, the heartland of the Persian Great Kings from Darius I the Great to Artaxerxes I.

The Persepolis Administrative Archives are the single most important extant primary source for understanding the internal workings of the Persian Achaemenid Empire. But while these archives have the potential for offering the study of the Achaemenid history based on the sole surviving and substantial records from the heartland of the empire, they are still not fully utilized as such by a majority of historians. The reason for the slow adoption of study of Persepolis administrative archives can also be attributed to the administrative nature of the archives, lacking the drama and excitement of narrative history.

== Persepolis Fortification Archive ==
The Persepolis Fortification Archive (PFA), also known as Persepolis Fortification Tablets (PFT, PF), is a fragment of Achaemenid administrative records of receipt, taxation, transfer, storage of food crops (cereals, fruit), livestock (sheep and goats, cattle, poultry), food products (flour, breads and other cereal products, beer, wine, processed fruit, oil, meat), and byproducts (animal hides) in the region around Persepolis (larger part of modern Fars), and their redistribution to gods, the royal family, courtiers, priests, religious officiants, administrators, travelers, workers, artisans, and livestock.

But before the Persepolis archives could have offered any clues to the better understanding of the Achaemenid history, the clay tablets, mostly written in a late dialect of Elamite, an extremely difficult language still imperfectly understood, had to be deciphered. So, in 1935, Iranian authorities loaned the Persepolis Fortification Archive to the Oriental Institute for research and publication. The archive arrived in Chicago in 1936 and has been under studies since 1937. It was not until 1969, when Richard Hallock published his magisterial edition of 2,087 Elamite Persepolis Fortification Tablets, leading to the renaissance of Achaemenid studies in the 1970s. The long-term project spanning over seven decades is far from completion.

153 tablets, approximately 30,000 fragments and an unknown number of uninscribed tablets were returned to Iran in the 1950s. So far about 450 tablets and tens of thousands of fragments have already been returned to Iran in total. The narrow content of the archive, recording only the Achaemenid administration's transactions dealing with foodstuff, must be taken into consideration in regards to the amount of information that can be deduced from them.

Excavations directed by Ernst Herzfeld at Persepolis between 1933 and 1934 for the Oriental Institute, discovered tens of thousands of unbaked clay tablets, badly broken fragments and bullae in March 1933. Before attempting to build a pathway for easy removal of debris from the ruins of palaces on the Persepolis terrace, Herzfeld decided to excavate the location first to ensure that building a passage would not harm anything. He found two rooms filled up with clay tablets that were arranged in order, as in a library. The uncleaned tablets and fragments were covered up with wax and after drying, they were wrapped up in cotton and packed in 2,353 sequentially numbered boxes for shipping. At the time, Herzfeld estimated that the find included about 30,000 or more inscribed and sealed clay tablets and fragments. However, Herzfeld himself did not leave precise notes and never published a proper archaeological report.

The archive was found at the northeastern corner of the terrace of Persepolis, in two rooms in the fortification wall. The tablets had been stored in a small space near the staircase in the tower in the fortification wall. The upper floor of the fortification wall may have collapsed at the time of the Macedonian invasion, both partially destroying the order of the tablets while protecting them until 1933. The entrance to the rooms were bricked up in antiquity. The tablets cover sixteen years, from 509 to 493 BCE, from the 13th to the 28th regnal year of Darius I the Great. The chronological distribution of the archive is uneven, with the largest concentration from the 22nd and 23rd regnal years.

=== Tablet details ===
There are three main kinds of clay tablets and fragments in the archive:

- Elamite: the remains of more than 15,000 original records in the Elamite language, in cuneiform script.
- Aramaic: the remains of somewhat less than 1,000 original records in the Aramaic language and script.
- Uninscribed: the remains of about 5,000 or more original records with only impressions of seals and no texts.

However, the functional relationships among these components are not still clear.

As of 2010, about 20,000–25,000 tablets and fragments representing about 15,000–18,000 original records remain at the Oriental Institute. Size of the original archive for the same period of time could have been as many as 100,000 Elamite tablets. The edited samples to-date may represent no more than five percent of the original Achaemenid archive. Size of the original archive for the entire reign of Darius I the Great, from 522 to 486 BCE, just for the distribution of foodstuff, could have been as many as 200,000 records.

Current understanding of the archive is based on a sample of the Elamite records that includes 2,120 published texts by Richard Hallock (2,087 tablets in 1969 and 33 tablets in 1978), as well as analysis of 1,148 seals accompanying published Elamite records. About 20 new tablets have also been published after Hallock by various scholars. A majority of the Elamite records are memoranda of single transactions. The earliest known dated Elamite text was written in month 1, regnal year 13 of Darius I the Great (April 509 BCE) and the latest in month 12, regnal year 28 (March/April 493 BCE). The Elamite records mention about 150 places in the region controlled by Achaemenid administration at Persepolis — most of modern Fars, and perhaps parts of modern Khuzestan, including villages, estates, parks and paradises, storehouses, fortresses, treasuries, towns, rivers, and mountains.

A sample transliteration and translation of an Elamite record by Richard Hallock:

PF 53
2 w.pi-ut kur-min m.Šu-te-na-na Ba-ir-ša-an ku-ut-ka hu-ut-ki+MIN-nam
Ba-ka-ba-da Na-ba-ba du-iš-da be-ul 21-na

2 (BAR of) figs, supplied by Šutena, was taken (to) Persepolis, for the (royal) stores.
Bakabada (and) Nababa received (it). 21st year.

About 680 Fortification tablets and fragments with monolingual Aramaic texts (also called Imperial Aramaic) have been identified. Almost all Aramaic records are formed around knotted strings. All Aramaic texts have seal impressions and are incised with styluses or written in ink with pens or brushes, and are similar to Elamite memoranda. They are records of transporting or storing foodstuff, disbursal of seed, disbursal of provisions for travelers, and disbursal of rations for workers.

About 5,000 or more tablets and fragment have only impressions of seals and no texts. Almost all such records are formed around knotted strings. It is noted that none of the uninscribed tablets and fragments bear the seals of high-ranking officials of the Achaemenid administration. Buttons, coins such as Athenian tetradrachms and Achaemenid darics, or other common objects are also used instead of seals in a few cases.

More than 2,200 distinct cylinder seals and stamp seals have been identified, among them scenes of heroic combat, hunting, worship, animals in combat, as well as abstract designs. The number may well increase with study of more records, making Persepolis administrative archives one of the largest collection of imagery in the ancient world, displaying a wide range of styles and skills in the designers and engravers. More than 100 of the seals have inscriptions identifying the owner of the seal or his superior. Many of the seals on the Elamite tablets can be associated with Persepolis administrative officials named in the archives, such as Parnâkka (Old Persian *Farnaka).

Persepolis was inhabited by a multitude of people speaking many different languages. There are unique archival records in other languages that attest to the usage of many languages by the administration at Persepolis, such as:

- One tablet written in Greek recording only the amount of wine and an Aramaic month-name.
- One tablet written in Old Persian recording disbursement of some dry commodity among five villages.
- One tablet written in the Babylonian dialect of Akkadian is a legal document recording the purchase of a slave at Persepolis in the reign of Darius I the Great, among parties and witnesses with Babylonian names. The legal record conforms to Babylonian conventions.
- One tablet written in Phrygian has not been interpreted.
- One tablet written in unknown cuneiform.

Until the discovery of the Persepolis administrative archives, the main sources for information about the Achaemenids were the Greek sources such as Herodotus and ancient historians of Alexander the Great and biblical references in Hebrew Bible, providing a partial and biased view of the ancient Persians.

The archive is an administrative and archival system, representing a complex and extensive institutional economy resulting from careful, long-term and large-scale planning. The archive offers opportunity for research on important subjects like organization and status of workers, regional demography, religious practices, royal road, relation between the state institution and private parties, and record management. Research is yielding a better understanding of the territory under purview of the Achaemenid administrators of Persepolis and the system that underlay the structuring of the territory. Among Persepolis workers, there are as many women as men recorded in the Persepolis Fortification Archive. Some women receive more rations than any of the men in a work group, due to their ranks or special skills. New mothers are also mentioned, where they receive single rations with mothers of boys receiving twice as much as mothers of girls.

Iranian words and names in the Elamite and Aramaic records are the largest source of Old Iranian languages preserved due to their usage in the Persepolis archives, including evidence of lexicon, phonology and dialect variation that are not found elsewhere.

Fragmentary finds with Elamite texts from other sites in the Achaemenid Empire point to similar common practices and administrative activities. Archival records found in Bactria, one of the satrapies of the Achaemenid Empire, use administrative vocabulary, practice and book-keeping found in the Persepolis administrative archives.

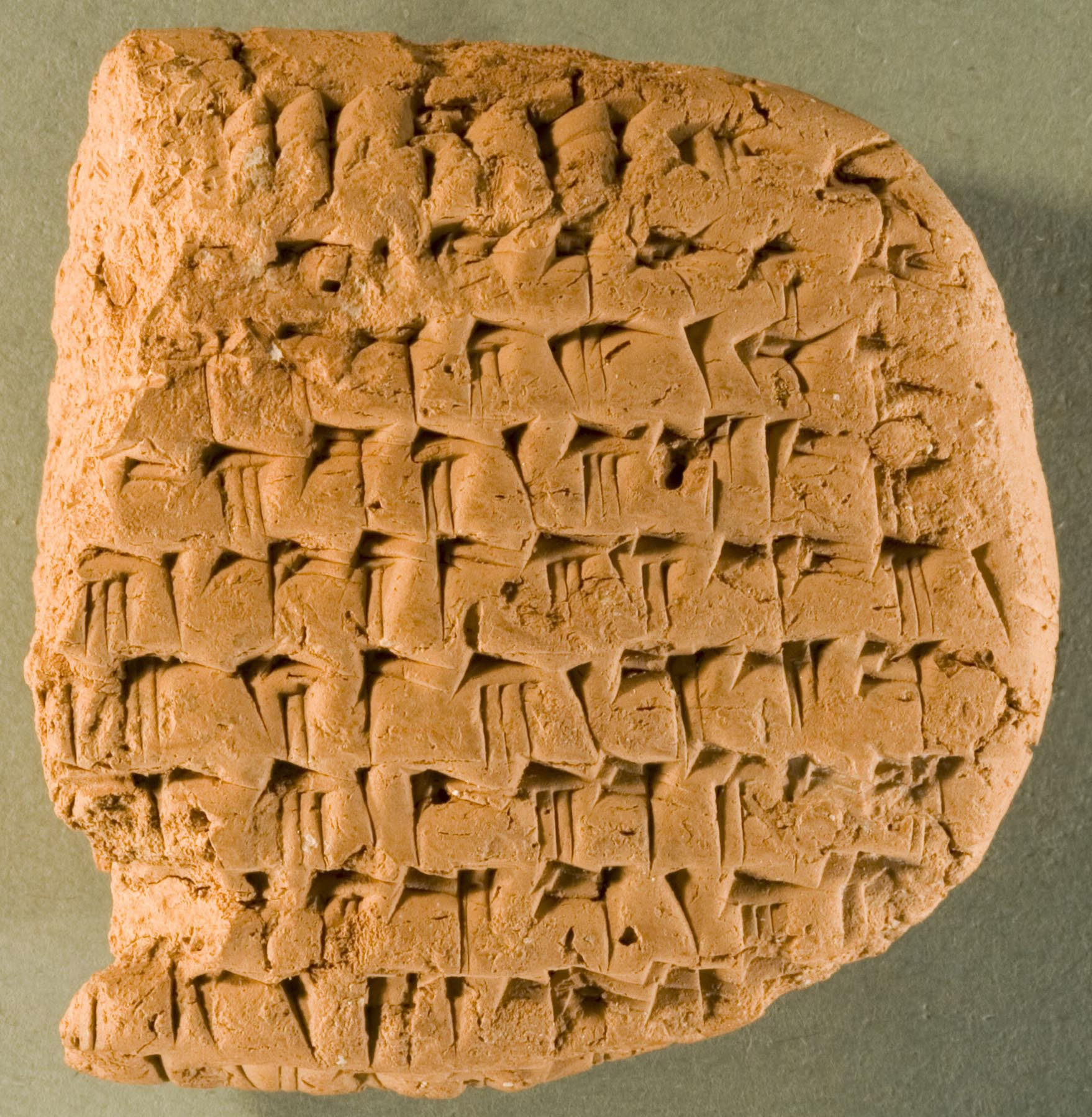
An Old Persian administrative tablet

Discovery of a record written in Old Persian for a routine administrative task challenges the previously held notion that Old Persian language was only used for imperial monumental inscriptions.

Persepolis administration treats all the gods equally. Among various gods named in Persepolis administrative archives receiving food offerings are: Elamite Humban, Inshushinak and Šimat, Mazdean Ahuramazda, Semitic Adad and other gods otherwise unknown. No reference to Mithra has been found in the Persepolis administrative archives. However, M. Schwartz gives a translation by R.T. Hallock "'... the priest received and utilized [16 marris of wine] for Ahura Mazda and the god Mithra and S(h)imut', the latter an Elamite god" further providing "the supplier and priest bear Iranian names."

=== Landmark lawsuit ===
In 2004, the Persepolis Fortification Archive was caught in the middle of a landmark lawsuit in the U.S. Federal Court system.

In 1997, five American tourists were killed and many more were wounded when terrorists set off suitcase bombs in a shopping mall in Jerusalem. The Palestinian organization Hamas claimed responsibility for the bombings.

In 2001, the survivors of the attack and their family members brought lawsuits against Hamas and Iran, claiming Iran had provided financial and logistical support to Hamas. The court agreed and awarded $71.5 million in compensatory damages and $300 million in punitive damages from Iran to the plaintiffs.

In order to collect on the judgment, the plaintiffs sued a number of U.S. museums in 2004, in an attempt to appropriate various Iranian artifacts and collections and sell them to satisfy the claim for damages. Oriental Institute and the Persepolis Fortification Archive were among this group.

The case, Rubin v. Islamic Republic of Iran, was argued December 4, 2017 and decided 8–0 in favor of Iran on February 21, 2018. Since the Persian artifacts were not being used commercially by Iran, they could not be taken under subsections (a) and (g) of 28 U.S.C. § 1610.

The majority view of the academic community as well as international institutions such as UNESCO is the protection of the cultural heritage, exchange and scholarly research must transcend politics.

=== PFA Project ===
The threat of losing the Persepolis Fortification Archive to scholarly research as a result of the litigation since 2004, prompted the Oriental Institute to accelerate and enlarge the PFA Project in 2006, headed by Dr. Matthew Stolper, Professor of Assyriology. Scholars from various universities, students and volunteers are urgently digitizing the Persepolis Fortification Archive and making it available through online resources for further research worldwide.

The PFA Project editors are:

Annalisa Azzoni, Aramaic texts, Vanderbilt University, Nashville
Elspeth Dusinberre, seal impressions on Aramaic texts, University of Colorado, Boulder
Mark Garrison, seal impressions on all components, Trinity University, San Antonio
Wouter Henkelman, Elamite texts, Vrije Universiteit Amsterdam and École pratique des hautes études, Paris
Charles Jones, Elamite texts, Institute for the Study of the Ancient World, New York
Matthew Stolper, Elamite texts, Oriental Institute, Chicago

== Persepolis Treasury Archive ==
Excavations directed by Erich Schmidt at Persepolis between 1934 and 1939 for the Oriental Institute, discovered a second group of clay tablets and fragments that became known as the Persepolis Treasury Archive (PTA), also known as Persepolis Treasury Tablets (PTT). They were packed in small metal cigarette boxes, filled with sawdust for shipping to Tehran.

Persepolis Treasury Archive deals mostly with payments of silver from the Persepolis treasury made in lieu of partial or full in-kind rations of sheep, wine, or grain to workers and artisans employed at or near Persepolis. Some records are administrative letters ordering payments to groups of workers and confirmation that such payments were made.

=== Location ===
Persepolis Treasury Archive was found on the southeastern part of Persepolis terrace in the block of buildings identified as the "Royal Treasury" where small pieces of gold leaves were found, hence the name Persepolis Treasury Archive.

=== Components ===
There are two main kinds of clay tablets and fragments in the Persepolis Treasury Archive:

- Elamite: records in Elamite language and cuneiform script.
- Uninscribed: objects of various shapes with impressions of stamp seals, cylinder seals and seal rings. Many of them have marks of strings that secured bags or boxes and/or attached the sealings to containers.
- One tablet written in the Babylonian dialect of Akkadian, is the Treasury records of taxes paid in silver by three (3) individuals at an unknown location in regnal years 19th and 20th of Darius I the Great.

=== Numbers ===
A total find of 746 clay tablets and fragments were reported by the excavators — 198 tablets and large fragments and 548 smaller fragments. 46 clay tablets were given to the Oriental Institute by the Iranian authorities and the rest were sent to the Museum of Ancient Iran (modern National Museum of Iran) in Tehran. A part of the collection has been in the Tablet Hall of the National Museum of Iran since 1998. 199 sealings without inscriptions were also found during the excavation.

=== Scope ===
Persepolis Treasury Archive covers thirty five (35) years, from 492 to 457 BCE, from regnal year 30th of Darius I the Great, to regnal year 7th of Artaxerxes I, with largest concentration from regnal years 19th and 20th of Xerxes.

==== Sample ====
A sample transliteration and translation of an Elamite record from Persepolis Treasury Archive by George Cameron:

No. 1957:5
ma-u-ú-iš kán-za-bar-ra tu-ru-iš ir-da-tak-ma na-an KI.MIN 2 kur-šá-am KÚ.BABBAR şa-ik pír-nu-ba-ik
gal-na SÌ.SÌ-du gal ruh mu-ši-in sìk-ki-ip i-ia-an-uk-ku-ma ma-u-ú-iš da-ma gal
Edge [ITU ha-ši-ia-ti]-iš-
Reverse n [a be-ul] 19-um-me-man-na 4 ruh un-ra [Lines 12–15 completely destroyed li]-ka du-me
ba-ka-gi-i-a(sic!)-ik-mar

(To) Vahush the treasurer speak, Artataxma says: 2 karsha silver, the remaining half of the wage,
give as wages to men, accountants at the court, sub-ordinate to Vahush.
(It is) the wage for the month Açiyadiya(?) of the 19th year.
4 men, each...
Lines 12–15 destroyed.
[This sealed order] has been given. The receipt (came) from Bagagiya.

=== Significance ===
Persepolis archives are a rich resource for the study of all the official languages used in the Persian Achaemenid Empire, both individually and collectively in connection with each other.

Persepolis Treasury Archive furthermore contributes to the study of economic history by providing a record of the introduction of coined silver money to the regional economy of the Persepolis and its eventual adoption. Persepolis Fortification Archive, a generation before the Persepolis Treasury Archive, only attests to the payment in-kind at Persepolis (wine, beer, grain, flour, sheep, and the like).

== Other Achaemenid records from Persepolis ==
Excavations directed by Akbar Tajvidi at Persepolis between 1968 and 1973, recovered more clay tablets. Excavating the upper towers of the fortification wall on top of Kuh-e Rahmat (Mountain of Mercy), excavators found sealed uninscribed Achaemenid Bullae. From a group of 52 uninscribed sealings, some impressions were similar to the sealings found in the Persepolis Treasury Archive.

Future excavations in the areas currently unexcavated, such as the southeastern part of the Persepolis terrace and mountain fortifications, might yield other archives.

== Online resources ==
- OCHRE – The Online Cultural and Historical Research Environment – at the Oriental Institute of the University of Chicago is the main online database for the Persepolis Fortification Archive (PFA) Project, where all the components of the Persepolis Administrative Archives – Elamite, Aramaic, glyptic, and miscellany – can be seen, linked and searched.
- InscriptiFact – The West Semitic Research Project – at the University of Southern California (USC) is a site that produces two kinds of high resolution online images of the Persepolis Fortification Archive tablets in collaboration with the Oriental Institute, allowing online handling of the images.
- CDLI – The Cuneiform Digital Library Initiative – at the University of California, Los Angeles, (UCLA), is a site that provides fast, low resolution online images of the Persepolis Fortification Archive Elamite tablets.
- Achemenet and MAVI – at Collège de France is a site for Achaemenid studies, providing full editions and translations of Persepolis Fortification Archive components. These editions are linked to MAVI interface to view high resolution online images on the Virtual Achaemenid Museum.
- ARTA – Achaemenid Research on Texts and Archaeology – at Collège de France is the site for Achaemenid studies online journal, providing periodic bulletins on the discoveries made in the course of studying Persepolis Administrative Archives.

== See also ==
- Achaemenid Empire
- Aramaic
- Chicago's Persian heritage crisis
- Darius I the Great
- Elamite cuneiform
- Elamite language
- Old Persian cuneiform
- Old Persian language
- Institute for the Study of Ancient Cultures
- Persepolis
- Xerxes I of Persia
