= Elamite cuneiform =

Script used to write the Elamite language

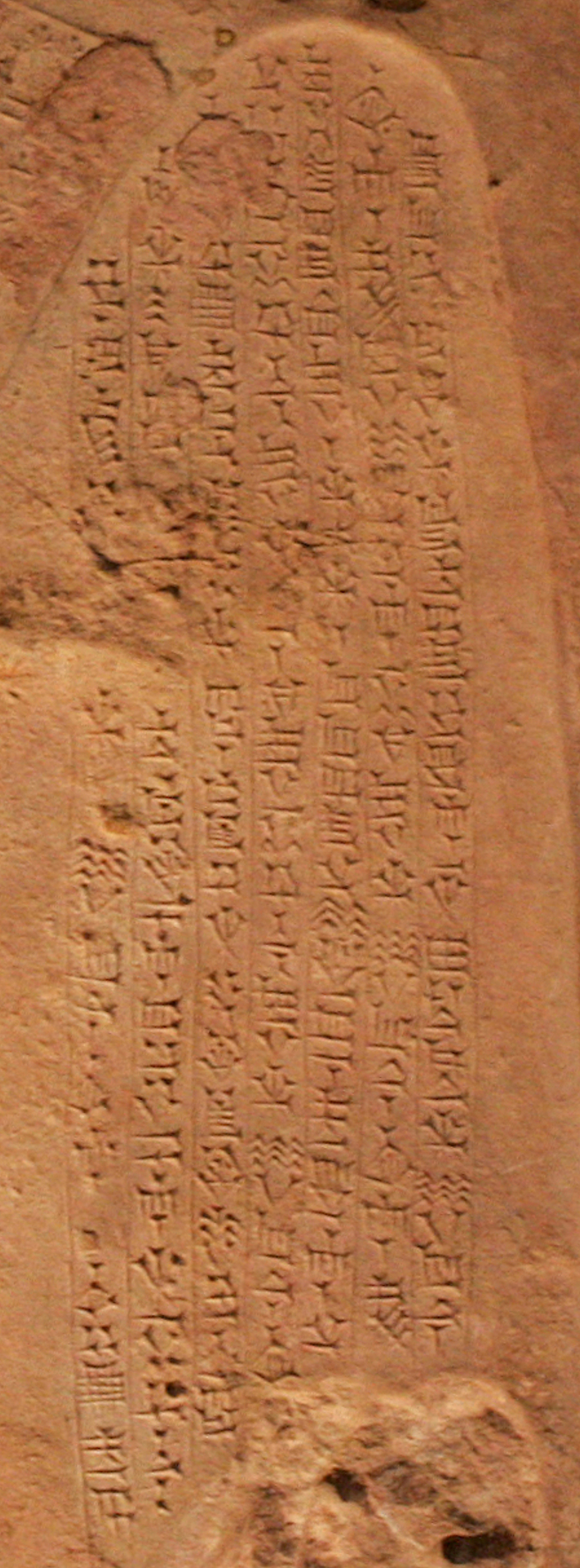
- Inscription of Shutruk-Nahhunte in Elamite cuneiform on the Victory Stele of Naram-Sin.
- Script type: Logogram
- Period: 2300 BCE to 400 BCE
- Languages: Elamite language

Related scripts
- Parent systems: Sumerian cuneiform: Akkadian cuneiform; Elamite cuneiform
- Sister systems: Old Persian cuneiform

Elamite cuneiform was a logo-syllabic script used to write the Elamite language. The corpus of Elamite cuneiform consists of tablets and fragments. The majority were created during the Achaemenid era, and contain primarily economic records.

== History and decipherment ==
The Elamite language (c. 2600 BCE to 400 BCE) is the now-extinct language spoken by Elamites, who inhabited the regions of Khūzistān and Fārs in Southern Iran. It has long been an enigma for scholars due to the scarcity of resources for its research and the irregularities found in the language. It seems to have no relation to its neighboring Semitic and Indo-European languages. Scholars fiercely argue over several hypotheses about its origin, but have no definite theory.

Elamite cuneiform comes in two variants: the first, derived from Akkadian, was used during the 3rd to 2nd millennia BCE, and a simplified form was used during the 1st millennium BCE. The main difference between the two variants is the reduction of glyphs used in the simplified version. At any one time, there would only be around 130 cuneiform signs in use. Throughout the script's history, only 206 different signs were used in total.

== Archaeological sources ==
=== First document in Elamite cuneiform (2250 BCE) ===
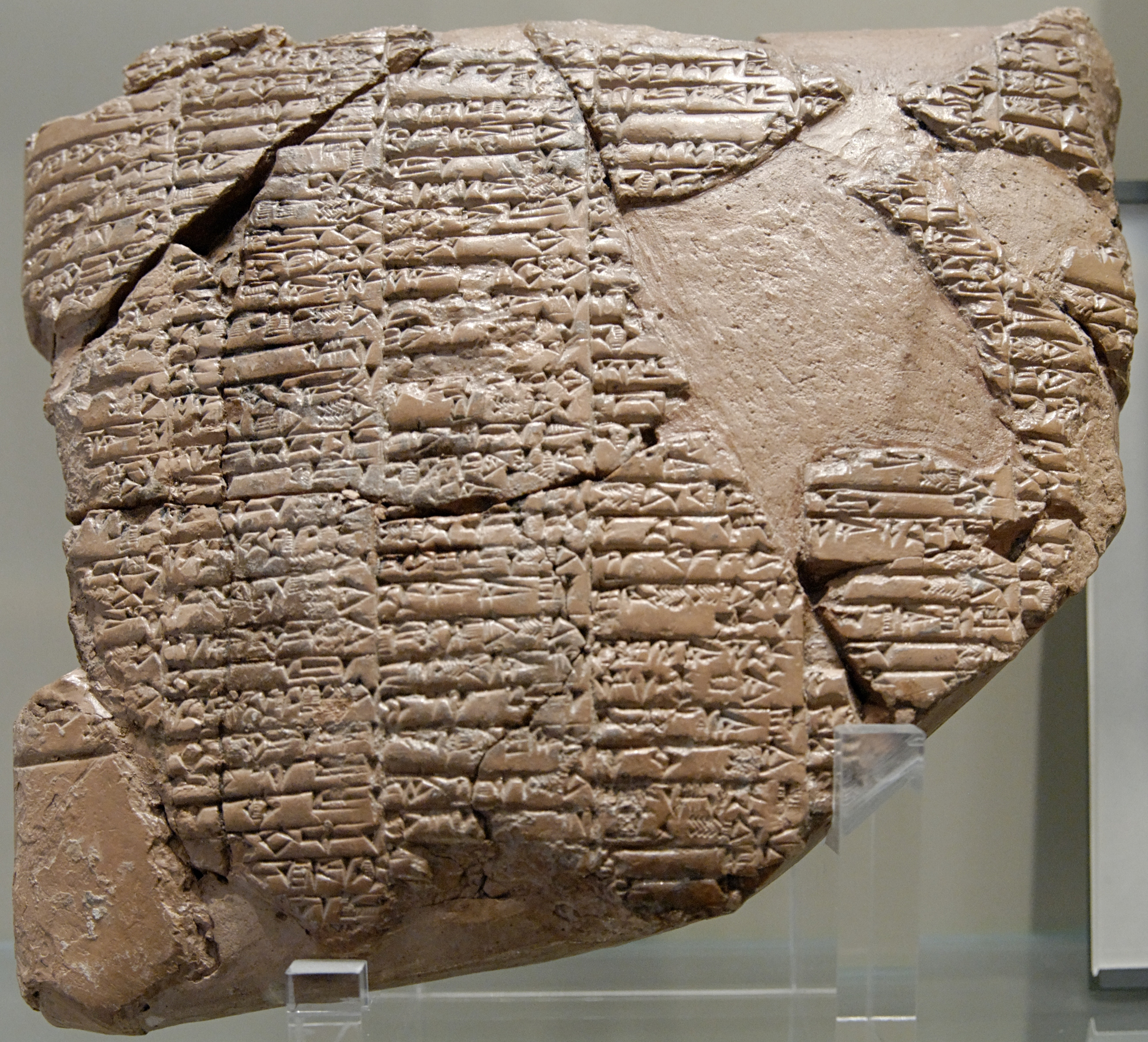
Probable treaty of alliance between Naram-Sin and Khita of Susa, king of Awan. Elamite cuneiforms, c. 2250, Susa, Louvre Museum.

The earliest text using Elamite cuneiform, an adaptation of Akkadian cuneiform, is a treaty between the Akkadian Naram-Sin and the Elamite Khita that dates back to 2250 BCE. The Treaty enumerates the kings of Elam, as guarantors of the agreement, and states:

The enemy of Naram-Sin is my enemy, the friend of Naram-Sin is my friend

— Akkadian-Elamite Treaty of 2250 BCE

However, some believe that Elamite cuneiform might have been in use since 2500 BCE. The tablets are poorly preserved, so only limited parts can be read, but it is understood that the text is a treaty between the Akkad king Nāramsîn and Elamite ruler Hita, as indicated by frequent references like "Nāramsîn's friend is my friend, Nāramsîn's enemy is my enemy".

=== Persepolis Administrative Archives ===
In 1933–34, 33,000 Elamite cuneiform tablets were found as part of the Persepolis Administrative Archives. The Archives are the most important primary source for an understanding of the internal workings of the Achaemenid Empire.

=== Other Achaemenid inscriptions ===
The most famous Elamite writings and the ones that ultimately led to its decipherment are the ones found in the trilingual inscriptions of monuments commissioned by the Achaemenid Persian kings; the Achaemenid royal inscriptions. The inscriptions, like the Rosetta Stone's, were written in three different writing systems. The first was Old Persian, which was deciphered in 1802 by Georg Friedrich Grotefend. The second, Babylonian cuneiform, was deciphered shortly after the Old Persian text. Because Elamite is unlike its neighboring Semitic languages, the script's decipherment was delayed until the 1840s. Even today, lack of sources and comparative materials hinder further research of Elamite.

== Inventory ==
Elamite radically reduced the number of cuneiform glyphs. From the entire history of the script, only 206 glyphs are used; at any one time, the number was fairly constant at about 130. In the earliest tablets the script is almost entirely syllabic, with almost all common Old Akkadian syllabic glyphs with CV and VC values being adopted. Over time the number of syllabic glyphs is reduced while the number of logograms increases. About 40 CVC glyphs are also occasionally used, but they appear to have been used for the consonants and ignored the vocalic value. Several determinatives are also used.

Elamite CV and VC syllabic glyphs Monumental Achaemenid inscriptions, 5th century BCE
	Ca	Ce	Ci	Cu	aC	eC	iC	uC
p b	𒉺 pa 𒁀 ba	𒁁 be	𒉿 pe ~ pi	𒁍 pu	𒀊 ap	𒅁 ip (𒌈 íp)		𒌒 up
k g	𒋡 ka_{4}	𒆠 ke ~ ki 𒄀 ge ~ gi		𒆪 ku	𒀝 ak	𒅅 ik		𒊌 uk
t d	𒆪 da	𒋼 te	𒋾 ti	𒌅 tu, 𒌈 tu_{4} 𒁺 du	𒀜 at			𒌓 ut
š	𒐼 šá (𒊮 šà)	𒊺 še	𒅆 ši	𒋗 šu	𒀾 aš	𒆜 iš ~ uš		
s z (č)	𒊓 sa 𒍝 ca	𒋛 se ~ si 𒍢 ce ~ ci		𒋢 su	𒊍 as/ac	𒄑 is/ic		
y	𒅀 ya							
l	𒆷 la	𒇷 le ~ li		𒇻 lu				𒌌 ul
m	𒈠 ma	𒈨 me	𒈪 mi	𒈬 mu	𒄠 am			𒌝 um
n	𒈾 na	𒉌 ne ~ ni		𒉡 nu	𒀭 an	𒂗 en	𒅔 in	𒌦 un
r	𒊏 ra	𒊑 re ~ ri		𒊒 ru		𒅕 ir		𒌨 ur
h 0	𒄩 ha 𒀀 a	𒂊 e	𒄭 hi 𒄿 i	𒄷 hu 𒌋 u, 𒌑 ú	𒄴 ah			

Glyphs in parentheses in the table are not common.

The script distinguished the four vowels of Akkadian and 15 consonants, /p/, /b/, /k/, /g/, /t/, /d/, /š/, /s/, /z/, /y/, /l/, /m/, /n/, /r/, and /h/. The Akkadian voiced pairs /p, b/, /k, g/, and /t, d/ may not have been distinct in Elamite. The series transcribed z may have been an affricate such as /č/ or /c/ (ts). /hV/ was not always distinguished from simple vowels, suggesting that /h/ may have been dropping out of the language. The VC glyphs are often used for a syllable coda without any regard to the value of V, suggesting that they were in fact alphabetic C signs.

Much of the conflation of Ce and Ci, and also eC and iC, is inherited from Akkadian (pe-pi-bi, ke-ki, ge-gi, se-si, ze-zi, le-li, re-ri, and ḫe-ḫi—that is, only ne-ni are distinguished in Akkadian but not Elamite; of the VC syllables, only eš-iš-uš). In addition, 𒄴 is aḫ, eḫ, iḫ, uḫ in Akkadian, and so effectively is a coda consonant even there.

=== Sumerograms ===
Below is a partial list of Elamite Sumerograms.

BAN	𒌉
DILBAD	
DINGIR	𒀭
DUB	𒁾
GAL	𒃲
GESHTIN	𒃾
GUD	𒄞
GUL	𒄢
ITU	
ITU-tanna	
ITU-tinna	
KAM	𒄰
KU-BABBAR	𒆬𒌓
KU-GI	𒆬𒄀
KUSH	𒋢
KUSH-ukku	
LU	𒇽
LU-irra	
LUGAL	𒈗
LUGAL-appi-ni	
LUGAL-appi-ni-kut	
PAP	𒉽
QA	𒋡
SAG	𒊕
SAG-appi-ni	
SHE-BAR	𒊺𒁇
UDU-NITA	𒇻𒀴
UN	𒌦

== Syntax ==
Elamite cuneiform is similar to that of Akkadian cuneiform except for a few unusual features. For example, the primary function of CVC glyphs was to indicate the two consonants rather than the syllable. Thus certain words used the glyphs for "tir" and "tar" interchangeably and the vowel was ignored. Occasionally, the vowel is acknowledged such that "tir" will be used in the context "ti-rV". Thus "ti-ra" might be written with the glyphs for "tir" and "a" or "ti" and "ra".

Elamite cuneiform allows for a lot of freedom when constructing syllables. For example, CVC syllables are sometimes represented by using a CV and VC glyph. The vowel in the second glyph is irrelevant so "sa-ad" and "sa-ud" are equivalent. Additionally, "VCV" syllable sequences are represented by combining "V" and "CV" glyphs or "VC" and "CV" glyphs that have a common consonant. Thus "ap-pa" and "a-pa" are equivalent. This also happens in Sumerian and Akkadian.

== See also ==
- Proto-Elamite
- Linear Elamite
- Cuneiform (Unicode block)
