= Elamite language =

Extinct language of the ancient Elamites of Iran

Elamite
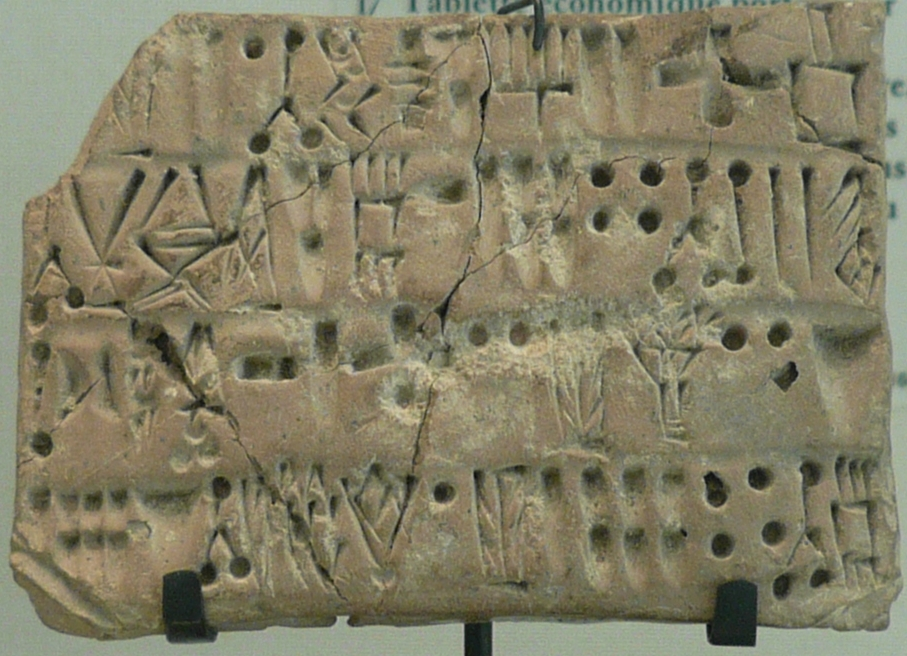
- Tablet in Proto-Elamite script
- Native to: Elam
- Region: Western Asia, Iran
- Era: c. 2800–300 BC (Later unwritten forms might have survived until AD 1000?)
- Language family: Language isolate
- Early form: language of Proto-Elamite?
- Writing system: Linear Elamite, Elamite cuneiform

Language codes
- ISO 639-2: elx
- ISO 639-3: elx
- Glottolog: elam1244

Elamite, also known as Hatamtite and formerly as Scythic, Median, Amardian, Anshanian and Susian, is an extinct language that was spoken by the ancient Elamites. It was recorded in what is now southwestern Iran from 2600 BC to AD 330. Elamite is generally thought to have no demonstrable relatives and is usually considered a language isolate. The lack of established relatives makes its interpretation difficult.

A sizeable number of Elamite lexemes are known from the Achaemenid royal inscriptions – trilingual inscriptions of the Achaemenid Empire, in which Elamite was written using Elamite cuneiform (circa 5th century BC), which is fully deciphered. An important dictionary of the Elamite language, the Elamisches Wörterbuch was published in 1987 by W. Hinz and H. Koch. The Linear Elamite script however, one of the scripts used to write the Elamite language c. 2000 BC, had remained elusive until the 2010s.

== History ==
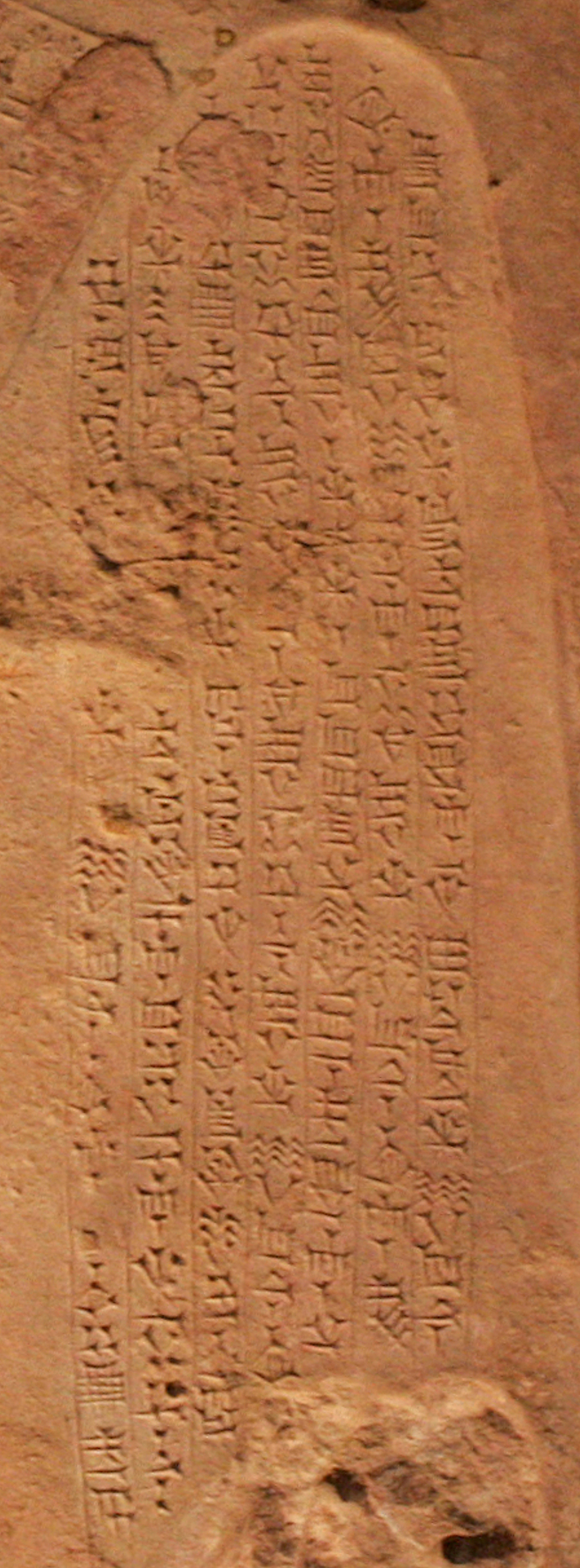
Inscription of Shutruk-Nahhunte in Elamite cuneiform, circa 1150 BC, on the Victory Stele of Naram-Sin.

The history of Elamite is periodised as follows:

- Old Elamite (c. 2600–1500 BC)
- Middle Elamite (c. 1500–1000 BC)
- Neo-Elamite (1000–550 BC)
- Achaemenid Elamite (550–330 BC)
- Late Elamite?
- Khuzi? (Unknown – AD 1000)

Middle Elamite is considered the "classical" period of Elamite. The best-attested variety is Achaemenid Elamite, which was widely used by the Achaemenid Empire for official inscriptions as well as administrative records and displays significant Old Persian influence.

Persepolis Administrative Archives were found at Persepolis in the 1930s, and they are mostly in Elamite; the remains of more than 10,000 of these cuneiform documents have been uncovered. In comparison, Aramaic is represented by only 1,000 or so original records. These documents represent administrative activity and data flow in Persepolis over more than fifty consecutive years (509 to 457 BC).

Documents from the Old Elamite and early Neo-Elamite stages are relatively scarce. Neo-Elamite is a transitional form in its structure between Middle and Achaemenid Elamite.

The Elamite language may have remained in widespread use after the Achaemenid period. Several rulers of Elymais bore the Elamite name Kamnaskires in the 2nd and 1st centuries BC. The Acts of the Apostles (c. AD 80–90) mentions the language as if it was still current. There are no later direct references, but Elamite may be the local language in which, according to the Talmud, the Book of Esther was recited annually to the Jews of Susa in the Sasanian Empire (224–642).

Between the 8th and 13th centuries AD, various Arabic authors refer to a language called Khūzī or Khūz spoken in Khuzistan, which was unlike any other language known to those writers. It is possible that it was "a late variant of Elamite". The last original report on the Khūz language was written circa 988 by al-Maqdisi, characterizing the Khuzi as bilingual in Arabic and Persian but also speaking an "incomprehensible" language in Ramhormoz. The city had recently become prosperous again after the foundation of a market when it received an influx of foreigners and being a Khuzi was stigmatized at the time. The language probably went extinct in the 11th century. Later authors only mention the language when citing previous work.

=== Study ===
The study of Elamite language goes back to the first publications of Achaemenid royal inscriptions in Europe in the first half of the 19th century AD. A great step forward was the publication of the Elamite version of the Bisutun Inscription in the name of Darius I, entrusted by Henry Rawlinson to Edwin Norris and appeared in 1855. At that time, Elamite was believed to be Scythian, whose Indo-European affiliation was not yet established. The first grammar was published by Jules Oppert in 1879. The first to use the glottonym Elamite is considered to be Archibald Henry Sayce in 1874, though already in 1850 Isidore Löwenstern advanced this identification. The publication of pre-Achaemenid inscriptions from Susa is due along the first three decades of the 20th century by father Vincent Scheil. Then in 1933 the Persepolis Fortification Tablets were discovered, being the first administrative corpus in this language, even if published by Richard T. Hallock much later (1969). Another administrative corpus was discovered in the 1970s at Tall-i Malyan, the ancient city of Anshan, and published in 1984 by Matthew W. Stolper. In the meantime (1967), the Middle Elamite inscriptions from Chogha Zanbil were published by father Marie-Joseph Steve. In the fourth quarter of the 20th century the French school was led by François Vallat, with relevant studies by Françoise Grillot(-Susini) and Florence Malbran-Labat, while the American school of scholars, inaugurated by George G. Cameron and Herbert H. Paper, focused on the administrative corpora with Stolper. Elamite studies have been revived in the 2000s by Wouter F.M. Henkelman with several contributions and a monograph focused on the Persepolis Fortification tablets. Elamite language is currently taught in three universities in Europe, by Henkelman at the École pratique des hautes études, Gian Pietro Basello at the University of Naples "L'Orientale" and Jan Tavernier at the UCLouvain.

== Classification ==
Elamite is regarded by the vast majority of linguists as a language isolate, as it has no demonstrable relationship to the neighbouring Semitic languages, Indo-European languages, or to Sumerian, despite having adopted the Sumerian-Akkadian cuneiform script.

An Elamo-Dravidian family connecting Elamite with the Brahui language of Pakistan and Dravidian languages of India was suggested in 1967 by Igor M. Diakonoff and later, in 1974, defended by David McAlpin and others. In 2012, Southworth proposed that Elamite forms the "Zagrosian family" along with Brahui and, further down the cladogram, the remaining Dravidian languages; this family would have originated in Southwest Asia (southern Iran) and was widely distributed in South Asia and parts of eastern West Asia before the Indo-Aryan migration. Recent discoveries regarding early population migration based on ancient DNA analysis have revived interest in the possible connection between proto-Elamite and proto-Dravidian. A detailed reassessment of the Elamo-Dravidian hypothesis by Pedron in 2023 reaffirmed the majority position that it was without good evidence, noting that the words and morphemes McAlpin identified as cognates tended either to not be proven to share a meaning or to be extremely simple syllables that could easily be chance resemblances, especially given the amount of time involved.

Václav Blažek proposed a relation with the Semitic languages.

In 2002 George Starostin published a lexicostatistic analysis finding Elamite to be approximately equidistant from Nostratic and Semitic.

None of these ideas have been accepted by mainstream historical linguists.

== Phonology ==
Because of the limitations of the language's scripts, its phonology is not well understood.

Its consonants included at least stops /p/, /t/ and /k/, sibilants /s/, /ʃ/ and /z/ (with an uncertain pronunciation), nasals /m/ and /n/, liquids /l/ and /r/ and fricative /h/, which was lost in late Neo-Elamite. Some peculiarities of the spelling have been interpreted as suggesting that there was a contrast between two series of stops (/p/, /t/, /k/ as opposed to /b/, /d/, /ɡ/), but in general, such a distinction was not consistently indicated by written Elamite.

Elamite had at least the vowels /a/, /i/, and /u/ and may also have had /e/, which was not generally expressed unambiguously.

Roots were generally CV, (C)VC, (C)VCV or, more rarely, CVCCV (the first C was usually a nasal).

=== Desset's reconstruction ===
Below is phonological system interpretation suggested by Desset.

==== Vowels ====
	Front	Back
Close	i	u
Mid	e	o
Open	a	

Probably there were also long vowels and diphthongs, though written occurrences are rare.

==== Consonants ====
Transcription is given in brackets ⟨⟩, while non-verified consonants are in parentheses ().

Consonant phonemes of Elamite
	Labial	Alveolar	Postalveolar	Velar
Nasal	m	n		
Plosive	p (b)	t (d)		k (g)
Affricate?		⟨z⟩^{1}		
Fricative		ɬ ⟨s⟩	ʃ ⟨š⟩	x ⟨h⟩^{2}
Approximant	w		(j)	
Rhotic		⟨r⟩		
Lateral		l		

1. Either ts or θ.
2. Described as velar fricative by Desset. Two identified ⟨h⟩ signs possibly expressed two different /h/ phonemes.

== Writing system ==
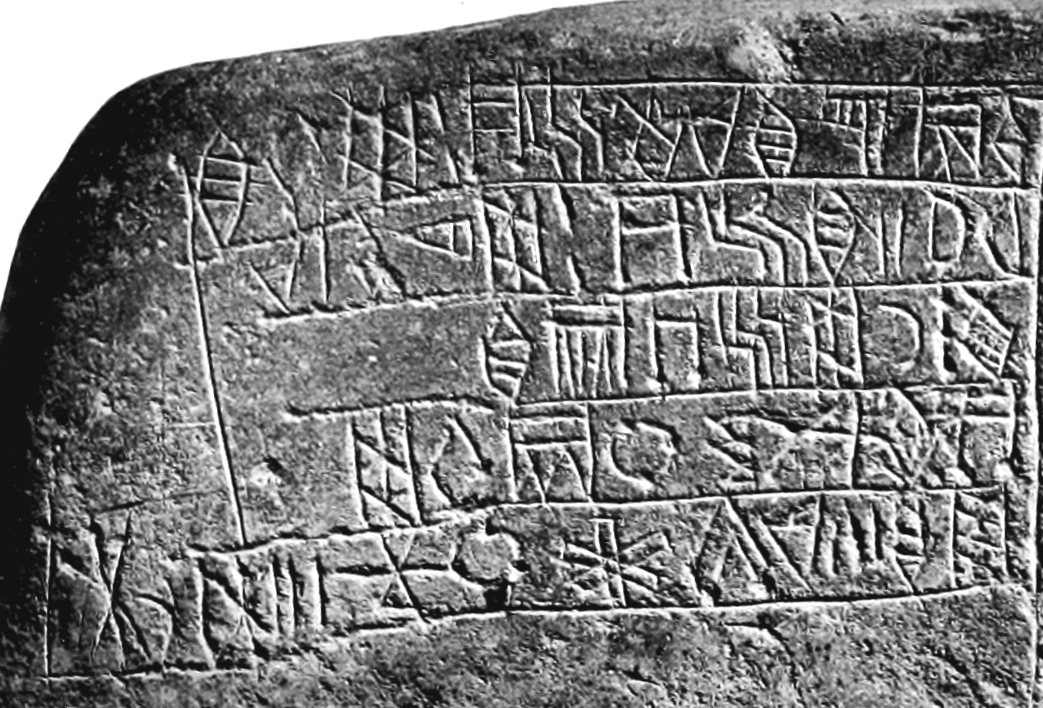
Linear Elamite inscription of king Puzur-Inshushinak, in the "Table du Lion", Louvre Museum Sb 17.

The following scripts are known or assumed to have encoded Elamite:

- Proto-Elamite script is the oldest known writing system from Iran. It was used during a brief period of time (c. 3100–2900 BC); clay tablets with Proto-Elamite writing have been found at different sites across Iran. It is thought to have developed from early cuneiform (proto-cuneiform) and consists of more than 1,000 signs. It is thought to be largely logographic and is not deciphered.
- Linear Elamite is attested in a few monumental inscriptions. It has been described either as a syllabic or logosyllabic writing system. At least part of the script has been deciphered and it has been argued to have developed from Proto-Elamite, although the exact nature of the relationship between the two is disputed (see the main article). Linear Elamite was used for a very brief period of time during the last quarter of the third millennium BC.

Later, Elamite cuneiform, adapted from Akkadian cuneiform, was used from c. 2500 BC on. Elamite cuneiform was largely a syllabary of some 130 glyphs at any one time and retained only a few logograms from Akkadian but, over time, the number of logograms increased. The complete corpus of Elamite cuneiform consists of about 20,000 tablets and fragments. The majority belong to the Achaemenid era, and contain primarily economic records.

== Typology ==
Elamite is an agglutinative language, and its grammar was characterized by an extensive and pervasive nominal class system. Animate nouns have separate markers for first, second and third person. It can be said to display a kind of Suffixaufnahme in that the nominal class markers of the head are also attached to any modifiers, including adjectives, noun adjuncts, possessor nouns and even entire clauses.

== Morphology ==
Though an agglutinative language, Elamite has fewer morphemes per word than, for example, Sumerian or Hurrian and Urartian. It is mostly suffixing.

=== Nouns ===
The Elamite nominal system is thoroughly pervaded by a noun class distinction, which combines a gender distinction between animate and inanimate with a personal class distinction, corresponding to the three persons of verbal inflection (first, second, third, plural).
The suffixes that express that system are as follows:
Animate:

1st person singular: -k
2nd person singular: -t
3rd person singular: -r or -Ø
3rd person plural: -p

Inanimate:

-∅, -me, -n, -t

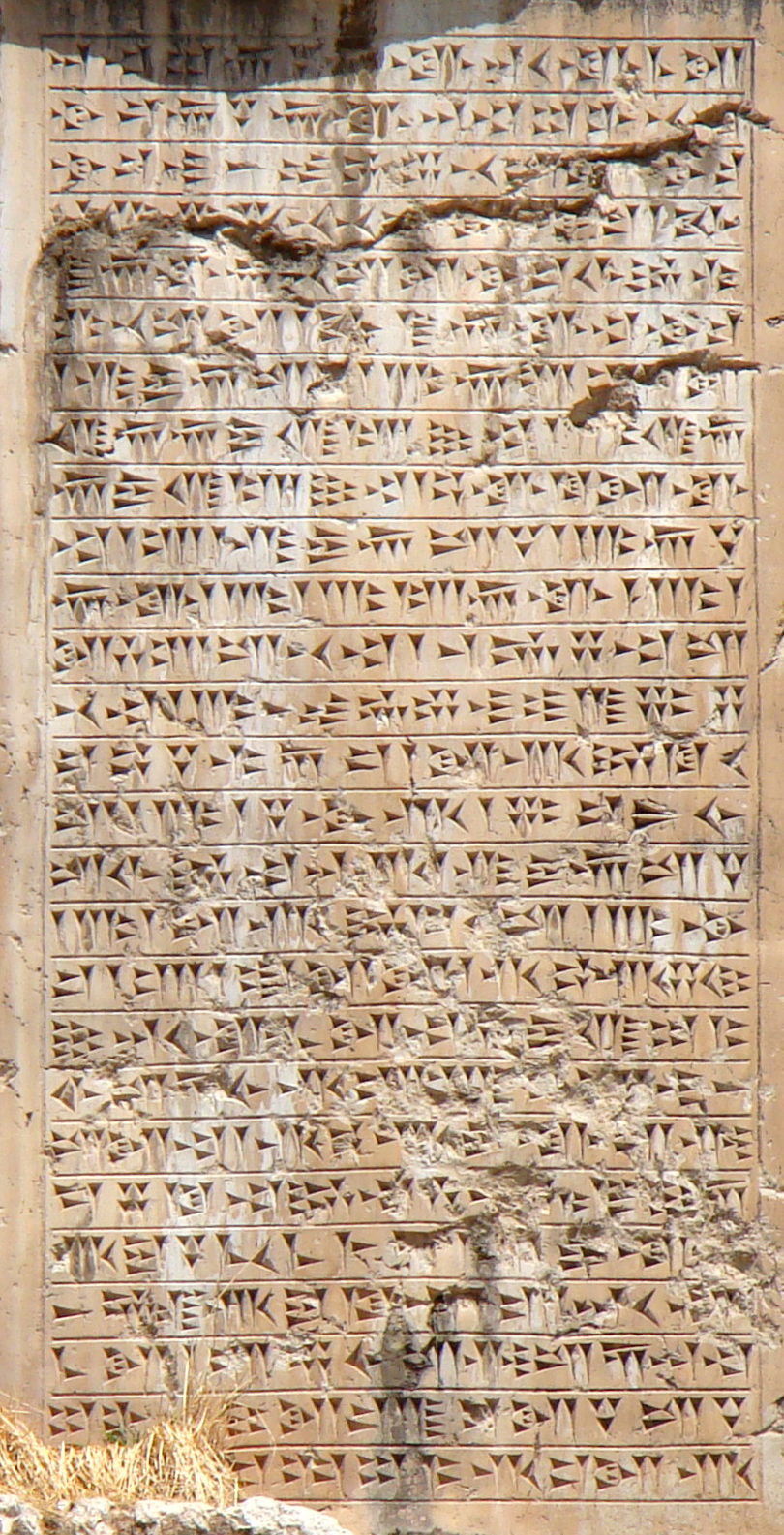
Inscription in Elamite, in the Xerxes I inscription at Van, 5th century BC

The animate third-person suffix -r can serve as a nominalizing suffix and indicate nomen agentis or just members of a class. The inanimate third-person singular suffix -me forms abstracts.

Some examples of the use of the noun class suffixes above are the following:

sunki-k "a king (first person)" i.e. "I, a king"

sunki-r "a king (third person)"

nap-Ø or nap-ir "a god (third person)"

sunki-p "kings"

nap-ip "gods"

sunki-me "kingdom, kingship"

hal-Ø "town, land"

siya-n "temple"

hala-t "mud brick".

Modifiers follow their (nominal) heads. In noun phrases and pronoun phrases, the suffixes referring to the head are appended to the modifier, regardless of whether the modifier is another noun (such as a possessor) or an adjective. Sometimes the suffix is preserved on the head as well:

u šak X-k(i) = "I, the son of X"

X šak Y-r(i) = "X, the son of Y"

u sunki-k Hatamti-k = "I, the king of Elam"

sunki Hatamti-p (or, sometimes, sunki-p Hatamti-p) = "the kings of Elam"

temti riša-r = "great lord" (lit. "lord great")

riša-r nap-ip-ir = "greatest of the gods" (lit. "great of the gods")

nap-ir u-ri = "my god" (lit. "god of me")

hiya-n nap-ir u-ri-me = "the throne hall of my god"

takki-me puhu nika-me-me = "the life of our children"

sunki-p uri-p u-p(e) = "kings, my predecessors" (lit. "kings, predecessors of me")

This system, in which the noun class suffixes function as derivational morphemes as well as agreement markers and indirectly as subordinating morphemes, is best seen in Middle Elamite. It was, to a great extent, broken down in Achaemenid Elamite, where possession and, sometimes, attributive relationships are uniformly expressed with the "genitive case" suffix -na appended to the modifier: e.g. šak X-na "son of X". The suffix -na, which probably originated from the inanimate agreement suffix -n followed by the nominalizing particle -a (see below), appeared already in Neo-Elamite.

The personal pronouns distinguish nominative and accusative case forms. They are as follows:

	Singular		Plural	
	Nominative	Accusative	Nominative	Accusative
1st person	u	un	nika/nuku	nukun
2nd person	ni/nu	nun	num/numi	numun
3rd person	i/hi	ir/in	ap/appi	appin
Inanimate	i/in			

In general, no special possessive pronouns are needed in view of the construction with the noun class suffixes. Nevertheless, a set of separate third-person animate possessives -e (sing.) / appi-e (plur.) is occasionally used already in Middle Elamite: puhu-e "her children", hiš-api-e "their name". The relative pronouns are akka "who" and appa "what, which".

=== Verbs ===
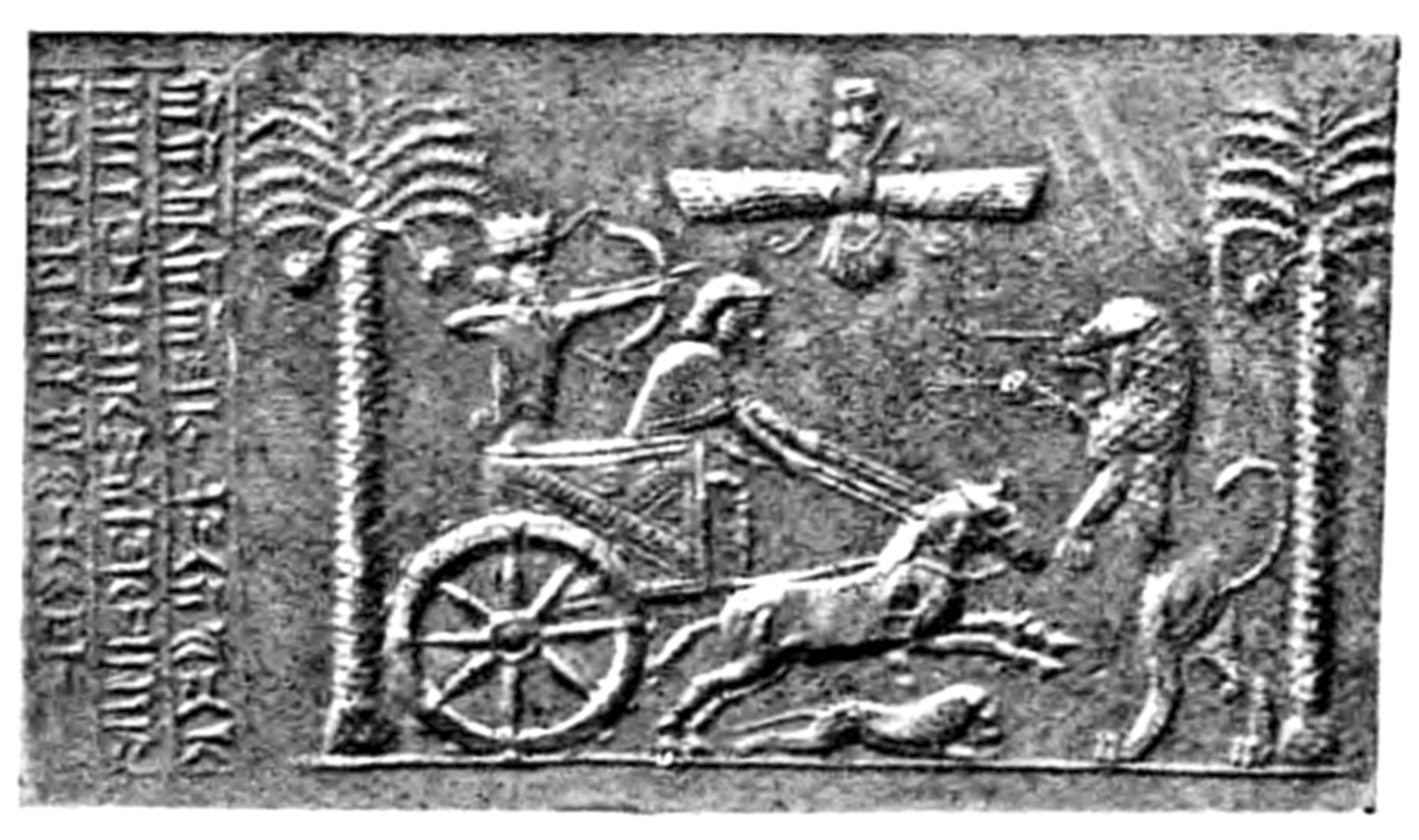
Seal of Darius the Great hunting in a chariot, reading "I am Darius, the Great King" in Old Persian (𐎠𐎭𐎶𐏐𐎭𐎠𐎼𐎹𐎺𐎢𐏁𐎴 𐏋, "adam Dārayavaʰuš xšāyaθiya"), as well as in Elamite and Babylonian. The word 'great' only appears in Babylonian. British Museum.

The verb base can be simple (ta- "put") or "reduplicated" (beti > bepti "rebel"). The pure verb base can function as a verbal noun, or "infinitive".

The verb distinguishes three forms functioning as finite verbs, known as "conjugations". Conjugation I is the only one with special endings characteristic of finite verbs as such, as shown below. Its use is mostly associated with active voice, transitivity (or verbs of motion), neutral aspect and past tense meaning. Conjugations II and III can be regarded as periphrastic constructions with participles; they are formed by the addition of the nominal personal class suffixes to a passive perfective participle in -k and to an active imperfective participle in -n, respectively. Accordingly, conjugation II expresses a perfective aspect, hence usually past tense, and an intransitive or passive voice, whereas conjugation III expresses an imperfective non-past action.

The Middle Elamite conjugation I is formed with the following suffixes:

Conjugation I
	singular	plural
1st person	-h	-hu
2nd person	-t	-h-t
3rd person	-š	-h-š

Examples: kulla-h "I prayed", hap-t "you heard", hutta-š "he did", kulla-hu "we prayed", hutta-h-t "you (plur.) did", hutta-h-š "they did".

In Achaemenid Elamite, the loss of the /h/ reduces the transparency of the Conjugation I endings and leads to the merger of the singular and plural except in the first person; in addition, the first-person plural changes from -hu to -ut.

The participles can be exemplified as follows: perfective participle hutta-k "done", kulla-k "something prayed", i.e. "a prayer"; imperfective participle hutta-n "doing" or "who will do", also serving as a non-past infinitive. The corresponding conjugations (conjugation II and III) are:

		perfective (= conj. II)	imperfective (= conj. III)
1st person	singular	hutta-k-k	hutta-n-k
2nd person	singular	hutta-k-t	hutta-n-t
3rd person	singular	hutta-k-r	hutta-n-r
3rd person	plural	hutta-k-p	hutta-n-p

In Achaemenid Elamite, the Conjugation 2 endings are somewhat changed:

Conjugation II
1st person	singular	hutta-k-ut
2nd person	singular	hutta-k-t
3rd person	singular	hutta-k (hardly ever attested in predicative use)
3rd person	plural	hutta-p

There is also a periphrastic construction with an auxiliary verb ma- following either Conjugation II and III stems (i.e. the perfective and imperfective participles), or nomina agentis in -r, or a verb base directly. In Achaemenid Elamite, only the third option exists. There is no consensus on the exact meaning of the periphrastic forms with ma-, but durative, intensive or volitional interpretations have been suggested.

The optative is expressed by the addition of the suffix -ni to Conjugations I and II.

The imperative is identical to the second person of Conjugation I in Middle Elamite. In Achaemenid Elamite, it is the third person that coincides with the imperative.

The prohibitative is formed by the particle anu/ani preceding Conjugation III.

Verbal forms can be converted into the heads of subordinate clauses through the addition of the nominalising suffix -a, much as in Sumerian: siyan in-me kuši-hš(i)-me-a "the temple which they did not build". -ti/-ta can be suffixed to verbs, chiefly of conjugation I, expressing possibly a meaning of anteriority (perfect and pluperfect tense).

The negative particle is in-; it takes nominal class suffixes that agree with the subject of attention (which may or may not coincide with the grammatical subject): first-person singular in-ki, third-person singular animate in-ri, third-person singular inanimate in-ni/in-me. In Achaemenid Elamite, the inanimate form in-ni has been generalized to all persons, and concord has been lost.

== Syntax ==
Nominal heads are normally followed by their modifiers, but there are occasional inversions. Word order is subject–object–verb (SOV), with indirect objects preceding direct objects, but it becomes more flexible in Achaemenid Elamite. There are often resumptive pronouns before the verb – often long sequences, especially in Middle Elamite (ap u in duni-h "to-them I it gave").

The language uses postpositions such as -ma "in" and -na "of", but spatial and temporal relationships are generally expressed in Middle Elamite by means of "directional words" originating as nouns or verbs. They can precede or follow the governed nouns and tend to exhibit noun class agreement with whatever noun is described by the prepositional phrase: i-r pat-r u-r ta-t-ni "may you place him under me", lit. "him inferior of-me place-you-may". In Achaemenid Elamite, postpositions become more common and partly displace that type of construction.

A common conjunction is ak "and, or". Achaemenid Elamite also uses a number of subordinating conjunctions such as anka "if, when" and sap "as, when". Subordinate clauses usually precede the verb of the main clause. In Middle Elamite, the most common way to construct a relative clause is to attach a nominal class suffix to the clause-final verb, optionally followed by the relativizing suffix -a: thus, lika-me i-r hani-š-r(i) "whose reign he loves", or optionally lika-me i-r hani-š-r-a. The alternative construction by means of the relative pronouns akka "who" and appa "which" is uncommon in Middle Elamite, but gradually becomes dominant at the expense of the nominal class suffix construction in Achaemenid Elamite.

== Sample texts ==
Middle Elamite (Šutruk-Nahhunte I, 1200–1160 BC; EKI 18, IRS 33):

Transliteration:

(1) ú ^{DIŠ}šu-ut-ru-uk-^{d}nah-hu-un-te ša-ak ^{DIŠ}hal-lu-du-uš-^{d}in-šu-ši-

(2) -na-ak-gi-ik su-un-ki-ik an-za-an šu-šu-un-ka_{4} e-ri-en-

(3) -tu_{4}-um ti-pu-uh a-ak hi-ya-an ^{d}in-šu-ši-na-ak na-pír

(4) ú-ri-me a-ha-an ha-li-ih-ma hu-ut-tak ha-li-ku-me

(5) ^{d}in-šu-ši-na-ak na-pír ú-ri in li-na te-la-ak-ni

Transcription:

U Šutruk-Nahhunte, šak Halluduš-Inšušinak-(i)k, sunki-k Anzan Šušun-k(a). Erientum tipu-h ak hiya-n Inšušinak nap-(i)r u-r(i)-me ahan hali-h-ma. hutta-k hali-k u-me Inšušinak nap-(i)r u-r(i) in lina tela-k-ni.

Translation:

I, Šutruk-Nahhunte, son of Halluduš-Inšušinak, king of Anshan and Susa. I moulded bricks and made the throne hall of my god Inšušinak with them. May my work come as an offering to my god Inšušinak.

Achaemenid Elamite (Xerxes I, 486–465 BC; XPa):

Transliteration:

(01) [sect 01] ^{d}na-ap ir-šá-ir-ra ^{d}u-ra-mas-da ak-ka_{4} ^{AŠ}mu-ru-un

(02) hi pè-iš-tá ak-ka_{4} ^{d}ki-ik hu-ip-pè pè-iš-tá ak-ka_{4} ^{DIŠ}

(03) LÚ.MEŠ-ir-ra ir pè-iš-tá ak-ka_{4} ši-ia-ti-iš pè-iš-tá ^{DIŠ}

(04) LÚ.MEŠ-ra-na ak-ka_{4} ^{DIŠ}ik-še-ir-iš-šá ^{DIŠ}EŠŠANA ir hu-ut-taš-

(05) tá ki-ir ir-še-ki-ip-in-na ^{DIŠ}EŠŠANA ki-ir ir-še-ki-ip-

(06) in-na pír-ra-ma-ut-tá-ra-na-um

Transcription:

Nap irša-r(a) Auramasda, akka muru-n hi pe-š-ta, akka kik hupe pe-š-ta, akka ruh-(i)r(a) ir pe-š-ta, akka šiatiš pe-š-ta ruh-r(a)-na, akka Ikšerša sunki ir hutta-š-ta kir iršeki-p-na sunki, kir iršeki-p-na piramataram.

Translation:

A great god is Ahura Mazda, who created this earth, who created that sky, who created man, who created happiness of man, who made Xerxes king, one king of many, one lord of many.

== See also ==
- Proto-Elamite
- Linear Elamite
- Susa
- Anshan
- Achaemenid royal inscriptions
- Persepolis Fortification Tablets

== Bibliography ==
=== Introductions and overviews ===
- Álvarez-Mon, Javier; Basello, Gian Pietro; Wicks, Jasmina, eds. (2018). The Elamite World. London/New York: Routledge. ISBN 9781315658032.
- van Bladel, Kevin (2021). "The Language Of The Xūz And The Fate Of Elamite". Journal of the Royal Asiatic Society. 31 (3): 447–462. doi:10.1017/S1356186321000092.
- Blench, Roger; Spriggs, Matthew, eds. (1997). Theoretical and Methodological Orientations. Archaeology and Language. Vol. 1. London: Routledge. ISBN 9780415117609.
- Gragg, Gene B. (2009). "Elamite". In Brown, Edward Keith; Ogilvie, Sarah (eds.). Concise encyclopedia of languages of the world. Amsterdam/Oxford: Elsevier. pp. 316–317. ISBN 978-0-08-087774-7.
- Gnanadesikan, Amalia Elisabeth (2009). The writing revolution: cuneiform to the internet. Oxford: Wiley-Blackwell. ISBN 978-1-405-15406-2.
- Potts, Daniel T. (1999). The archaeology of Elam: formation and transformation of an ancient Iranian state. Cambridge: Cambridge University Press. ISBN 9780511489617..
- Basello, Gian Pietro (2011). "Elamite as Administrative Language: From Susa to Persepolis". In Álvarez-Mon, Javier; Garrison, Mark B. (eds.). Elam and Persia. University Park: Penn State University Press. pp. 61–88. doi:10.1515/9781575066127-008. ISBN 9781575066127. JSTOR 10.5325/j.ctv18r6qxh.

=== Dictionaries ===
- Hinz, Walther; Koch, Heidemarie (1987a). Elamisches Wörterbuch (in German). Vol. 1. Berlin: Reimer. ISBN 3-496-00923-3.
- Hinz, Walther; Koch, Heidemarie (1987b). Elamisches Wörterbuch (in German). Vol. 2. Berlin: Reimer. ISBN 3-496-00923-3.

=== Grammars ===
- Дьяконов, Игорь Михайлович (1967). Языки древней Передней Азии [The Languages of Ancient Asia Minor] (in Russian). Moskow: Наука.
- Khačikjan, Margaret (1998). The Elamite Language. Documenta Asiana. Vol. IV. Rome: Consiglio Nazionale delle Ricerche Istituto per gli Studi Micenei ed Egeo-Anatolici. ISBN 88-87345-01-5.
- Paper, Herbert H. (1955). The phonology and morphology of Royal Achaemenid Elamite. Ann Arbor: University of Michigan Press. LCCN 55-10983.
- Stolper, Matthew W. (2004). "Elamite". In Woodard, Roger D. (ed.). The Cambridge Encyclopedia of the World's Ancient Languages. Cambridge: Cambridge University Press. pp. 60–95. ISBN 978-0-521-56256-0.
  - Republished in Woodard, Roger D., ed. (2008). The Ancient Languages of Mesopotamia, Egypt, and Aksum. Cambridge: Cambridge University Press. pp. 60–95. ISBN 9780521684972.
- Tavernier, Jan (2020). "Elamite". In Hasselbach-Andee, Rebecca (ed.). A companion to ancient Near Eastern languages. Hoboken: Wiley Blackwell. pp. 163–184. ISBN 9781119193296.
- Basello, Gian Pietro (2023). "An Introduction to Elamite Language". In Basello, Gian Pietro (ed.). Studies on Elamite & Mesopotamian Cuneiform Culture (PDF). Durham, NC: Lulu. pp. 7–47. ISBN 978-1-4476-3979-4.

=== Genetic affiliation ===
- Blench, Roger (2006). Archaeology, Language, and the African Past. African Archaeology Series. Lanham: Rowman AltaMira. ISBN 978-0-7591-0466-2. ISSN 2691-8773.
- Joseph, Tony (2017). Early Indians : the story of our ancestors and where we came from. New Delh: Juggernaut. ISBN 978-93-86228-98-7. OCLC 1112882321.
- Krishnamurti, Bhadriraju (2003). The Dravidian Languages. Cambridge, United Kingdom: Cambridge University Press. ISBN 9781139435338.
- McAlpin, David W. (1974). "Toward Proto-Elamo-Dravidian". Language. 50 (1): 89–101. doi:10.2307/412012. JSTOR 412012.
- McAlpin, David W. (1975). "Elamite and Dravidian, Further Evidence of Relationships". Current Anthropology. 16 (1). doi:10.1086/201521.
- McAlpin, David W. (1979). "Linguistic prehistory: the Dravidian situation". In Deshpande, Madhav M.; Hook, Peter Edwin (eds.). Aryan and Non-Aryan in India. Ann Arbor: University of Michigan Press. pp. 175–190. doi:10.3998/mpub.19419. ISBN 978-0-472-90168-5. JSTOR 10.3998/mpub.19419.10.
- McAlpin, David W. (1981). "Proto-Elamo-Dravidian: The Evidence and Its Implications". Transactions of the American Philosophical Society. 71 (3): 1–155. doi:10.2307/1006352. JSTOR 1006352.
- Pedron, Filippo (2023). Elamite and Dravidian: A Reassessment. Thiruvananthapuram, India: International School of Dravidian Linguistics. ISBN 9788196007546.
- Southworth, Franklin (2011). "Rice in Dravidian and its linguistic implications". Rice. 4 (3–4): 142–148. Bibcode:2011Rice....4..142S. doi:10.1007/s12284-011-9076-9.
- Starostin, George (2002). "On the genetic affiliation of the Elamite language". Mother Tongue. VII: 147–217. ISSN 1087-0326.
- Zvelebil, Kamil V. (1985). "Review of Proto-Elamo-Dravidian: The Evidence and Its Implications". Journal of the American Oriental Society. 105 (2): 364–372. doi:10.2307/601741. ISSN 0003-0279. JSTOR 601741.
