= Pamela Hallock =

American marine biologist

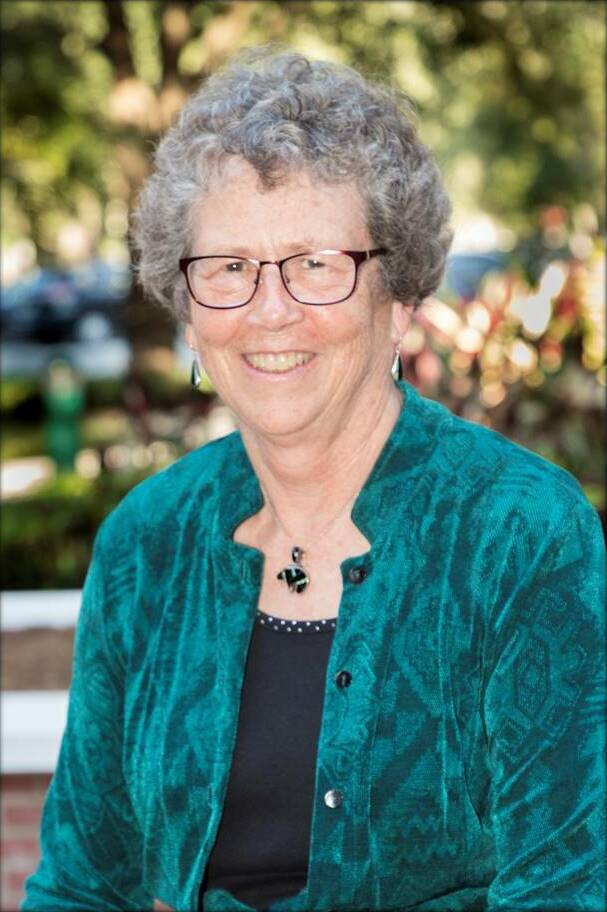
- Pamela Hallock (2018)
- Born: Pamela Mary Hallock; June 2, 1948 (age 78); Pierre, South Dakota, U.S.
- Education: University of Montana; University of Hawaii
- Scientific career
- Fields: Oceanography
- Workplaces: University of South Florida

Pamela Hallock Muller is a scientist, oceanographer and professor at the University of South Florida in the College of Marine Science.

== Overview ==
Hallock Muller's research has focused on reef-associated Foraminifera and algal symbiosis, extending into coral-reef ecology, paleobiology and carbonate sedimentology.

She has worked as a diversity and inclusion advocate who has promoted gender equality within academia and marine science.

== Early years and education ==
Hallock Muller was born in 1948 on a small ranch on the Rosebud Reservation in south-central South Dakota, Pamela Hallock attended elementary school in a one-room schoolhouse and started high school in Mission before her family moved to Missoula, Montana in 1963, where she completed high school.

She received her Bachelor's degree in zoology from the University of Montana, Missoula in 1969, and married a fellow zoology major, Robert Muller, in summer 1969. She received her Master's and Ph.D. degrees in oceanography from the University of Hawaii in 1972 and 1977.

She has spoken on the discrimination that she faced as a young woman in academia.

== Early career ==
Pamela Hallock Muller started as an assistant professor at the University of Texas of the Permian Basin in Odessa, TX, in 1978. She then moved to the University of South Florida as an associate professor in 1983 where she became a full professor in 1988.

== Research ==
Hallock Muller uses field studies to understand the role of nutrients, light and ocean chemistry in coral reefs, carbonate sedimentology and paleoceanography. She has studied algal symbiosis in the context of carbonate production, community structure and evolution of coral reefs.

A key aspect of her research is the study of reef-associated Foraminifera, including distributions, population dynamics and functional morphologies, with applications in studies of environmental quality, paleoenvironments, carbonate sedimentation, and global environmental change. Dr. Muller and her students are steadily working in aquatic environments, using bioindicator technology to aid in identifying the global warming effects on coral reefs in the Florida Keys area.

Her 1986 paper in PALAIOS with colleague Wolfgang Schlager-”Nutrient excess in the demise of coral reefs and carbonate platforms”-was named one the “Landmark Papers in Carbonate Sedimentology and Stratigraphy” by the American Association of Petroleum Geologists 100th Anniversary Committee in 2017.

She participated in a 10-day saturation mission in the NOAA-National Undersea Research Center's Aquarius Habitat in 1994. She also participated in the International Ocean Discovery Program's Leg 194 in 2001.

== Awards and honors ==
- 1999 Association for Women Geoscientists Outstanding Educator Award
- 2012 Alfred P. Sloan Foundation Minority Ph.D. Program's Mentor of the Year
- 2012 Elected Fellow, The Paleontological Society
- 2013 Named one of the Top 25 women professors in Florida in 2013.
- 2014 USF graduate-mentor award
- 2015 Joseph A. Cushman Award for Excellence in Foraminiferal Research
- 2016 USF graduate-mentor award.
- 2017 Who's Who Lifetime Achievement - Education, Science
- 2018 Hallock & Schlager (1986) named one of ten “Landmark Papers in Carbonate Sedimentology and Stratigraphy” by the American Association of Petroleum Geologists
- 2019 Raymond C. Moore Medal for Excellence in Paleontological Research, Society for Sedimentary Geology
- 2021 Elizabeth Hurlock Beckman Award, American Psychological Association

== Selected publications ==
- Hallock, P. 1985. Why are larger foraminifera large? Paleobiology 11:195-208
- Hallock, P. and W. Schlager. 1986. Nutrient excess and the demise of coral reefs and carbonate platforms. Palaios 1:389–398
- Hallock, P. and E. C. Glenn. 1986. Larger foraminifera: a tool for paleoenvironmental analysis of Cenozoic carbonate facies. Palaios 1:55–64
- Hallock, P. 1987. Fluctuations in the trophic resource continuum: a factor in global diversity cycles? Paleoceanography 2:457-471
- Hallock, P. 1988. The role of nutrient availability in bioerosion: consequences to carbonate buildups. Palaeogeography, Palaeoclimatology, Palaeoecology 63:275–291
- Cockey, E.M., P. Hallock, and B. Lidz. 1996. Decadal scale changes in benthic foraminiferal assemblages off Key Largo, Florida. Coral Reefs 15:237–248
- Hallock, P. 2000. Symbiont-bearing foraminifera: harbingers of global change. Micropaleontology 46(Suppl. 1): 95-104
- Hallock, P., Lidz, B.H., Cockey-Burkhard, E.M., and Donnelly, K.B. 2003. Foraminifera as bioindicators in coral reef assessment and monitoring: The FORAM Index. Environmental Monitoring and Assessment 81: 221-238
- Pomar, L., P. Hallock. 2008. Carbonate factories: A conundrum in sedimentary geology. Earth Science Reviews 87: 134-169
- Ross, B.J., Hallock, P. 2016. Dormancy in the Foraminifera: A review. Journal of Foraminiferal Research 46: 358-368

== Other interests ==
When not working, Dr Hallock Muller enjoys scuba diving, kayaking, and traveling. She also volunteers as a member of ARCS Tampa Bay since 2011, a science judge for the Spoonbill Regional National Ocean Sciences Bowl, a judge for local, regional, and state science fairs in Florida, and with the Pinellas Coastal Cleanup.
