= Franklin Southworth =

American linguist (1929–2025)

Franklin C. Southworth
- Born: June 28, 1929; Framingham, Massachusetts, U.S.
- Died: September 16, 2025 (aged 96)
- Occupation: Linguist

Academic work
- Institutions: University of Pennsylvania
- Main interests: Dravidian languages

Franklin Chester Southworth III (June 28, 1929 – September 16, 2025) was an American linguist and professor of South Asian linguistics at the University of Pennsylvania.

Southworth was born in Framingham, Massachusetts, on June 28, 1929, and died on September 16, 2025, at the age of 96.

== Publications ==
- "South Asia: Dravidian linguistic history" in The Encyclopedia of Global Human Migration (2013)
- Rice in Dravidian (2011)
- Proto-Dravidian Agriculture
- Linguistic archaeology of South Asia (2005)
- Prehistoric implications of the Dravidian element in the NIA lexicon, with special reference to Marathi (2005)
- Reconstructing social context from language: Indo-Aryan and Dravidian prehistory (1995)
- South Asian emblematic gestures (1992)
- The reconstruction of prehistoric South Asian language contact (1990)
- Linguistic archaeology and the Indus Valley culture (1989)
- Ancient economic plants of South Asia: linguistic archaeology and early agriculture (1988)
- The social context of language standardization (1985)
- Dravidian and Indo-European: the neglected relationship (1982)
- Lexical evidence for early contacts between Indo-Aryan and Dravidian (1979)
