= Fort Halleck =

Fort Halleck may refer to a U. S. Army fort in the United States:

- Fort Halleck (Wyoming), 1862–1866, established in Idaho Territory to protect the Overland Trail.
- Fort Halleck (Nevada), 1879–1886. First established as Camp Halleck in 1867, to protect the California Trail and the construction of the Central Pacific Railroad. Present day town of Halleck, Elko County, Nevada.
