= Frank K. Hallock =

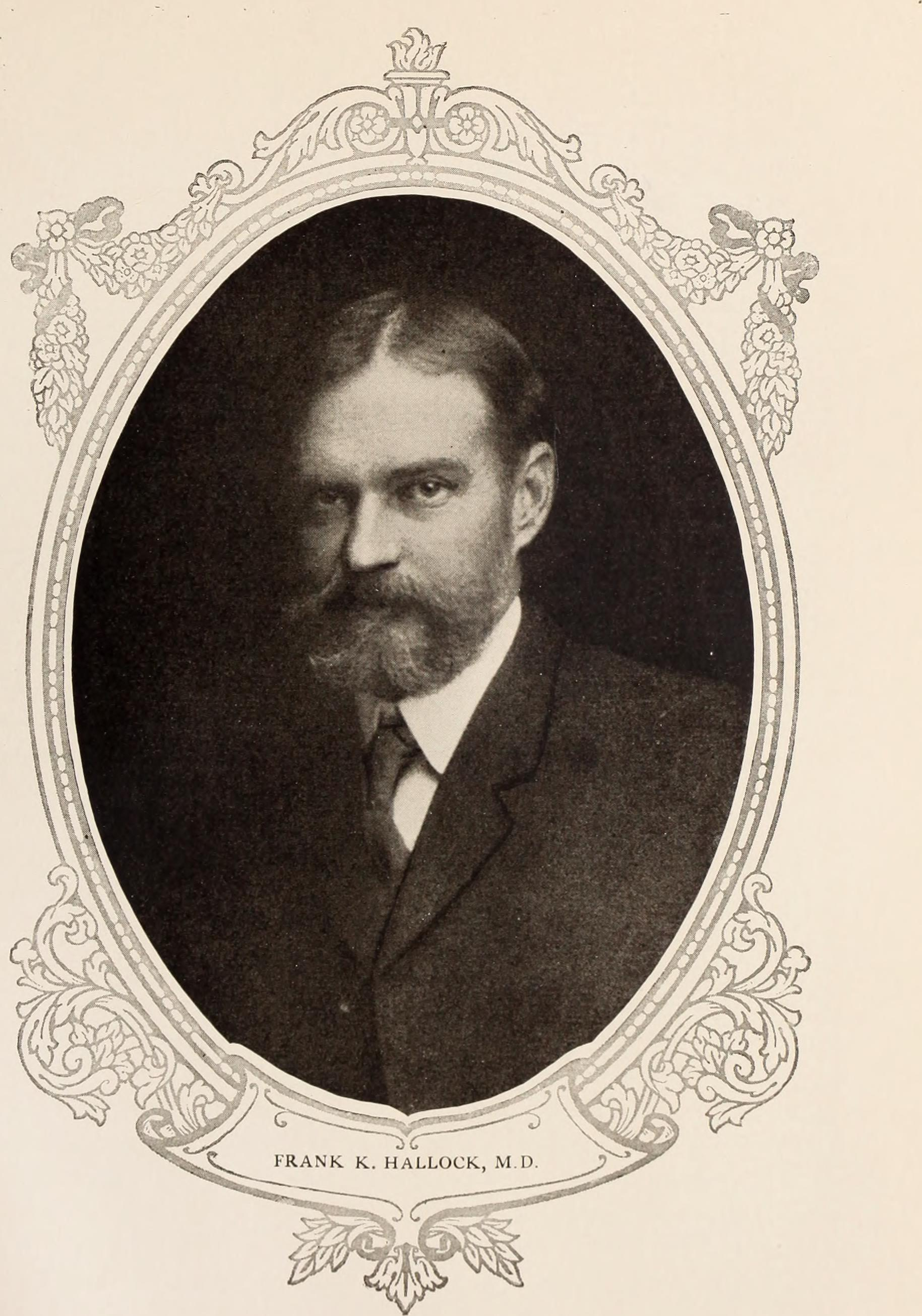
Frank K. Hallock, M.D.

Frank Kirkwood Hallock (August 18, 1860 – April 29, 1937) was an American medical doctor and book collector. He was born in Oyster Bay, Long Island, on August 18, 1860.

Hallock received a Bachelor of Arts in 1882 and a Master of Arts in 1885, both from Wesleyan University; and a MD from the College of Physicians at Wesleyan in 1885. He was a member of Phi Beta Kappa.

He studied neurology in Germany for two years. He was medical director at Cromwell Hall from 1890 until his death. He was also director and president of the Cromwell Savings Bank.

Hallock was a trustee of Wesleyan University from 1917 to 1937. He died in Cromwell, Connecticut on April 29, 1937.
