= Matthew Stolper =

American Assyriologist

Matthew Wolfgang Stolper is Professor of Assyriology and the John A. Wilson Professor of Oriental Studies in the Oriental Institute at the University of Chicago. He received a B.A. from Harvard in 1965, an M.A. from the University of Michigan in 1967, and a Ph.D. from the University of Michigan in 1974.

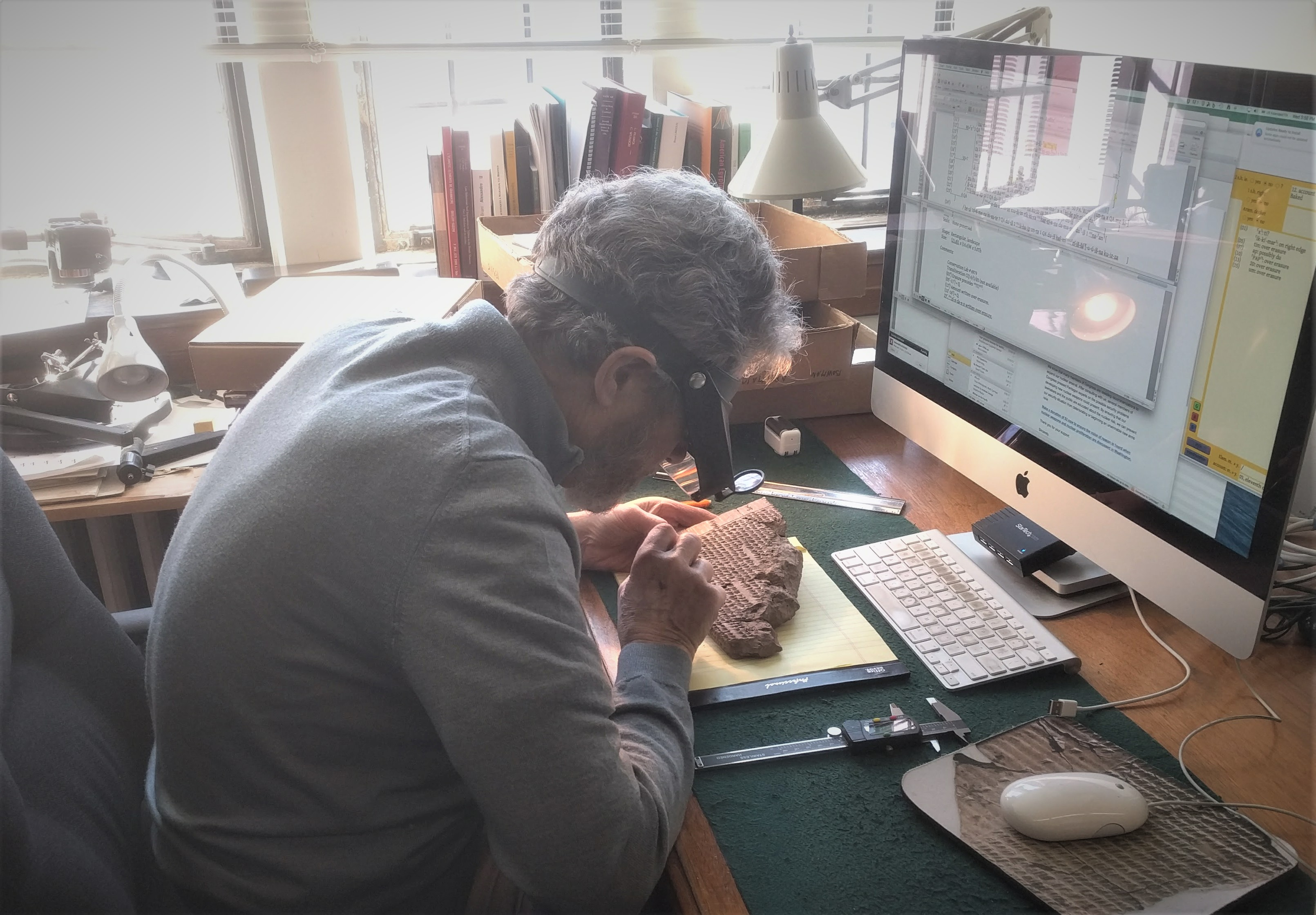
Stolper transliterating Persepolis Fortification tablets in his office at the Oriental Institute.

Professor Stolper's earlier interests centered on Babylonian legal texts, but his current work involves the Persepolis Fortification Project. He and a team of student employees are currently racing to document the Persepolis Fortification Archive, a collection of Achaemenid administrative records from Persepolis written mostly in Elamite (though a Greek and, surprisingly, an Old Persian tablet have been discovered).

His publications are numerous, including: The šaknu of Nippur, The Kasr Archive, Babylonian Evidence for the End of the Reign of Darius I: A Correction, A Note on Yahwistic Personal Names in the Murašû Texts, A Late-Achaemenid Lease from the Rich Collection, "Yet Another Iranian Loanword in Late Babylonian: Babyl. mašǎ̄ka < Ir. *važ̵ ā̆ka, Fifth Century Nippur: Texts of the Murašûs and from Their Surroundings, Some Ghost Facts from Achaemenid Babylonian Texts, The Governor of Babylon and Across-the-River in 486 B. C., Review: Iranians in Babylonia and A Paper Chase after the Aramaic on TCL 13 193.

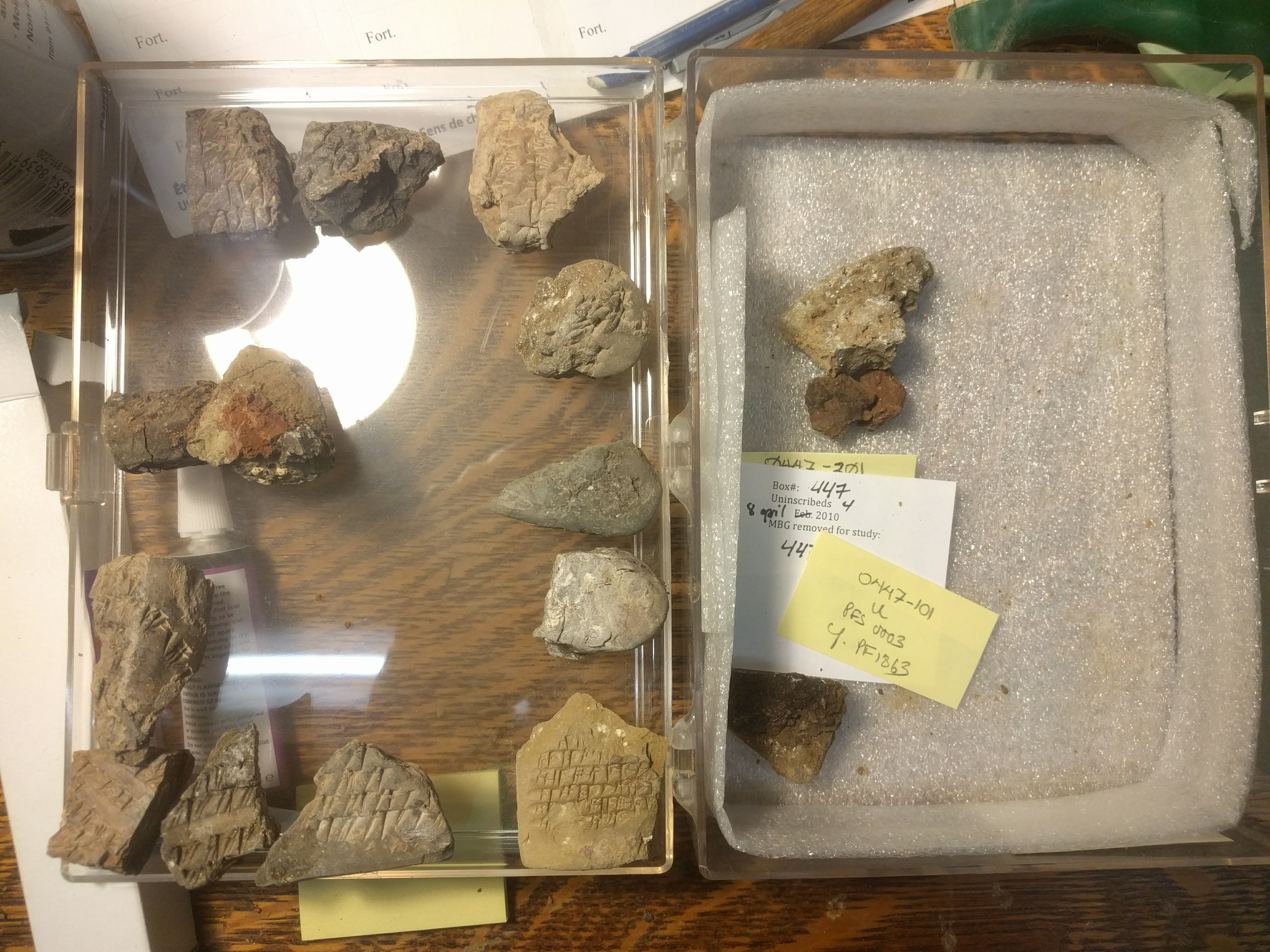
Persepolis Fortification Archive Tablets at the Oriental Institute

Among his publications on the Elamite language are: Texts from Tall-i Malyan, I: Elamite Administrative Texts (1972-1974), Elam: Surveys of Political History and Archaeology and Entrepreneurs and Empire: The Murašû Archive, the Murašû Firm, and Persian Rule in Babylonia.

In addition to doing important scholarly work, Stolper is also active in campus life at the University of Chicago. He recently argued for hamantash in the Great Latke-Hamantash Debate, an annual university tradition. Hamantash traditionally loses this debate, and Stolper's valiant efforts resulted in no change, despite the fact that he showed adorable pictures of his dog and constant companion, Baxter.

Stolper also has a healthy mythology surrounding him at the Oriental Institute. He is widely credited with the invention of "Stolper's Law", which stipulates that, when translating Akkadian, an unknown adjective is likely to mean "pure", and an unknown verb probably means "destroy".

Revolutionary teaching methods have also been attributed to Stolper, who refers to himself as the "Stolperstein", or stumbling block. A reference to this teaching method can be found on the forthcoming Latke-Hamantash debate DVD, as the moderator cited it before Professor Stolper's speech.

Stolper is also renowned for his quips concerning the Akkadian language. As one of his students fondly recalls in an entry entitled "Akkadian is so easy", he told his class:

"It takes only a couple of years to learn all the Akkadian you need to pass a comprehensive exam. It takes much longer to get a degree in French Lit, so obviously Akkadian is easier than French. Those scribes had pretty short life spans, so it must not take too long to get good at Akkadian. Reading a newspaper in English is 100 times more complex than reading a cuneiform tablet."

There are similar accounts concerning Old Persian:

"For a modern student, to learn the Old Persian script is a work of scarcely an hour. For a literate ancient speaker of the language, for whom the ambiguities left by the orthographic rules were not an obstacle, it would have been a work of minutes."

Much like Schrödinger's cat, the Persepolis Fortification Team has discussed the possibility of writing a book entitled Stolper's Dog: The Secret Wisdom of the Elamites. It would include such pithy sayings as:

“No-one has exact information except for you.”- A communication between Babylon and Uruk in the first Achaemenid reigns.
