= Richard Hallock =

American historian (1906–1980)

Richard Treadwell Hallock (5 April 1906 in Passaic, New Jersey – 20 November 1980 in Chicago) was an American Assyriologist and Elamitologist. He reached his Ph.D. degree in Assyriology at the University of Chicago in 1935, and was editorial secretary of the Chicago Assyrian Dictionary (1955–1957). His major work is Persepolis Fortification Tablets (1969), the first edition and translation of the Persepolis Fortification Archive. In 1972, he was elected a corresponding fellow of the British Academy.

Hallock also played an instrumental role in the Venona project. While working on Soviet "Trade" traffic (so named because these messages dealt with Soviet trade issues), Hallock discovered that the Soviets were reusing pages of some of the one-time pads they relied upon to encrypt their messages. Hallock and his colleagues (including Genevieve Feinstein, Cecil Phillips, Frank Lewis, Frank Wanat, and Lucille Campbell) went on to break into a significant amount of trade traffic, recovering many one-time pad additive key tables in the process.
