= Linear script =

A linear script is a script that is produced through linear writing, such as the Latin script (as opposed to Braille, Morse code, semaphore, finger-spelling, etc.), or, more specifically,

- Linear A of Crete
- Linear B of Crete
- Linear Elamite
