= Narundi =

Elamite and Mesopotamian goddess

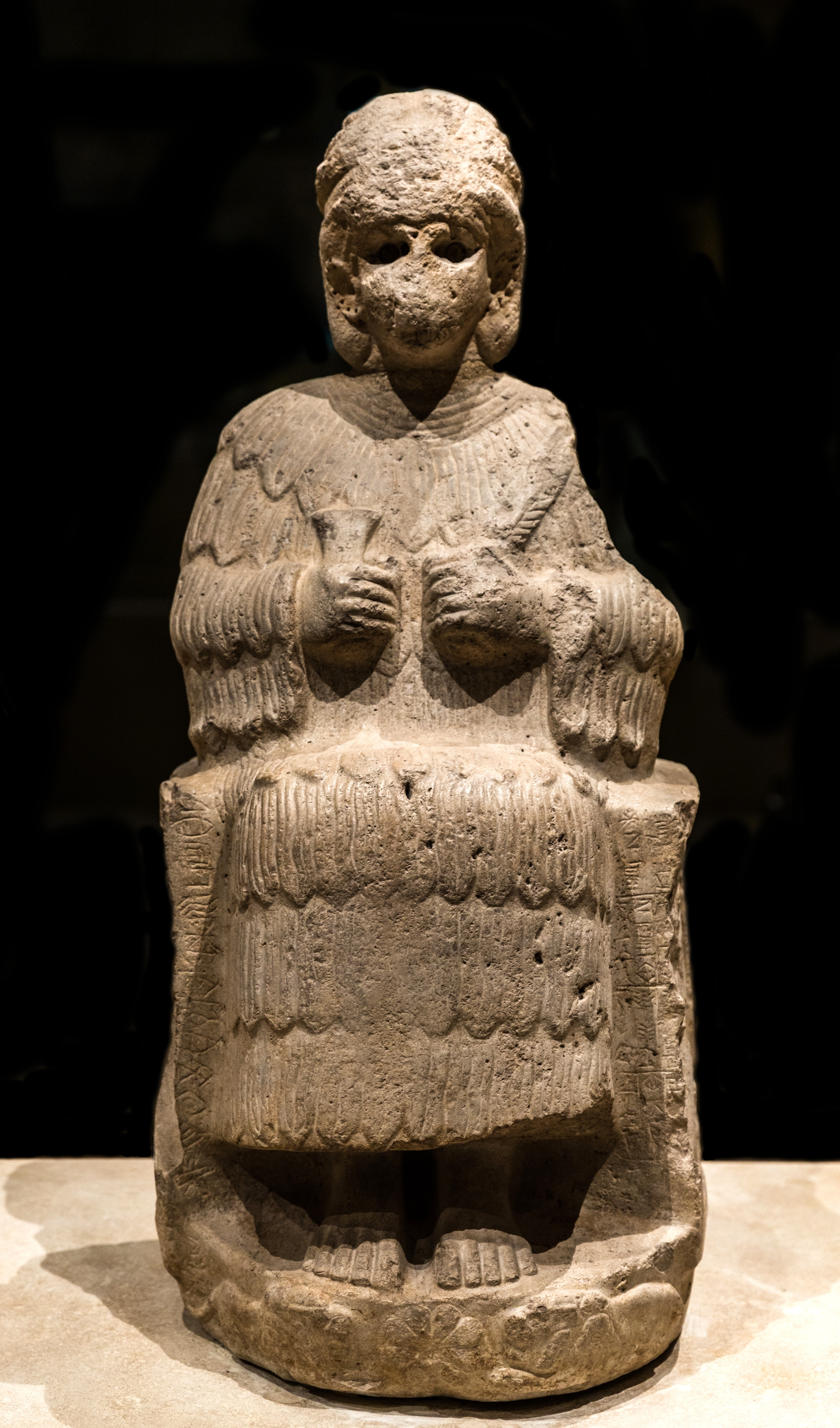
- A statue from Susa from the reign of Puzur-Inshushinak previously presumed to be a depiction of Narundi. Louvre.
- Major cult center: Susa

Genealogy
- Siblings: "Divine Seven or Elam" or Sebitti (in Mesopotamia)

Narundi (𒀭𒈾𒊒𒋾 ^{d}na-ru-ti) or Narunde was an Elamite goddess worshiped in Susa. She is attested there roughly between 2250 BCE and 1800 BCE. Multiple inscriptions mention her, and it assumed she was a popular deity at the time. In later periods, she occurs exclusively in Mesopotamia, where she played a role in apotropaic rituals in association with the Sebitti. Many attestations are available from late Assyrian sources, but it is not certain if they should be regarded as an indication of continuous worship.

== Name ==
The name Narundi is generally written as Na-ru-de_{3}/de/te/ti, Na-run-de/te, or Na-ru-da. According to Desset et al., the spelling of the name with an additional "n" represents a later version of the name from secondary nasalization. Texts from the time of Puzur-Inshushinak writes the name as na-ru_{9}-te_{4} or na-ru_{9}-ti, similar to other cases involving a switch-up between e and i, perhaps suggesting that Akkadian "i" and Elamite "e" were close in pronunciation.

== In Elam ==
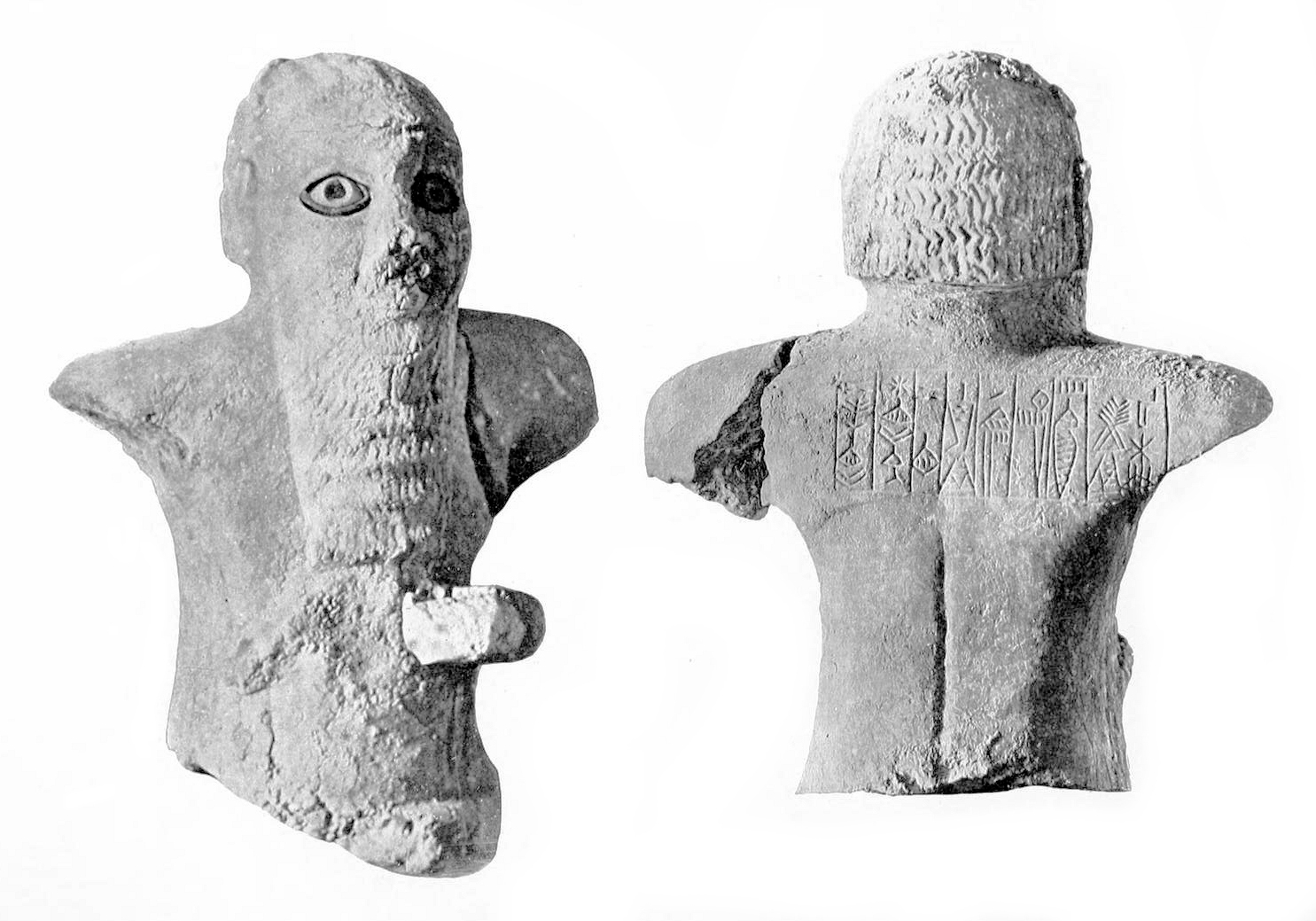
Archaic votive statue with Eshpum's inscription in the back

Narundi is the oldest attested Elamite deity. She first appears in sources contemporaneous with the reign of the Akkadian Empire, and according to Javier Álvarez-Mon enjoyed a degree of popularity in the early periods. Heidemarie Koch suggested that she functioned as the goddess of victory. She was worshiped in Susa at least since around 2260 BCE, as indicated by a statue dedicated to her found in the so-called "Manishtushu shrine." Its style is characteristic for the Mesopotamian art of the Early Dynastic IIIa period (roughly 2500 BCE), though the inscription is some 250 years more recent, and states that Eshpum, a local official, dedicated it to Narundi on behalf of Maništušu, king of the Akkadian Empire:

𒈠𒀭𒅖𒌅𒋢 / 𒈗 / 𒆧 / 𒀹𒅗 / 𒀵𒋢 / 𒀀𒈾 / 𒀭𒈾𒊒𒋾 / 𒀀𒈬𒈾𒊒
"ma-an-iš-tu-su / lugal / kiš / eš_{18}-pum / ARAD_{2}-su / a-na / ^{{d}}na-ru-ti / a mu-na-ru
For Manishtushu king of Kish, Eshpum his servant, dedicated this statue to Narundi"

According to Nancy Highcock, Eshpum most likely repurposed the statue of an anonymous earlier worshiper after finding it during a refurbishment of a temple, possibly choosing it for this purpose because of its antiquity. It is presently in the collection of the Louvre (signature S82).

In the same period Narundi also appears in a treaty of Naram-Sin.

=== During the reign of Puzur-Inshushinak ===
In sources from Puzur-Inshushinak's reign Narundi is the second most commonly mentioned deity after Inshushinak. A statue presumed to be a depiction of her known from this period. It is the earliest known life-size statue assumed to depict a deity. The head was discovered in the acropole area of Susa in 1904, while the body in the same location in 1907, and they were joined in 1967 in the Louvre. It is inscribed with text in both Akkadian cuneiform and linear Elamite. The usual identification of the statue as a representation of Narundi rests exclusively on the assumption that her name occurs in the latter, which remains uncertain. More recently Desset had identified the name in Linear Elamite to be Belat-ekallim instead (who he believes refers to Innana). She is depicted wearing a kaunakes covering most of her body, though not the hands and the feet, as well as headgear with four pairs of horns. She holds a palm leaf and a goblet, and sits on a throne decorated with three pairs of roaring lions. Similarities between the iconography of this presumed representation of Narundi with Mesopotamian depictions of Inanna have been pointed out. Occasionally it is suggested that it might have been a representation of the latter taken to Susa as a spoil of war and subsequently inscribed.

Puzur-Inshushinak also mentions Narundi in curse formulas. An inscription on a votive table invokes her alongside Inshushinak, Inanna and Nergal to prevent its destruction. Another, identified on a small statuette, implores her, Inshushinak, Shamash, Nergal and a deity whose names is not preserved to deprive anyone who removes it of descendants. On a commemorative stele describing the construction of a temple of a canal she is listed after Inshushinak, Shamash, Enlil, Enki, Ishtar, Sin and Ninhursag, and before the "totality of the gods." It is possible that the selection of deities was meant to imitate inscriptions of Naram-Sin, with the lead deities of the local Elamite pantheon added to the customary list of major members of the Mesopotamian pantheon. In some of Puzur-Inshushinak’s curse formulas, Simut is replaced by Nergal in Akkadian but not Narundi. It is suggested that Narundi does not have a designated Mesopotamian equivalent.

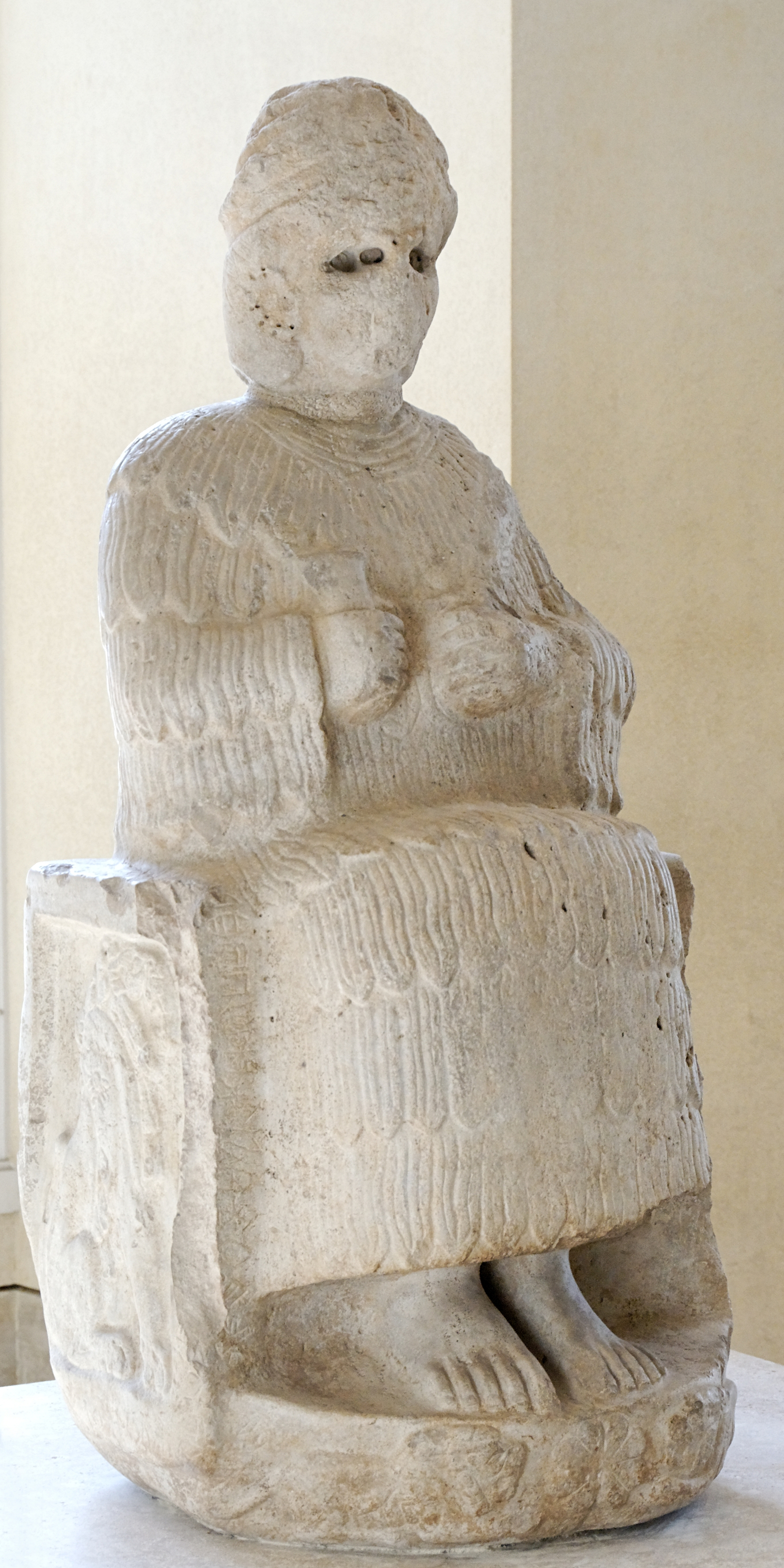
The statue, inscribed with text in Linear Elamite and in Akkadian.

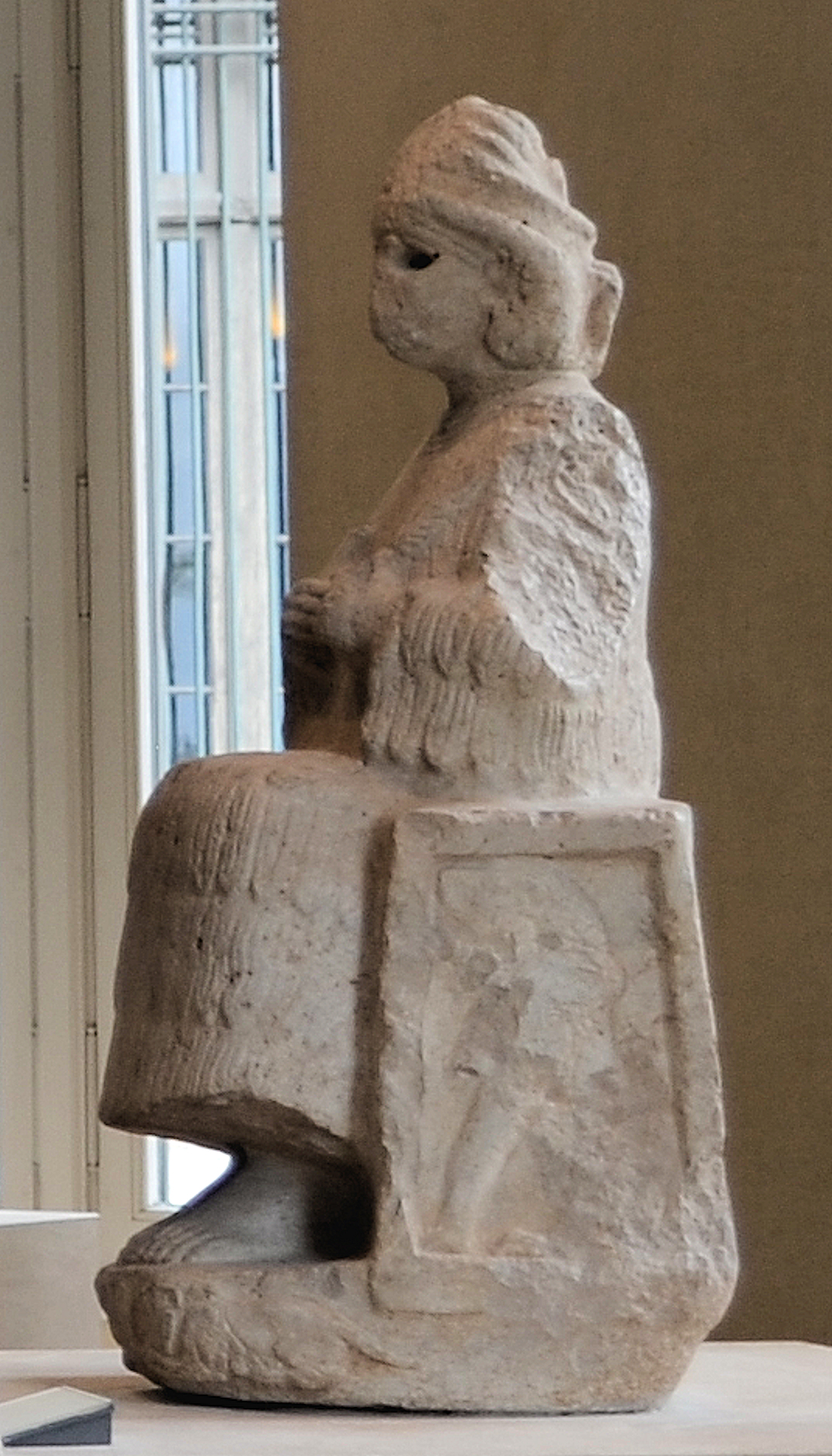
The lions on the side of the throne

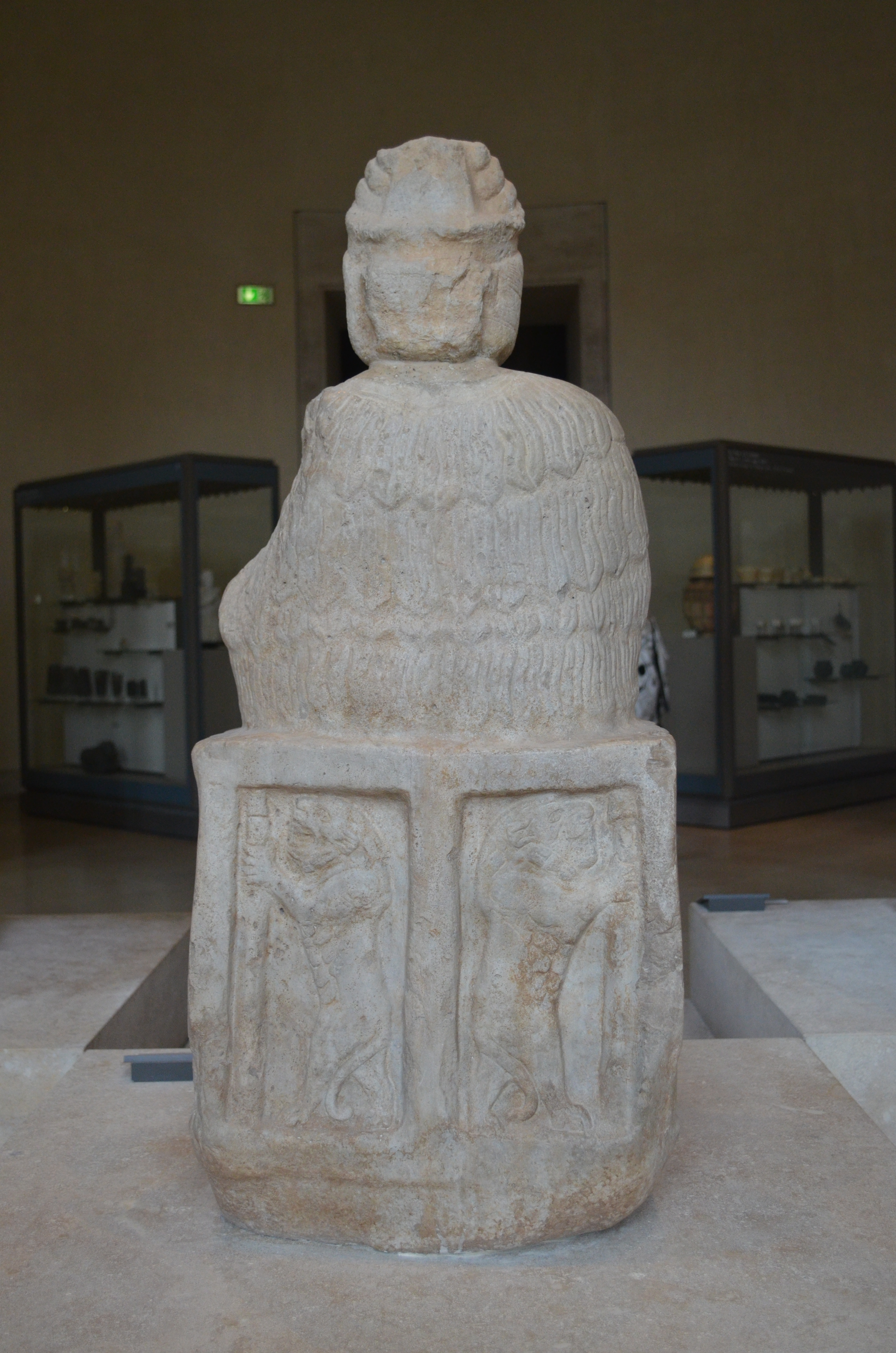
The lions on the back of the throne

=== Later Elamite attestations ===
Around the year 1800 BCE Attahušu, a sukkalmah of Elam, built a temple dedicated to Narundi. While she is also attested contemporarily in both masculine and feminine theophoric names from Susa, such as Elamite Ku-uk-Na-ru-de and Akkadian ^{d}Na-ru-de-um-mi, in the following periods she is no longer appears in any Elamite sources.

== In Mesopotamia ==
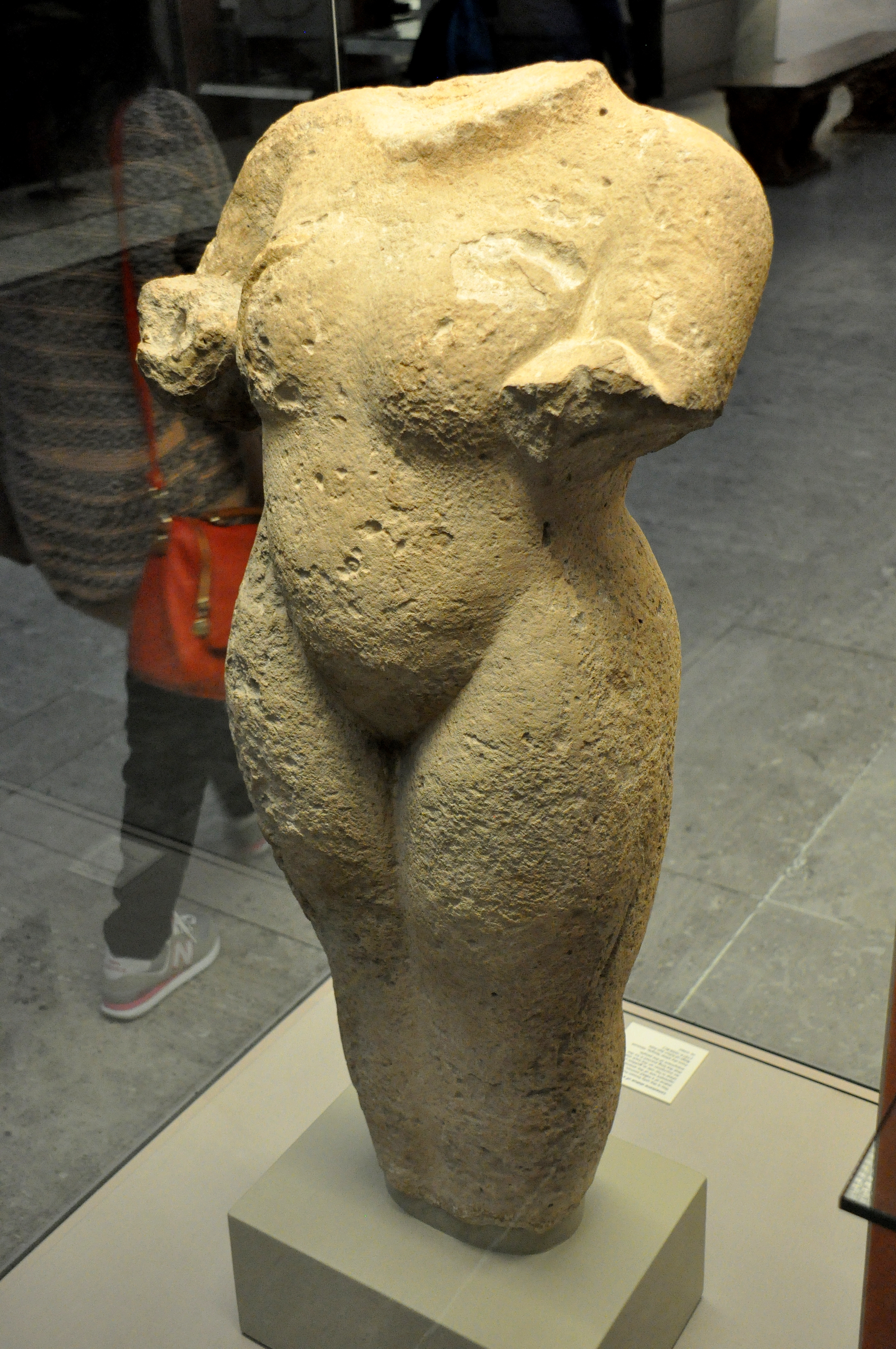
A figure from the reign of Ashur-bel-kala, identified as Frans Wiggermann as possible depiction of Narundi.

References to Narundi postdating the last attestations of her in Elamite sources come from Mesopotamia. She is present in an Old Babylonian god list from Nippur. She also appears in a single feminine theophoric name, Narudi-gamilat, identified in a document from this city dealing with servile weavers and dated to the reign of Rim-Sin I of Larsa. Frans Wiggermann asserts that she could be equated with Ishtar or Nanaya in their respective war-related roles. She was commonly viewed as a sister of the Sebitti. Alternative she could be referred to as the sister of a group equated with them, in the god list An = Anum referred to as the "Divine Seven of Elam," possibly a "speculative and secondary" invention meant to reconcile the cultural difference between Narundi and Sebitti. According to Javier Álvarez-Mon, out of the seven members of the latter group, Šipali[x], Ibnahāš[x], Ibnasasa, Dahšišrīš, Rūšpānašpiš, Nahūndi and Igištu, only the last two appear in any other sources. Narundi's association with the Sebitti themselves is first attested in Middle Assyrian sources. She was worshiped alongside them in Assur. Wiggermann suggests that a statue of a naked woman from the reign of Ashur-bel-kala according to an accompanying inscription made "for titillation" and placed under the protection of the Sebitti might be a representation of Narundi or an analogous deity. Gina V. Konstantopoulos considers this implausible, as while she was the only female deity associated with this group, the inscriptions associates them with the west, rather than with Elam. In a tākultu ritual from the reign of Sennacherib, she is invoked in a purification ritual. According to Beate Pongratz-Leisten, it is impossible to evaluate if the Assyrian attestations of Narundi are an indication of a surviving continuous cult or if they simply constitute literary references to older rituals.

According to Mesopotamian sources Narundi's attribute was a timbūtu, an unidentified musical instrument, tentatively identified as a harp. In the so-called Bird Call Text, she is associated with two unidentified birds: katīmatu, whose cry is interpreted as "brother, brother," and siḫ-KUR, whose cry is "Alas, alas!" (u_{8}-u-a u_{8}-u-a). The katīmatu is otherwise sparsely attested, though it is known that its name is derived from the Akkadian verb katāmu, "to cover" or "to veil." The siḫ-KUR is presently impossible to identify. Wilfred G. Lambert noted that the text appears to only reflect the theological views typical for the first millennium BCE, and considered it impossible to evaluate if it dealt with preexisting connections between deities and birds, or if it invented them based on theological interpretation of the calls of the animals.

=== Textual sources ===
Narundi is mentioned in an apotropaic ritual meant to guarantee the protection of a home. It prescribes the preparation of figures representing her, the Sebitti (labeled as sons of Enmesharra), the twin gods Lugalirra and Meslamtaea, and the lion-like creature Ugallu. Her statuette had to be made of tamarisk wood and decorated with red and yellow pigment to represent a robe with a sash and headwear. Since no individual role is assigned to her, it is possible her presence relies on her connection to the Sebitti. While examples of statues presumed to originate in similar rituals are known from excavations, they cannot be identified with certainty as representations of specific deities.

In a Bīt mēseri ritual a reference to "the seven kings [Sebitti], and an eighth sister, Narunde" occurs. In Šurpu, she appears both alongside the Sebitti and other astral deities. Her name is rendered as ^{d}Na-ru-da in this source.

Narundi also appears in a number of birth incantations alongside Nahhunte. One example is The Cow of Sin, a text in which they both aid the eponymous god. An ancient commentary on this text identifies Narundi and Nahhunte as respectively solar and lunar deities, but according to Matthew W. Stolper this is most likely a mistake, as Nahhunte was a solar god.
