= Puzur-Inshushinak =

Puzur-Inshushinak 𒅤𒊭𒀭𒈹𒂞
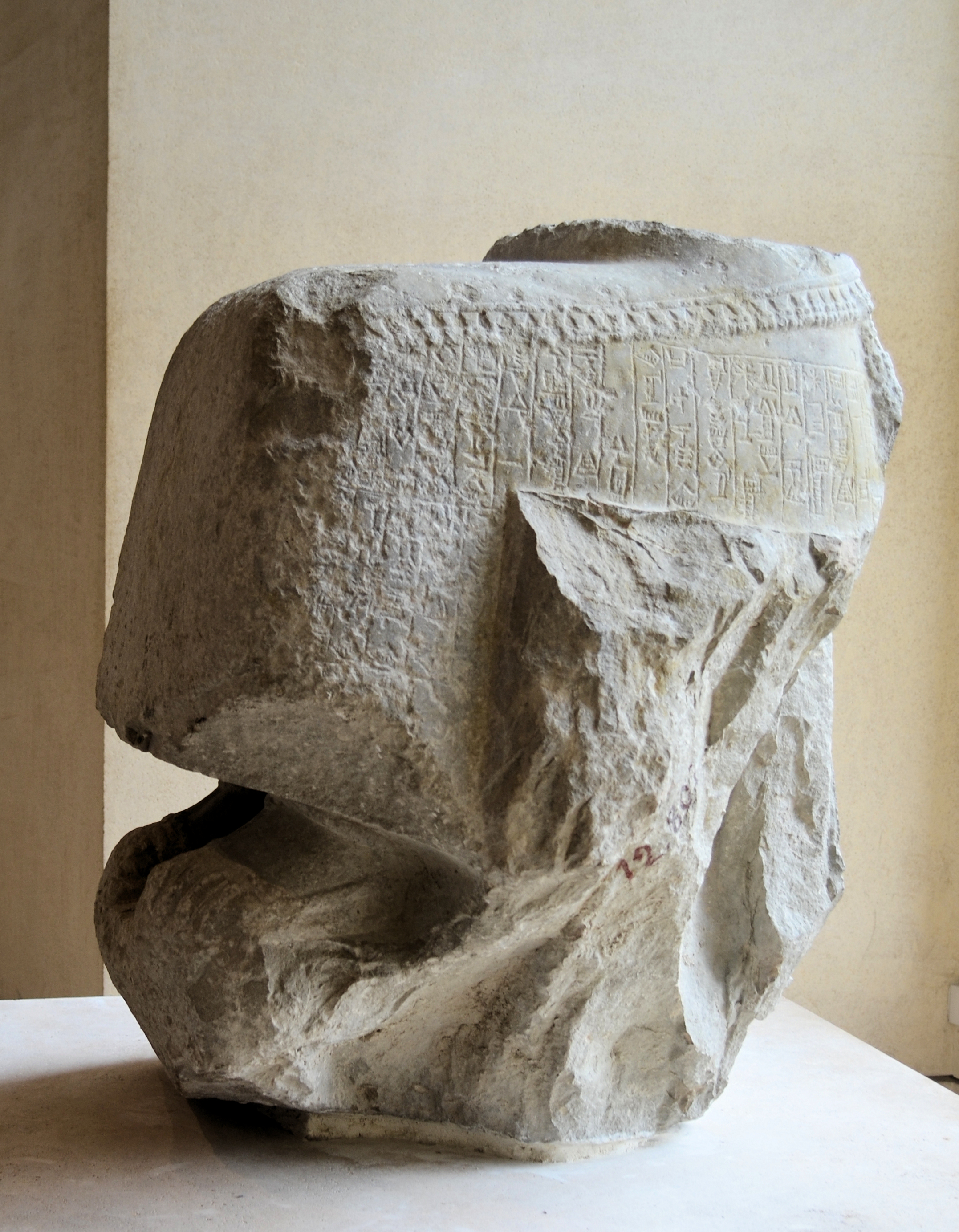
- Statue of Puzur-Inshushinak (lower half of seated ruler) with inscription in his name and victories, particularly over the king of Shimashki

King of Elam
- Reign: c. 2125 – c. 2110 BC
- Predecessor: Possibly Hita'a
- Successor: Position abolished
- Died: c. 2110 BC
- Father: Shinpi-khish-khuk

Location of Susa

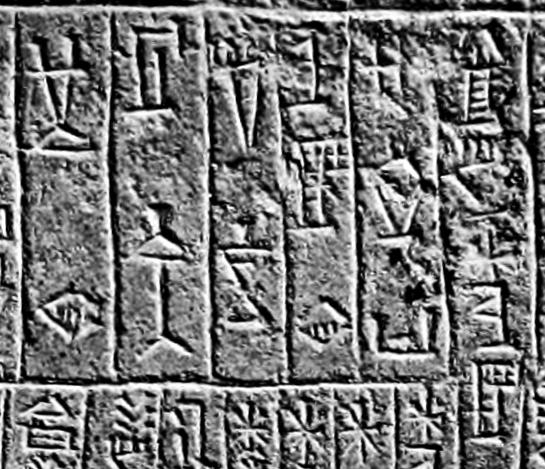
𒅤𒊭𒀭𒈹𒂞 𒑐𒋼𒋛 𒈹𒂞𒆠 𒄊𒀴 𒈣𒋾 𒉏𒆠 puzur-inshushinak ensi shushi^{ki} shakkanakku mati NIM^{ki} "Puzur-Inshushinak, Ensi of Susa and Shakkanakku of Elam" "Table au Lion", Louvre Museum

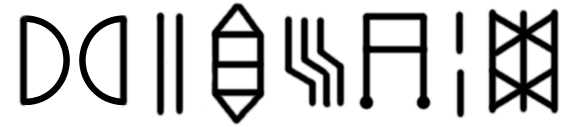
Puzur-Inshushinak (Linear Elamite: Puzur Sušinak; Akkadian: 𒌋𒌋𒀭𒈹𒂞, puzur_{3}-^{d}inšušinak, also 𒅤𒊭𒀭𒈹𒂞, puzur_{4}-^{d}inšušinak "Inshushinak (is) protection"; died c. 2110 BC), also sometimes thought to read Kutik-Inshushinak in Elamite, was a king of Elam, and the last from the Awan dynasty according to the Susa kinglist. He mentions his father's name as Šimpi-išhuk, which, being an Elamite name, suggests that Puzur-Inshuhinak himself was Elamite. He is also the first historical figure in Elamite history.

== Early life ==
Elam had been a vassal of Akkad since the time of Sargon. His father was Šimpi-išhuk, the crown prince, and most likely a brother of Khita. Kutik-Inshushinak's first position was as governor of Susa, which he may have held from a young age. Around 2130 BC his father died, and he became crown prince in his stead.

== Reign ==
Kutik-Inshushinak accordingly campaigned in the Zagros mountains on their behalf. He was greatly successful as his conquests seem to have gone beyond the initial mission.

=== Akkadian period ===
In the inscription of the "Table au Lion", he appears as "Puzur-Inshushin(ak) Ensi (Governor) of Susa, Shakkanakku (Military Governor) of the country of Elam" (𒅤𒊭𒀭𒈹𒂞 𒑐𒋼𒋛 𒈹𒂞𒆠 𒄊𒀴 𒈣𒋾 𒉏𒆠 puzur-inshushinak ensi shushi^{ki} skakkanakku mati NIM^{ki}), a title used by his predecessors Eshpum, Epirmupi, and Ili-ishmani as governors of Akkad for the territory of Elam. In another inscription, he calls himself the "Mighty King of Elam", suggesting an accession to independence from the weakening Kingdom of Akkad.

Inscribed blocks found in the early excavations at Susa, apparently from a staircase, had separate partly fragmentary Akkadian language and Linear Elamite inscriptions on two separate topics. The Akkadian text mentions Puzur-Inshushinak described as "šakkanakku of the land of Elam".

Under King Shar-Kali-Sharri, Akkad weakened, allowing Elam to claim independence. He conquered Anshan and managed to unite most of Elam into one kingdom.

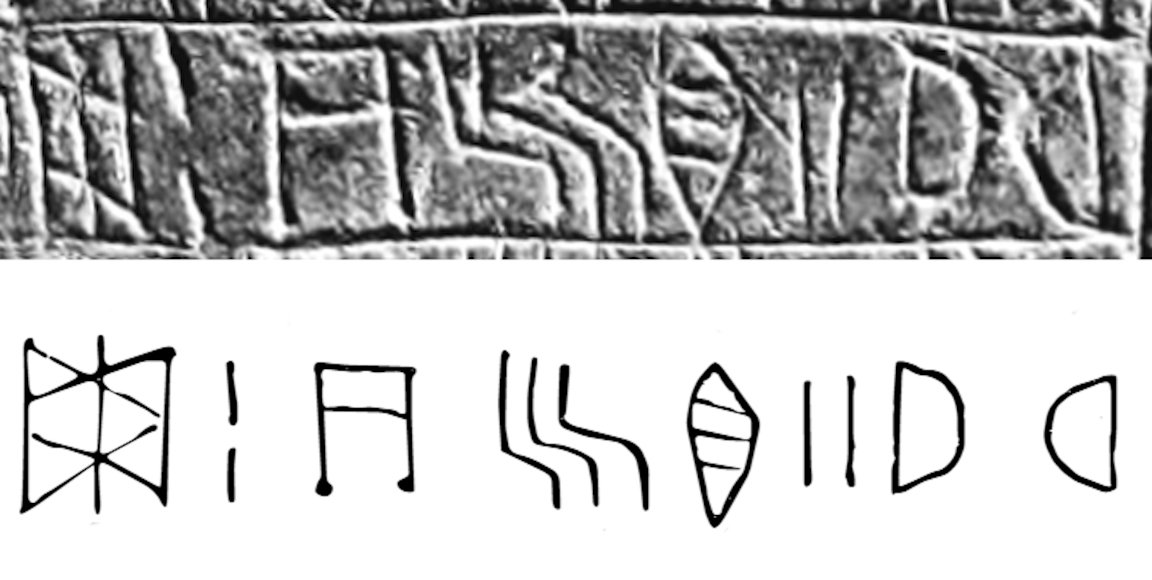
The Elamite name of Puzur-Inshushinak: Pu-zu-r Šu-ši-na-k in the Linear Elamite script (right to left).

Early on his inscriptions were in Akkadian but over time they came to be also in Linear Elamite. He built extensively on the citadel at Susa, and encouraged the use of the Linear Elamite script to write the Elamite language. Most inscriptions in Linear Elamite date from the reign of Kutik-Inshushinak.

=== Ur III period ===
At the beginning of Ur III period, inscriptions of Ur-Nammu (r. 2112-2094 BC) refer to Puzur-Inshushinak. He conquered numerous cities in central Mesopotamia, including Eshnunna and Akkad, and probably Akshak. His conquests probably encroached considerably on Gutian territory, gravely weakening them, and making them unable to withstand the Neo-Sumerian revolt of Utu-hengal.

It is now known that his reign in Elam overlapped with that of Ur-Nammu of Ur-III, although the previous lengthy estimates of the duration of the intervening Gutian dynasty and rule of Utu-hengal of Uruk had not allowed for that synchronism. Ur-Nammu, who styled himself "King of Sumer and Akkad" is probably the one who, early in his reign, reconquered the northern territories that had been occupied by Puzur-Inshushinak, before going on to conquer Susa.

== Death ==
His achievements were not long-lasting, for after his death the linear script fell into disuse, and Susa was overrun by the Third dynasty of Ur under Ur-Nammu and his son Shulgi. Ur had held control over Susa after the demise of Puzur-Inshushinak, and they built numerous buildings and temples there. This control was continued by Shulgi as shown by his numerous dedications in the city-state. He also engaged in marital alliances, by marrying his daughters to rulers of eastern territories, such as Anshan, Marhashi and Bashime. Subsequently, Elam fell under control of the Shimashki dynasty.

== Attestations ==
=== Statue of Puzur-Inshushinak ===
The bottom part of a statue, probably representing Puzur-Inshushinak himself, is visible in the Louvre Museum, Sb 55. The statue lists the numerous victories of Puzur-Inshushinak over neighbouring territories, and particularly mentions the submission of the king of Shimashki who "kissed his feet".

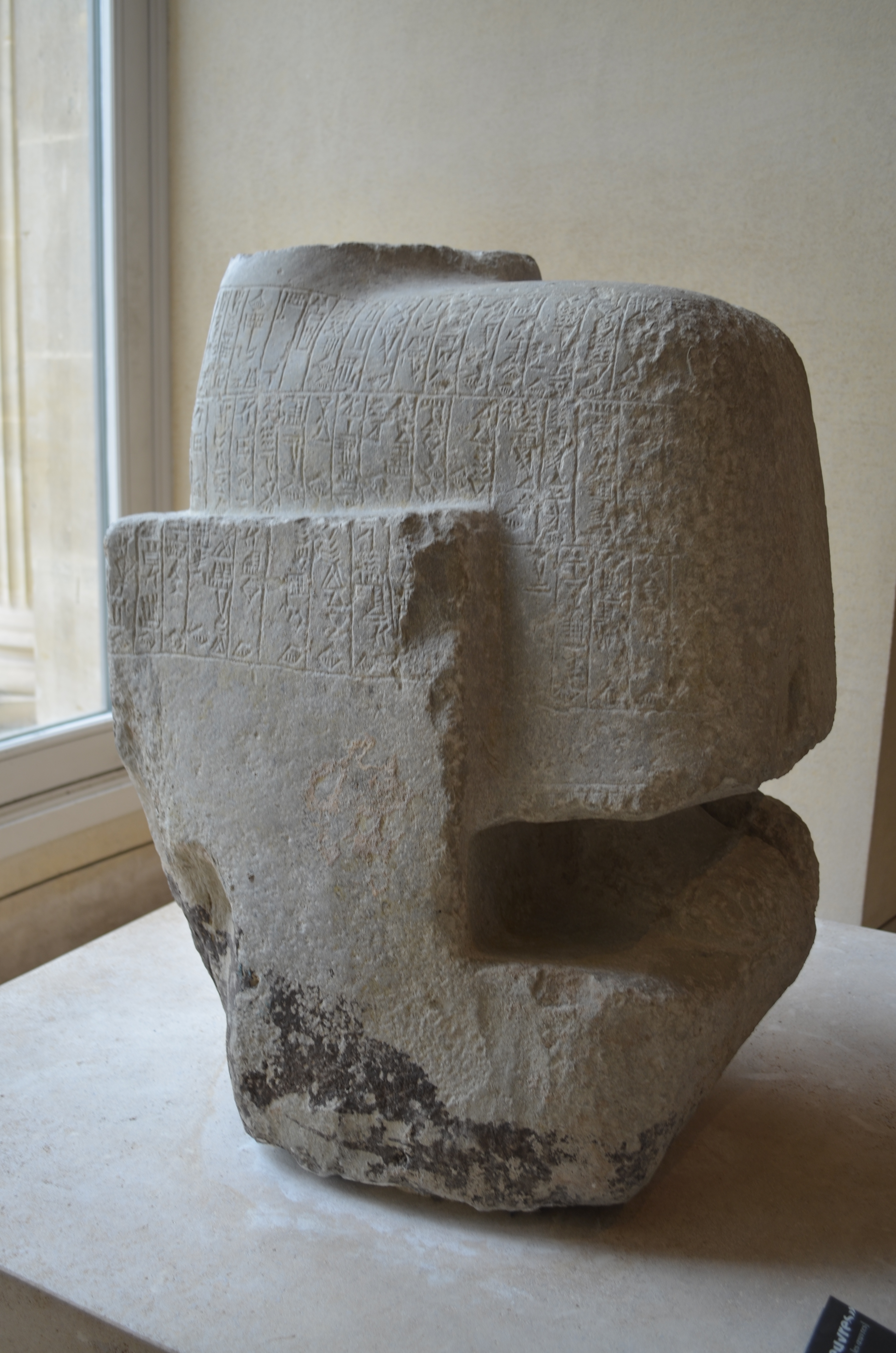
Right side

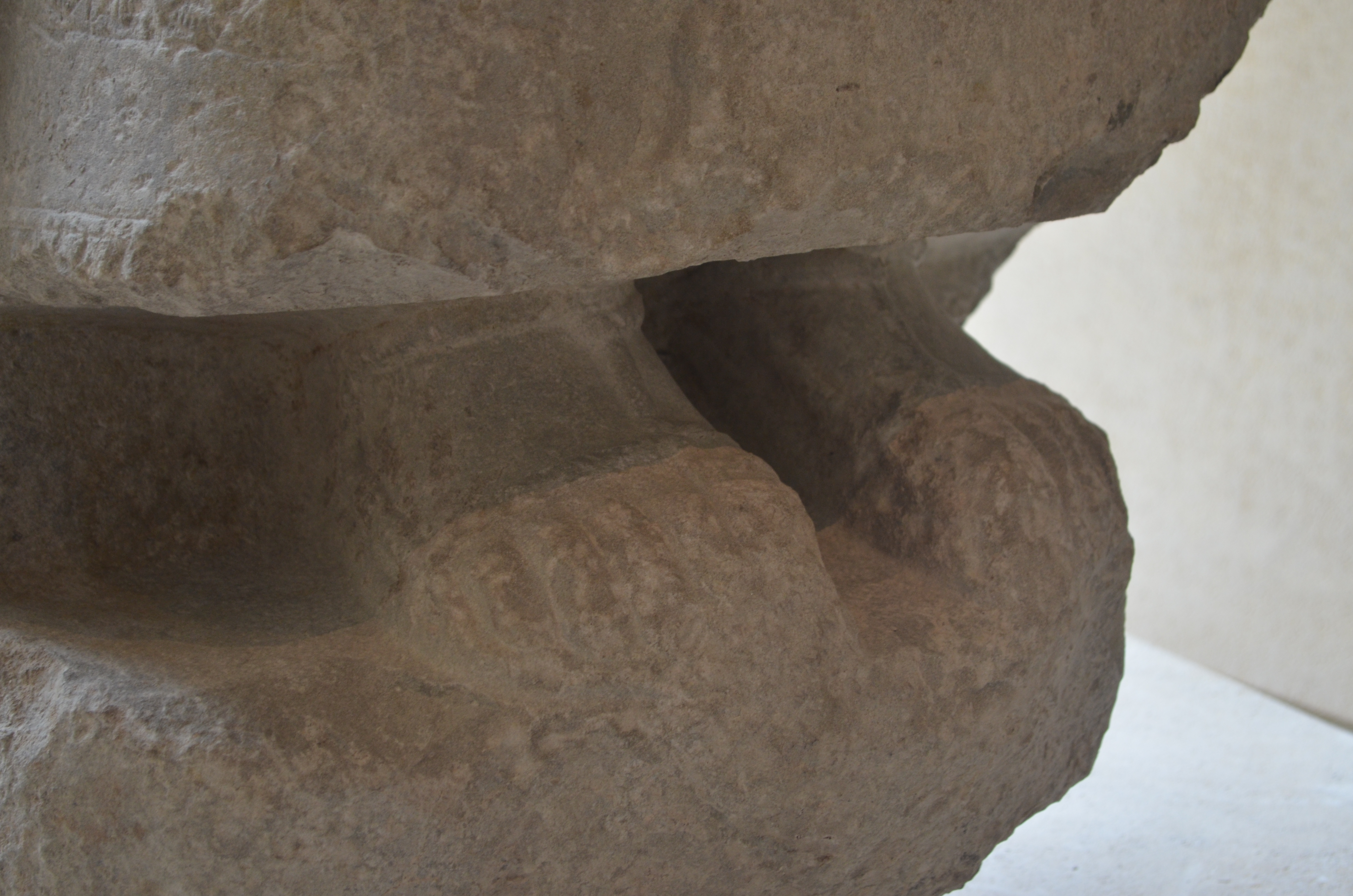
Feet with sandals

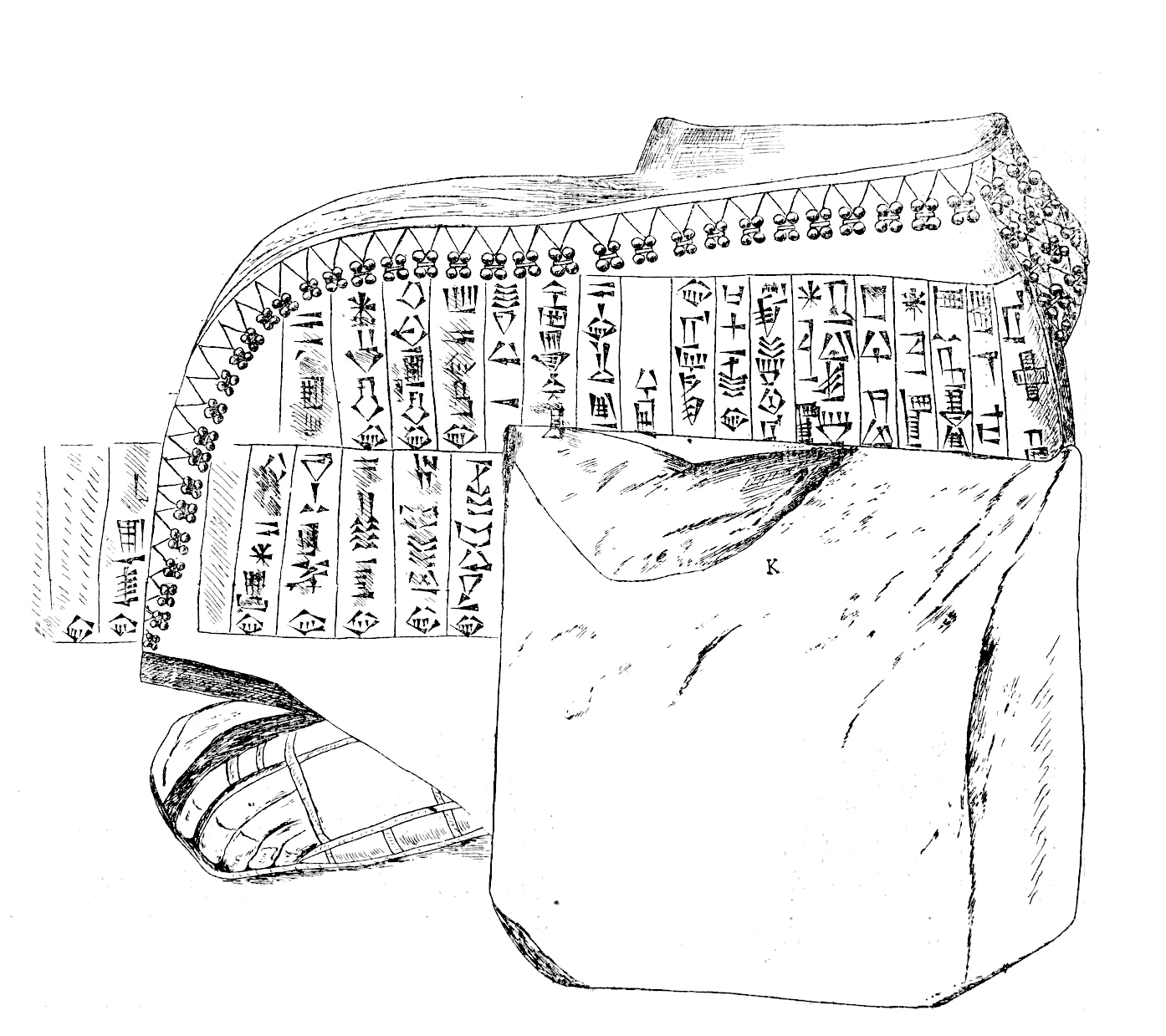
Inscriptions of the statue of Puzur-Inshushinak (left side)

=== Inscriptions ===
A possible mention of Puzur-Inshushinak appears in one of Puzer-Mama's inscriptions, but this is considered doubtful by Walter Sommerfeld and Piotr Steinkeller.

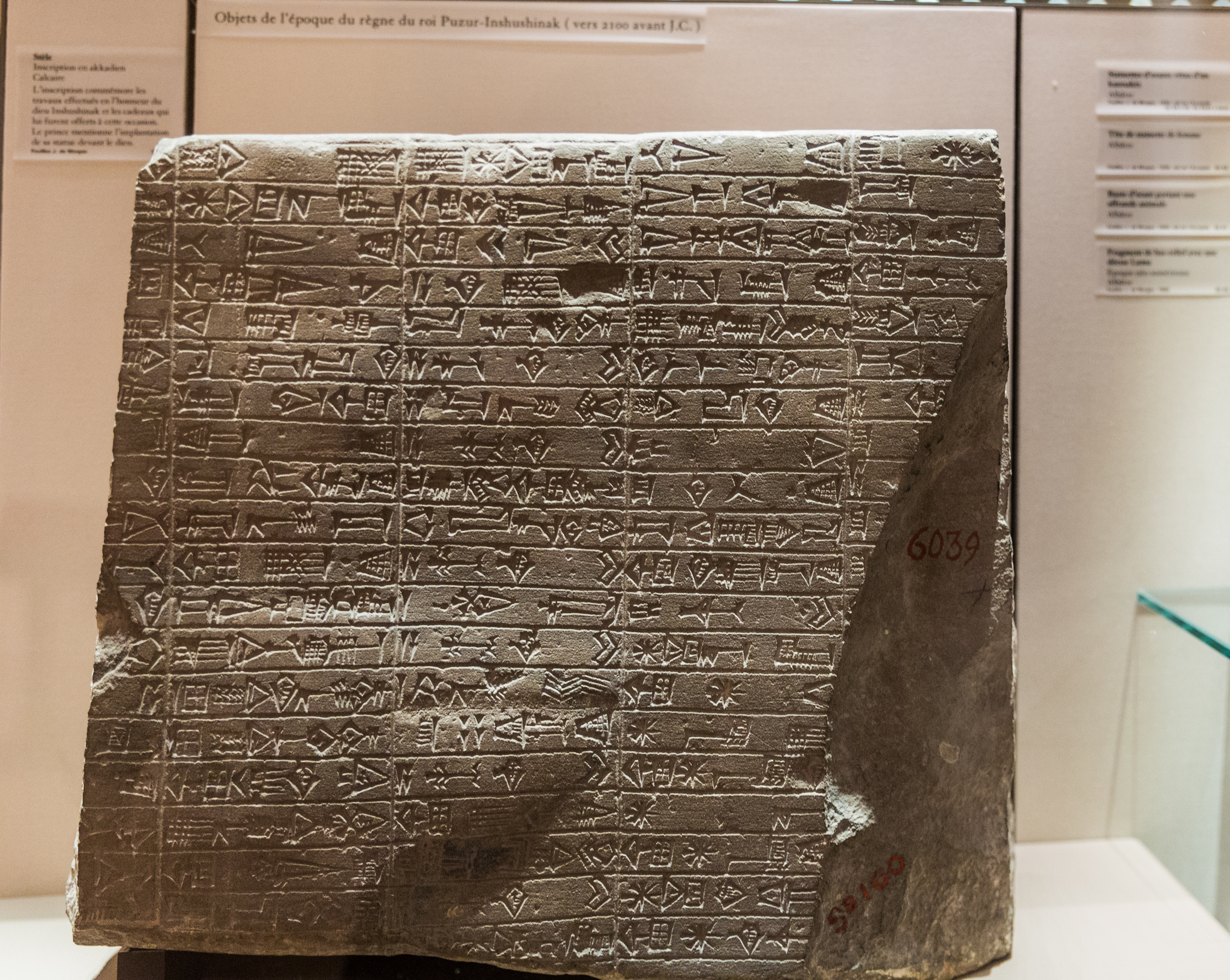
Dedication by Puzu-Inshunishak in the Akkadian language. Louvre Museum, reference Sb 160.

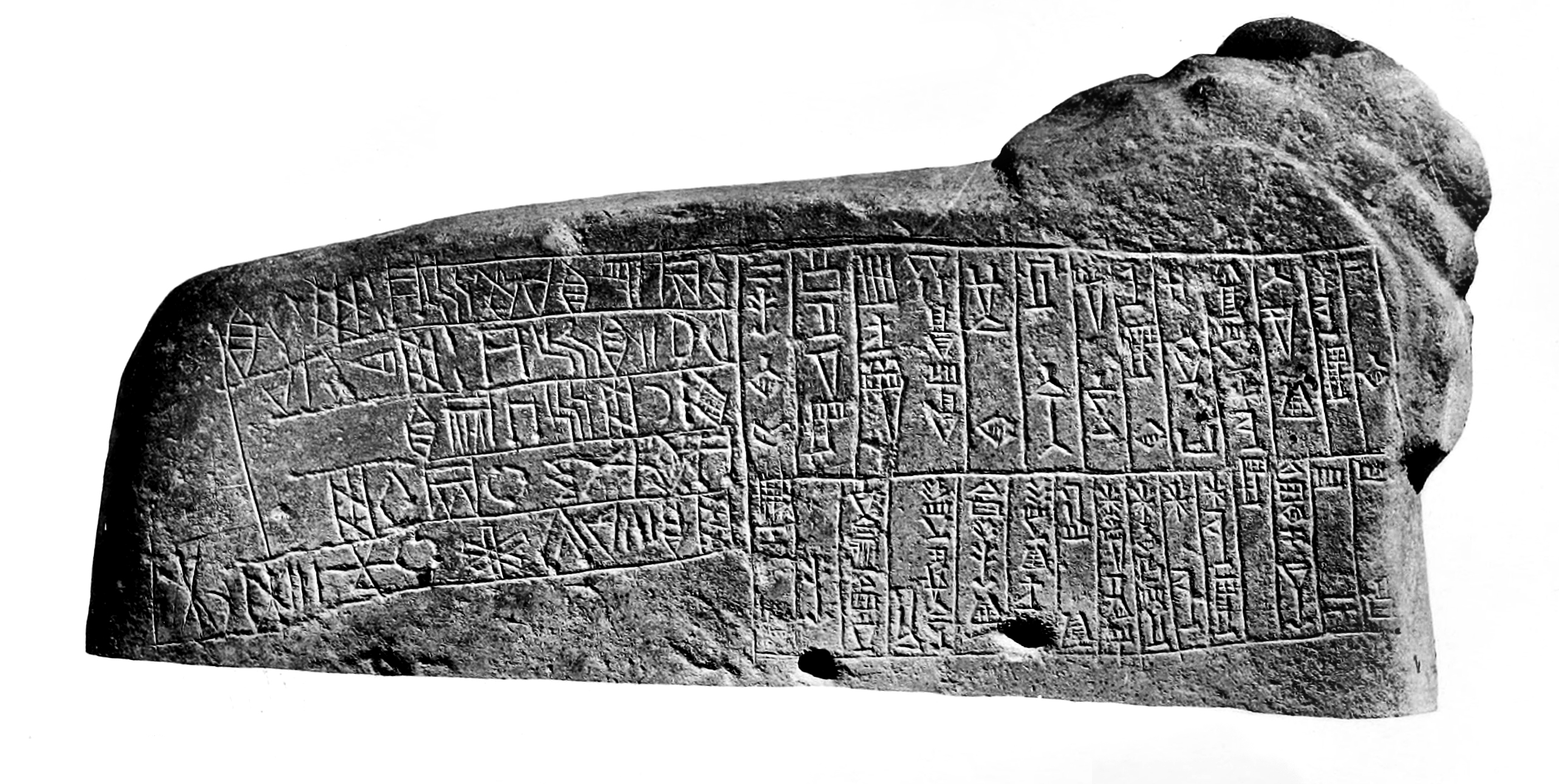
Bilingual Linear Elamite-Akkadian inscription of king Puzur-Inshushinak "Ensi of Susa". Table of the Lion, Louvre Museum Sb 17.

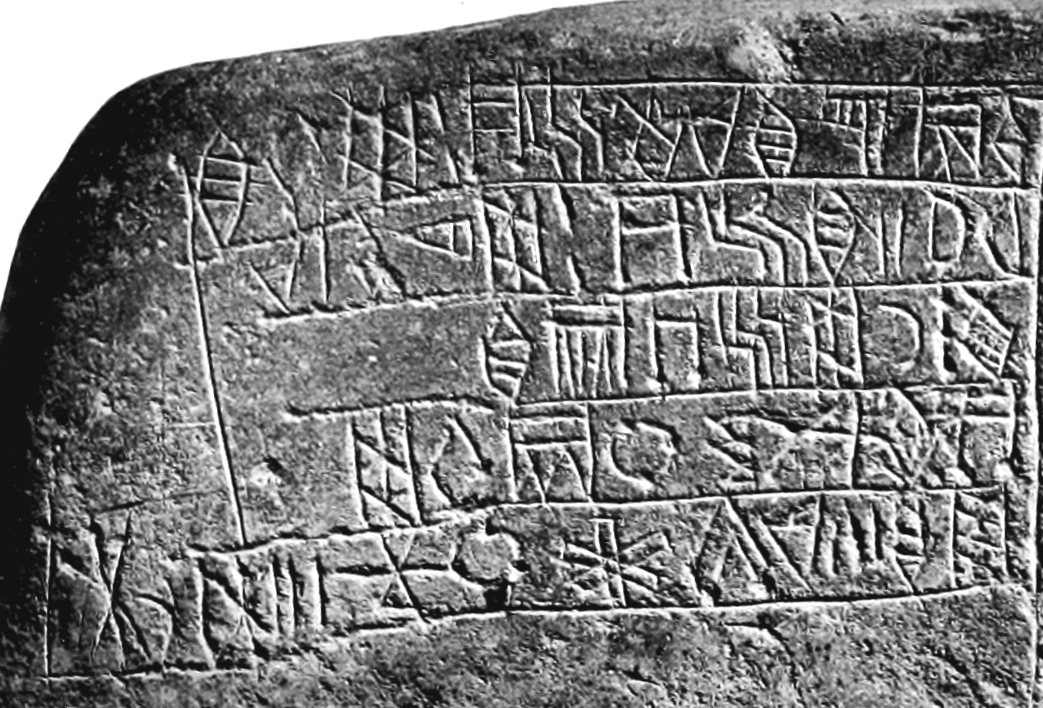
Linear Elamite inscription of king Kutik-Inshushinak, "Table du Lion", Louvre Museum Sb 17.

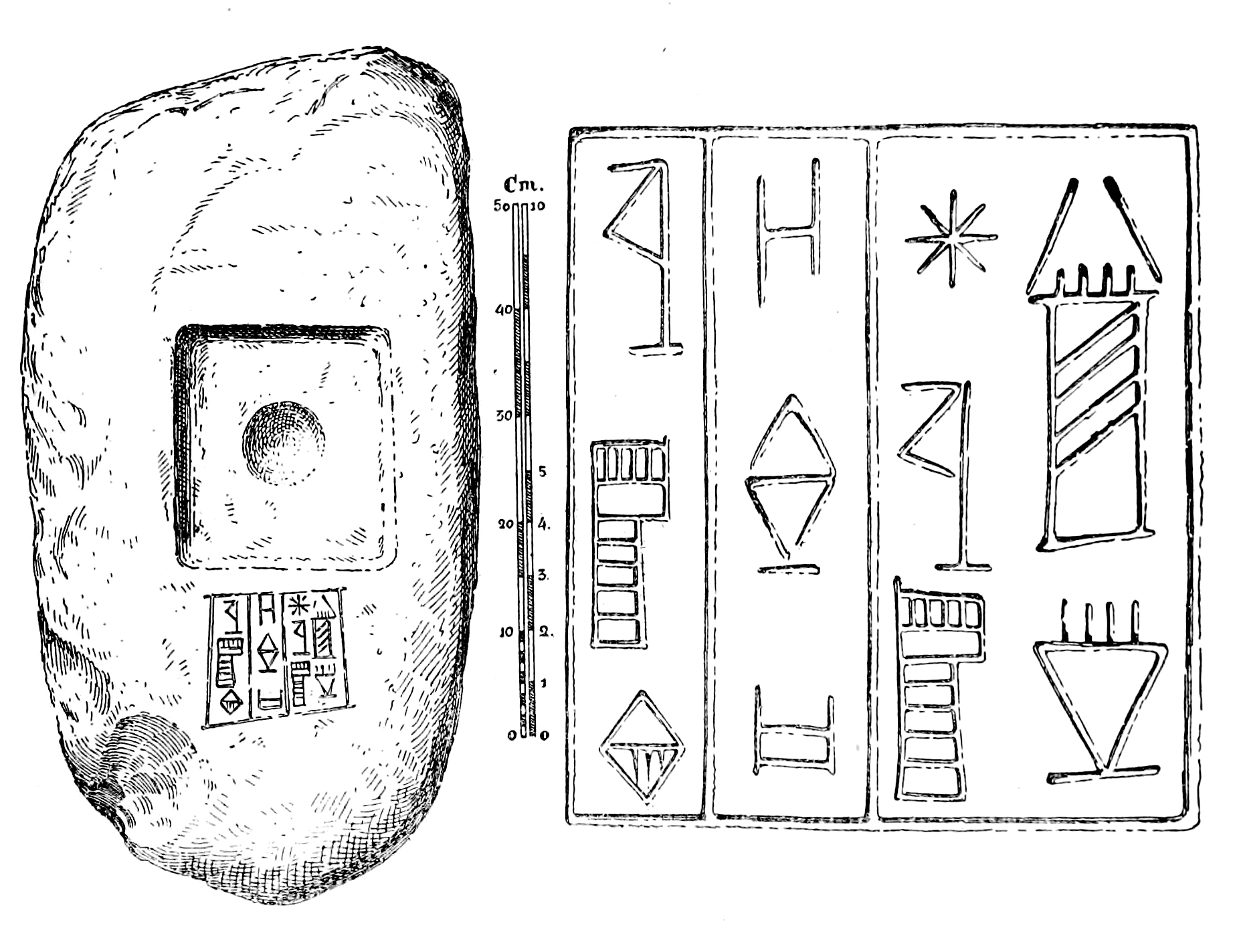
Door socket with inscription "Puzur-Inshushinak Ensi of Susa" (𒅤𒊭𒀭𒈹𒂞 𒑐𒋼𒋛 𒈹𒂞𒆠)

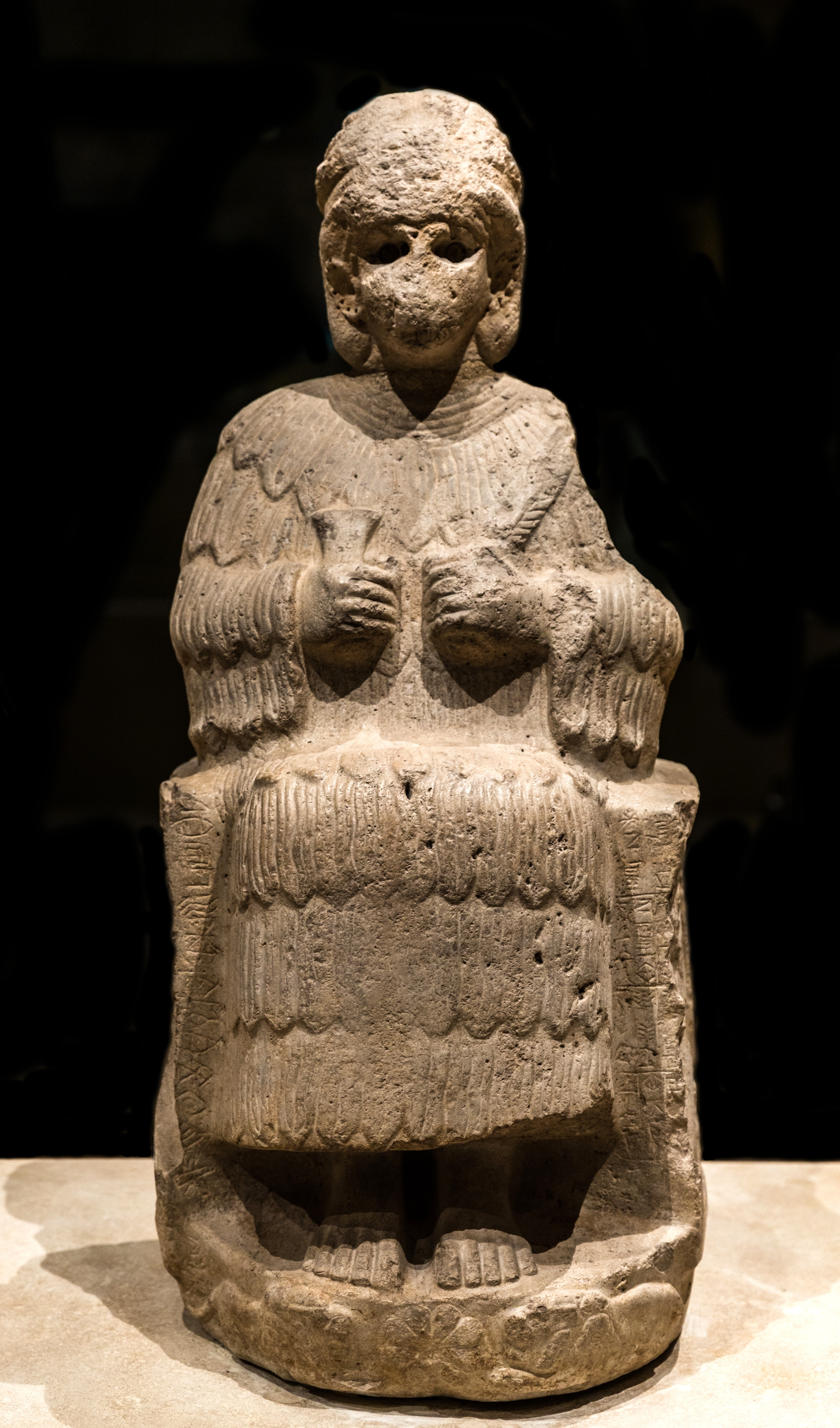
Statue of goddess Narundi dedicated by Puzur-Inshushinak, with inscriptions in Linear Elamite and in Akkadian, Louvre Museum

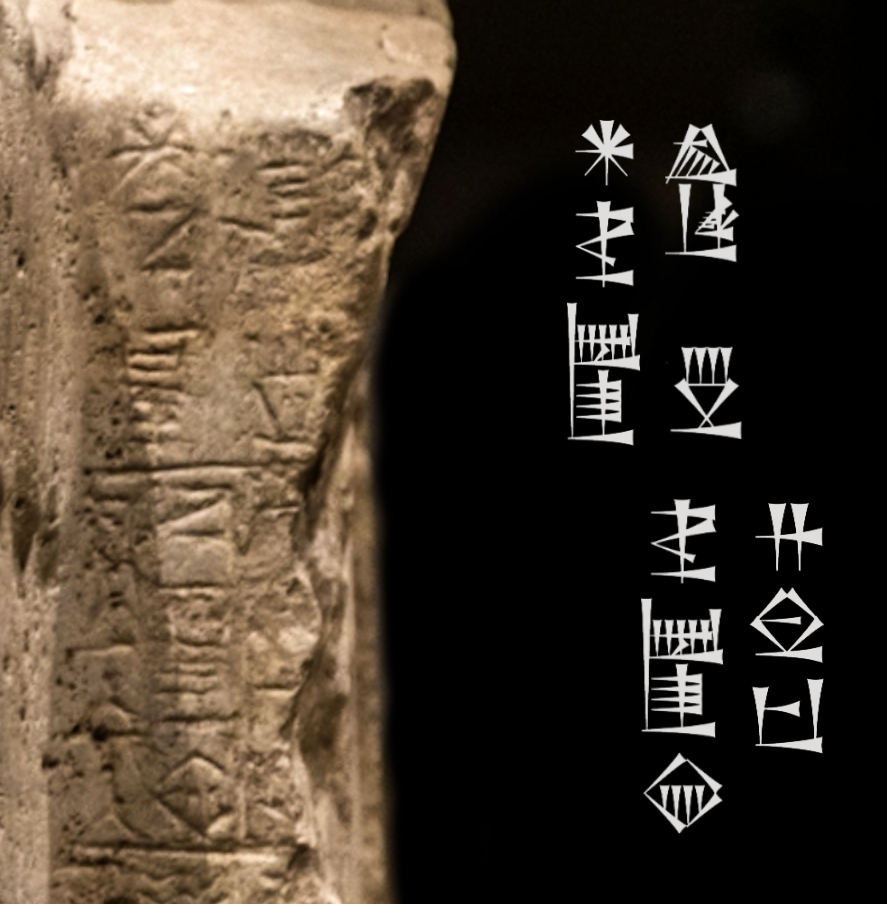
"Puzur-Inshushinak, Governor of Susa", on the statue of the Goddess Narundi

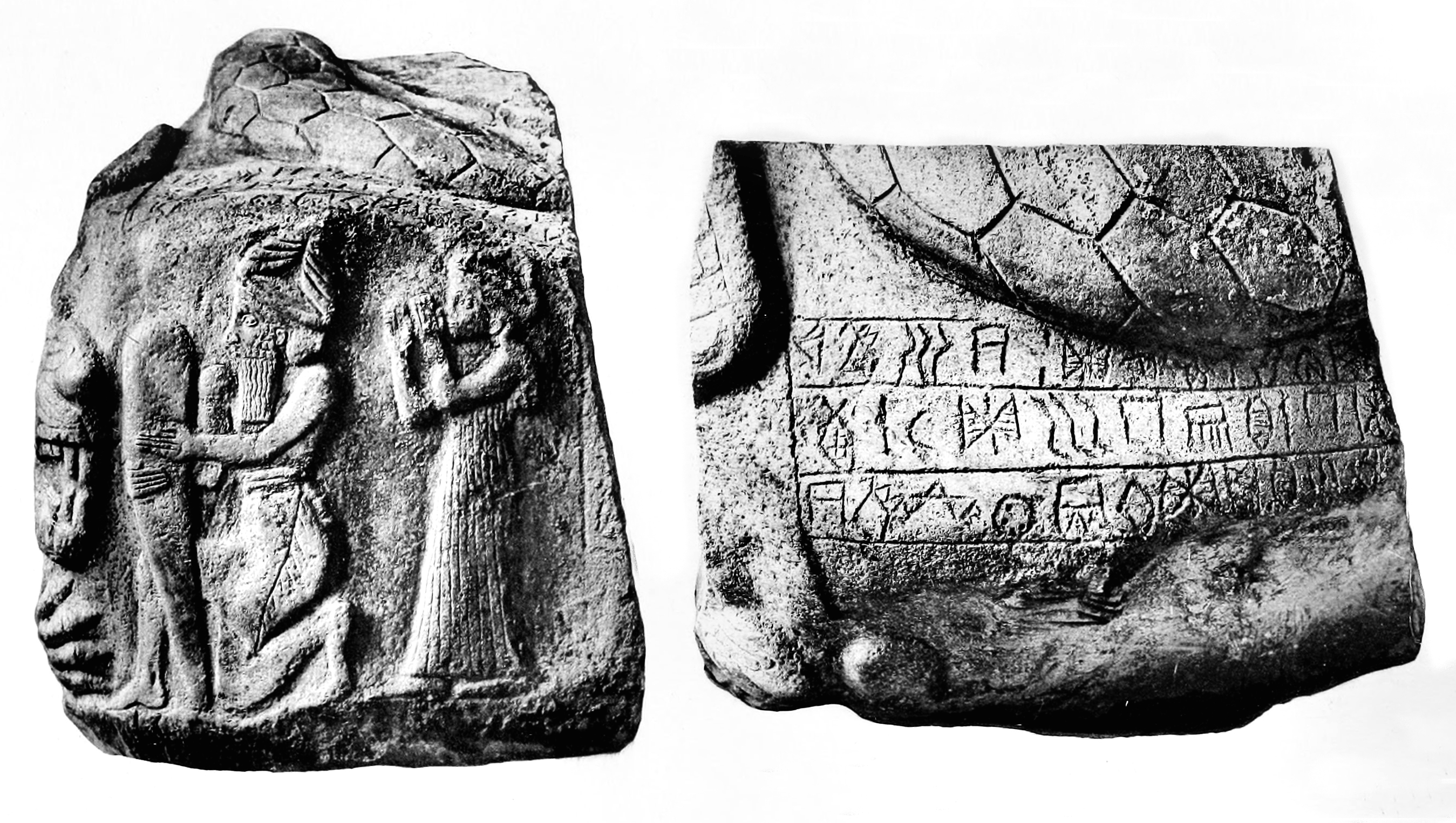
Perforated stone, with Linear Elamite text. Louvre Museum Sb6 Sb177

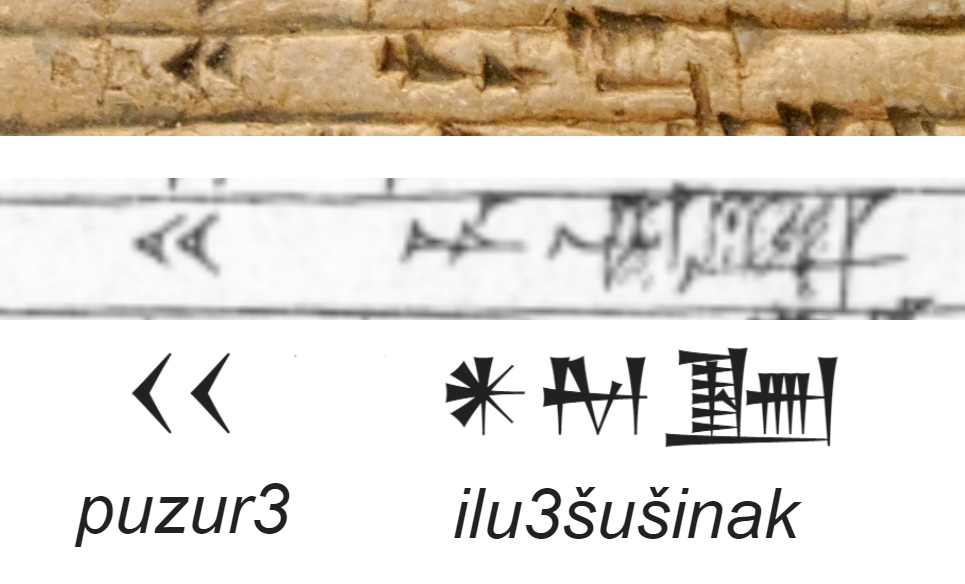
Puzur-Inshushinak on the Awan Kings List

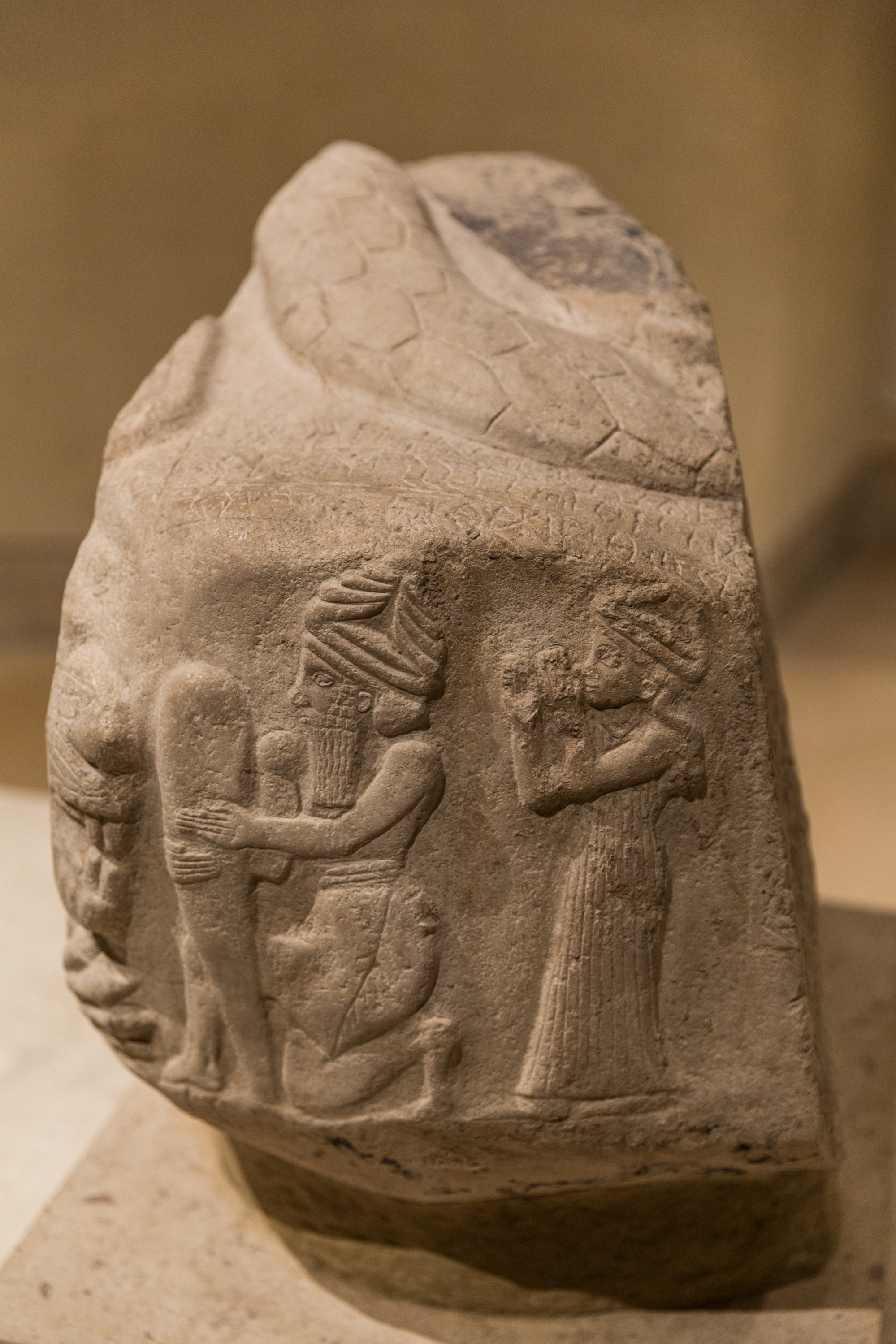
A God putting a foundation nail in the ground, protected by a Lama goddess, in front of a roaring lion. Coiled snake on top. Inscriptions in Linear Elamite and Akkadian. Time of Puzur-Inshushinak, circa 2100 BC, Louvre Museum.

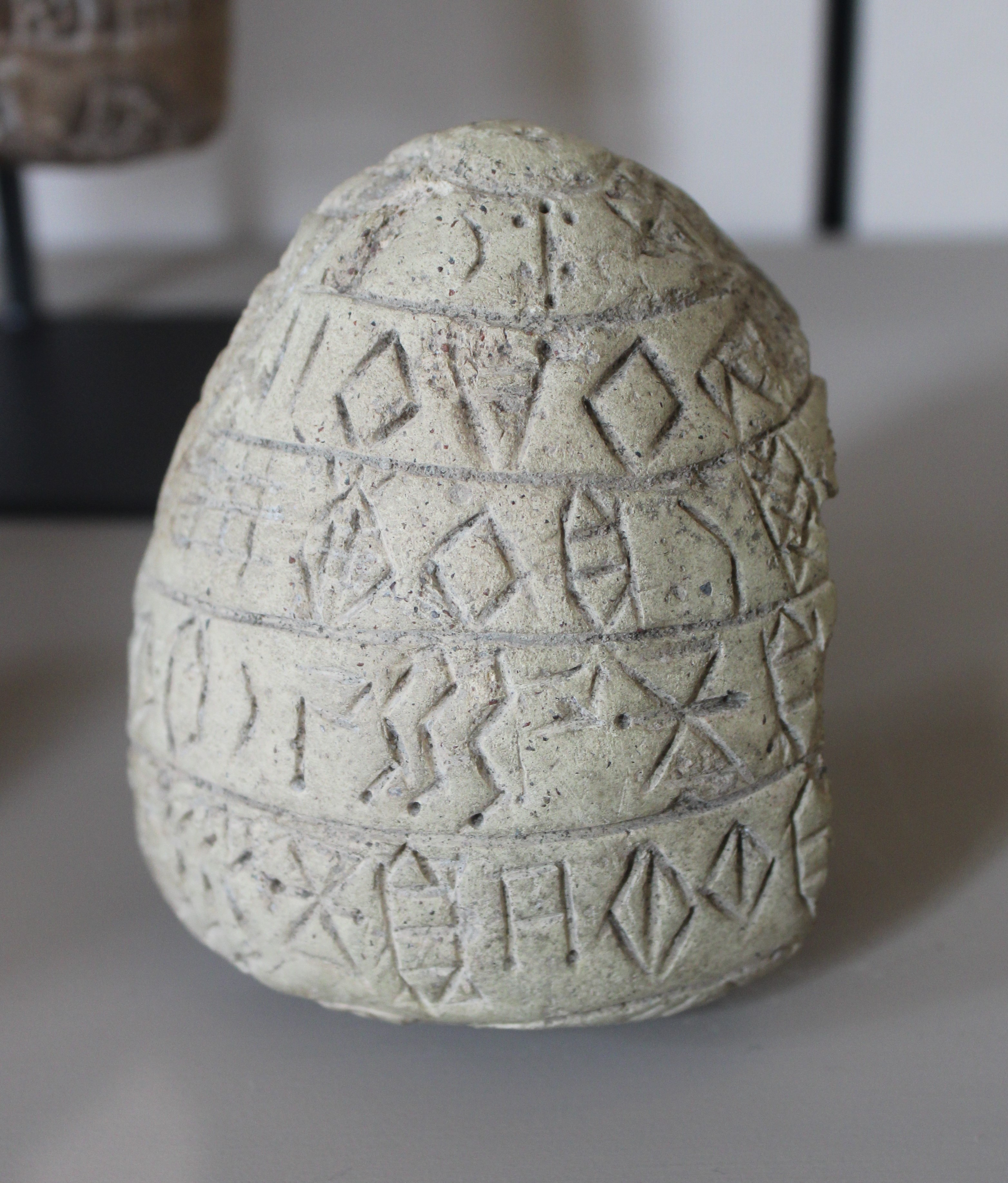
Clay cone with Linear Elamite text. Louvre Museum Sb 17830. Reign of Puzur-Inshushinak.

Preceded by Possibly Hita'a	King of Elam c. 2125 - c. 2110 BC	Succeeded by Position abolished
