= Rimush =

King of Akkad

Rimush 𒌷𒈬𒍑
- King of Kish; King of Sumer; King of the Universe
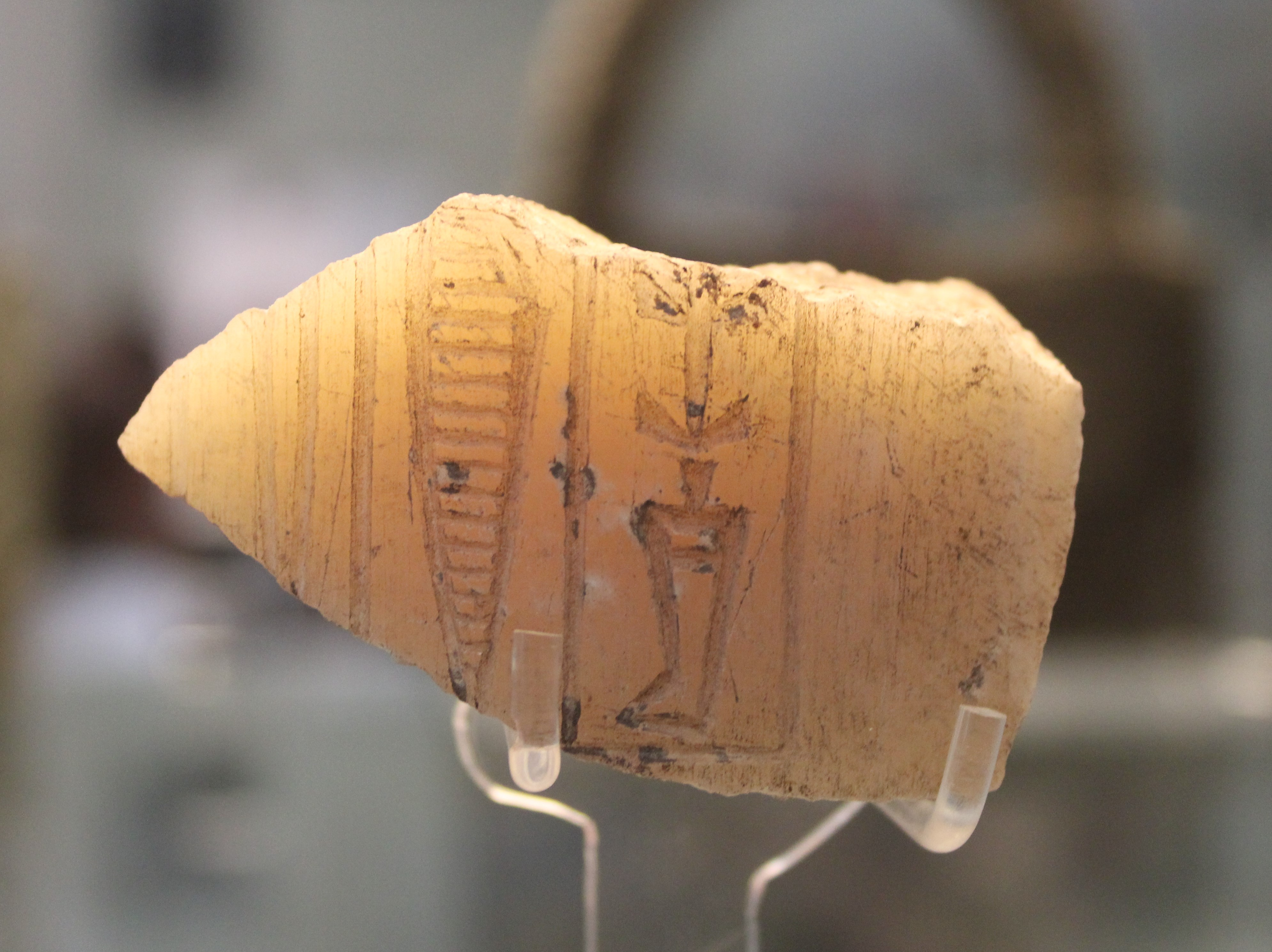
- Stone jar fragment (BM 127340), with inscription mentioning king Rimush of Akkad, c. 2278-2270 BC. Inscription: "Rimush / LUGAL / KISH". From Tell Brak. British Museum

King of Akkad
- Reign: c. 2279 – c. 2270 BC
- Predecessor: Sargon
- Successor: Manishtushu
- Died: c. 2270 BC
- Dynasty: Dynasty of Akkad
- Father: Sargon
- Mother: Tashlultum

Rimush (or Rimuš, 𒌷𒈬𒍑 Ri-mu-uš; died c. 2270 BC) was the second king of the Akkadian Empire. He was the son of Sargon of Akkad. He was brother of Manishtushu, who succeeded him, and an uncle of Naram-Sin of Akkad. Naram-Sin posthumously deified Sargon and Manishtushi but not his uncle. His sister was Enheduana, considered the earliest known named author in world history. Little is known about his brother Shu-Enlil. There was a city, Dur-Rimuš (Fortress of Rimush), located near Tell Ishchali and Khafajah. It was known to be a cult center of the storm god Adad.

== Biography ==
According to the Sumerian King List, his reign lasted nine years (though variant copies read seven or fifteen years). There is one surviving year-name for an unknown year of his reign: mu ud-nun{ki} / adab{ki} hul-a "year in which Adab was destroyed". Tradition gives that he was assassinated, as recorded in the Bārûtu, a compendium of extispicy dated to the first millennium BC: "If the heart is like a testicle—an omen of king Rimuš, whom his courtiers killed with their cylinder seals". He was succeeded by his brother Manishtushu. The Ur III version of the Sumerian King List inverts the order of Rimush and Manishtushu.

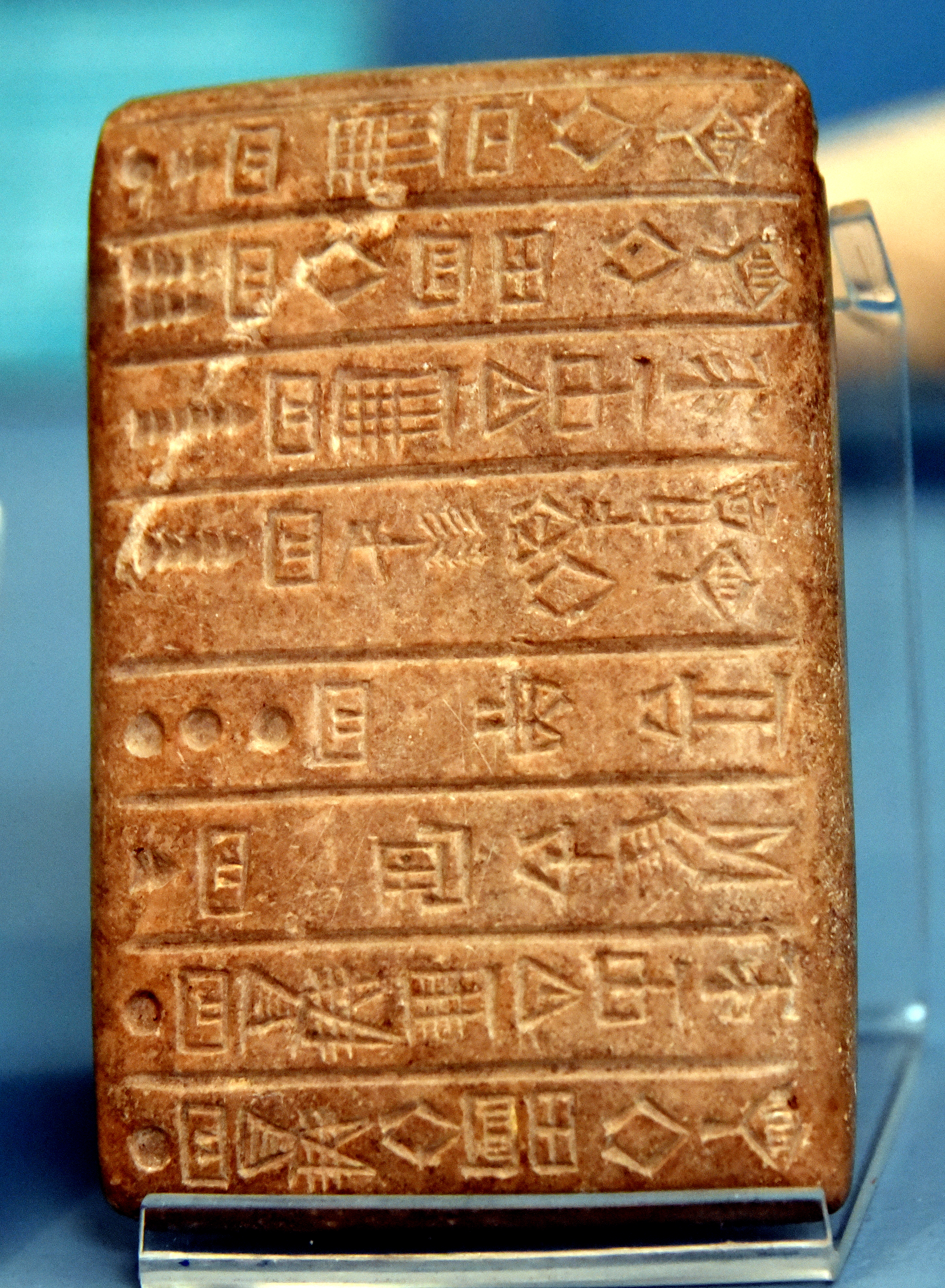
Stone tablet. List of various garments dedicated to the temple of E-ninnu by the Akkadian king Rimush. 23rd century BC. From Nippur, Iraq. Ancient Orient Museum, Istanbul

To some extent, his reign was typical of a ruler of Mesopotamia with proper attention paid to the various deities and their temples. A number of his votive offerings have been found in excavated temples in several Mesopotamian cities including Ur, Sippar, Khafajah, and Brak. After the conquest of Elam, he dedicated 30 mana (a mana was about a half kilogram) of gold, 3,600 mana of copper, and 360 slaves to Enlil, the chief deity of Nippur. Another example of devotional activity was a statue given by Rimush at Nippur (known only from an inscription). The statue's composition is subject to how it is translated. Tin has been suggested, as well as bronze (a tin and copper alloy) as well as meteoric iron.

"[Rimus, king of the world:] [from ancient times n]o one had fashioned a statue (made) of meteoric iron for the god Enlil. (But) Rimus, king of the world, fashioned a statue of himself (made) of meteoric iron Enlil and it (now) stands before the god Enlil. He placed his name at the side of the gods. As for the one who removes this inscription, maygods Enlil and Samas tear out his foundations and destroy his progeny."

Various texts indicated economic activity continued during his reign, despite military activity, which was possibly encompassed by a short period of time.

Akkadian Empire at the time of Rimush

Most of his short reign was taken up consolidating the empire created by his father, Sargon, first ruler of the Akkadian Empire. This empire stretched in the west to Syria in places like Tell Brak and Tell Leilan, to the east in Elam and associated polities in that region, to southern Anatolia in the north, and to the "lower sea" in the south encompassing all the traditional Sumerian powers like Uruk, Ur, and Lagash. All of these political entities had long histories as independent powers and would periodically re-assert their interests throughout the lifetime of the Akkadian Empire.

=== Consolidation of Sumerian cities ===
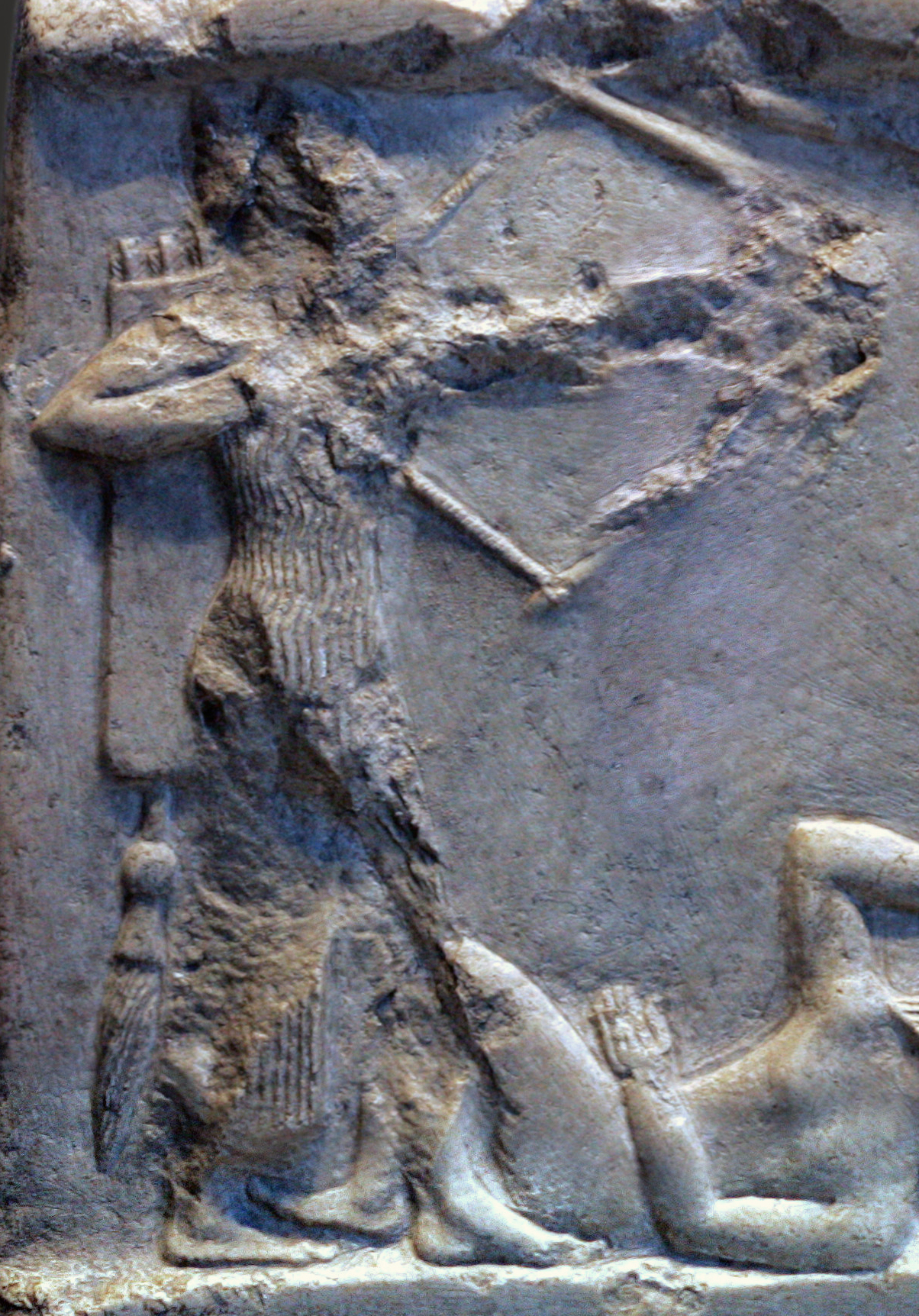
Akkadian archer in tufted garment, indicating a high-ranking official, from the Victory Stele of Rimush

According to his inscriptions, he faced widespread revolts, and had to reconquer the cities of Ur, Umma, Adab, Lagash, Der, KI.AN^{ki}, and Kazallu from rebellious ensis (KI.AN^{ki} is thought to be at the site of Tell Shmet):

"Rimuš, king of the world, in battle over Adab and Zabalam was victorious, and 15,718 men he struck down, and 14,576 captives he took. Further, Meskigala, governor of Adab, he captured, and Lugalgalzu, governor of Zabalam, he captured. He conqu[ered] their two cities [and destroyed the walls of both of them]. [Further], he expelled [so many men from their two cities] and annihilated them. As for the one who removes this inscription], may the [gods] Enlil and Samas [tear out his foundations] and destroy his [pro]geny."

"Rimus, [k]in[g] of the wor[ld], was victor[iou]s over Umma and KI.AN in battle and struck down 8,900 men. He [took] 3,540 captives. Further, he captured En-x, governor of Umma, and Lugal-KA, governor of KI.AN. Further, he conquered their two cities and destroyed the walls of both of them. Further, he expelled 3,600 men from their two cities and annihilated them. As for the one who removes this inscription, may the gods Enlil and [Samas tear out his foundations and destroy his progeny]."

Rimush introduced mass slaughter and large scale destruction of the Sumerian city-states, and maintained meticulous records of his destructions. Most of the major Sumerian cities were destroyed, and Sumerian human losses were enormous: It appears that the city of Shuruppak was spared.

Sumerian casualties from the campaigns of Rimush
| Destroyed cities: | Adab and Zabala | Umma and KI.AN | Ur and Lagash | Kazallu | (Three battles in Sumer) | TOTAL |
| Killed | 15,718 | 8,900 | 8,049 | 12,052 | 11,322 | 56,041 |
| Captured and enslaved | 14,576 | 3,540 | 5,460 | 5,862 | _ | 29,438 |
| "Expelled and annihilated" | _ | 5,600 | 5,985 | _ | 14,100 | 25,685 |

=== Campaigns against Elam and Marhashi ===
There are also records of victorious campaigns against Elam and Marhashi (Sumerian name for the Akkadian "Parahshum") in a longer (CBS 13972 and Ni 3200) and shorter (AO 5476) version. According to the account, troops from (Meluhha) also participated in the conflict: After the victorious campaigns of Rimush, under his successor Manishtushu, Elam would be ruled by Akkadian Military Governors, starting with Eshpum, and Pashime, on the Iranian coast, was ruled by an Akkadian Governor named Ilshu-rabi. IN another version of the text Rimush is called "king of Kish" like his father.

"<Rimus, king of the world, in battle> was victorious over Abalgamas, king of Parahsum. Zahar, Elam, [G]upin, and [Me]luhha assembled in Pa[rah]sum for battle, but he, (Rimus) captured S[idga'u], general of [Parahsum] (and) [the king(?) of] Elam i[nbetwe]en (the cities of) [Aw]an and [Susa], by the '[Mid]dle Ri[ver]'. [Further], he [h]eaped up over [them] a [burial mo]und i[n] the [are]a of the city. In addition, he tore out the [fo]undation of Parahsum from the land of Elam and (thereby) Rimus, king of the world, rule[d] Elam. The god Enlil showed (him the way). By the gods [Samas] and [Ilaba] I swe[ar] that (these) are not falsehoods, (but) are indeed [t]ru[e]. As for the o[ne who] re[moves this inscription, may the gods Enlil and Sam]as [te]ar out [his] foundation] an [dest]roy [his progeny]. Caption - Diorite, dusu-stone and (various) stones which I took ... as booty of Parahsum."

==== Inscriptions of Elamite campaign ====
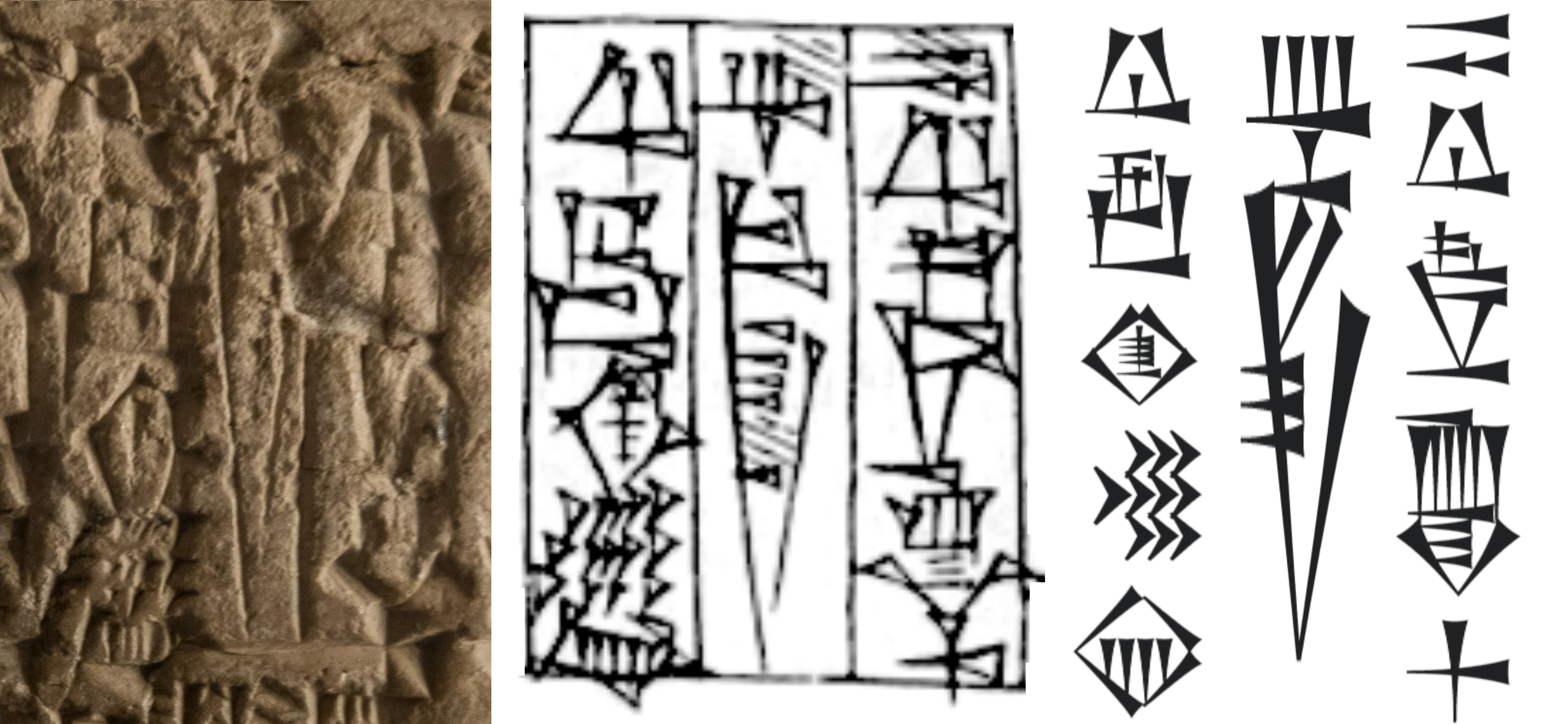
"Abalgamash, King of Marhashi" (𒀀𒁀𒀠𒂵𒈦 𒈗 𒁀𒊏𒄴𒋳𒆠 Abalgamash Lugal Paraahshum-ki) on Rimush inscription (Louvre, AO 5476)

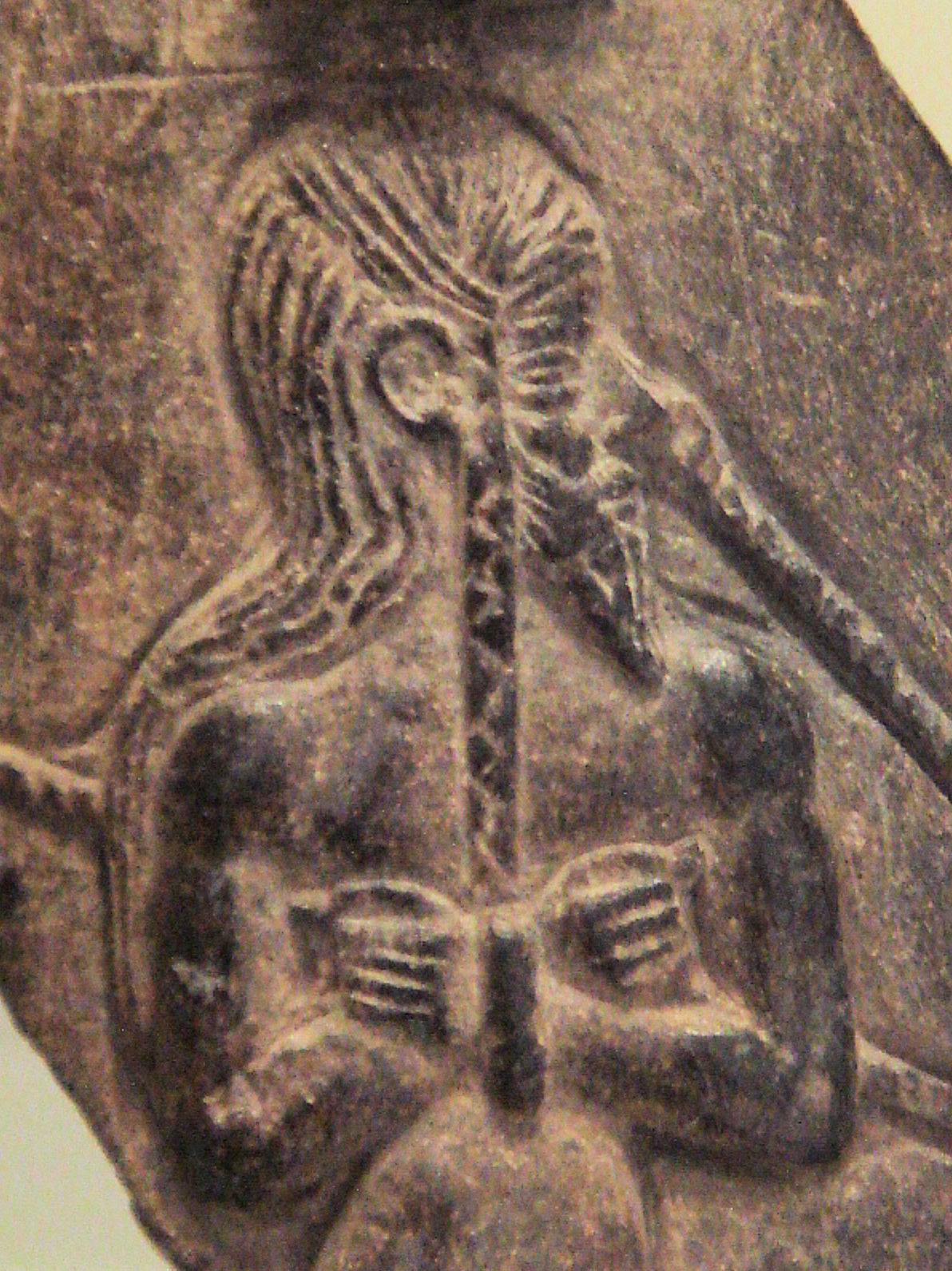
Prisoner of the Akkadian Empire, nude, fettered, drawn by nose ring, with pointed beard and vertical braid. 2350-2000 BC, Louvre Museum AO 5683.

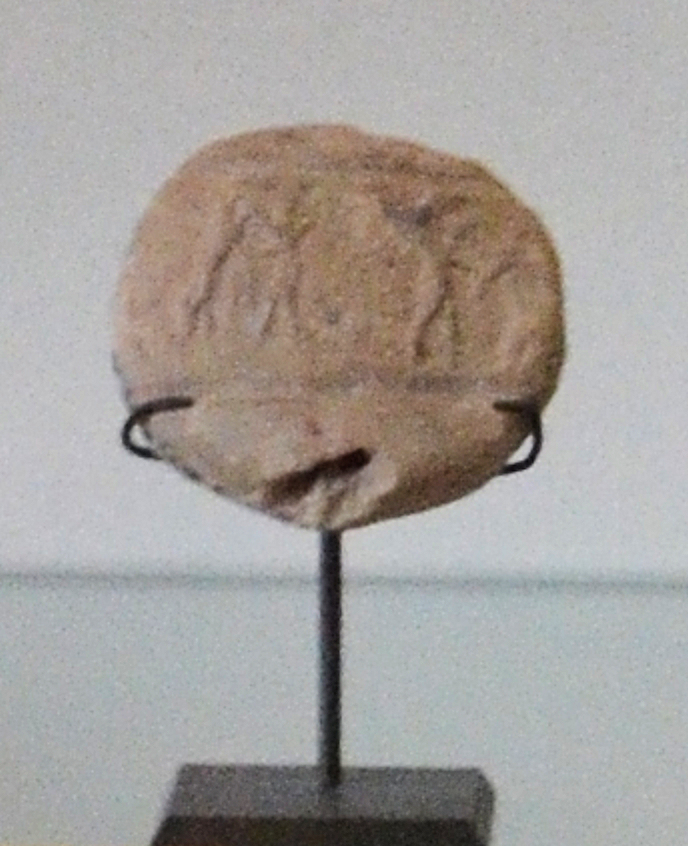
Seal impression of Liburbeli in the service of Epirmupi Governor of Elam and vassal of Rimush and Manishtushu

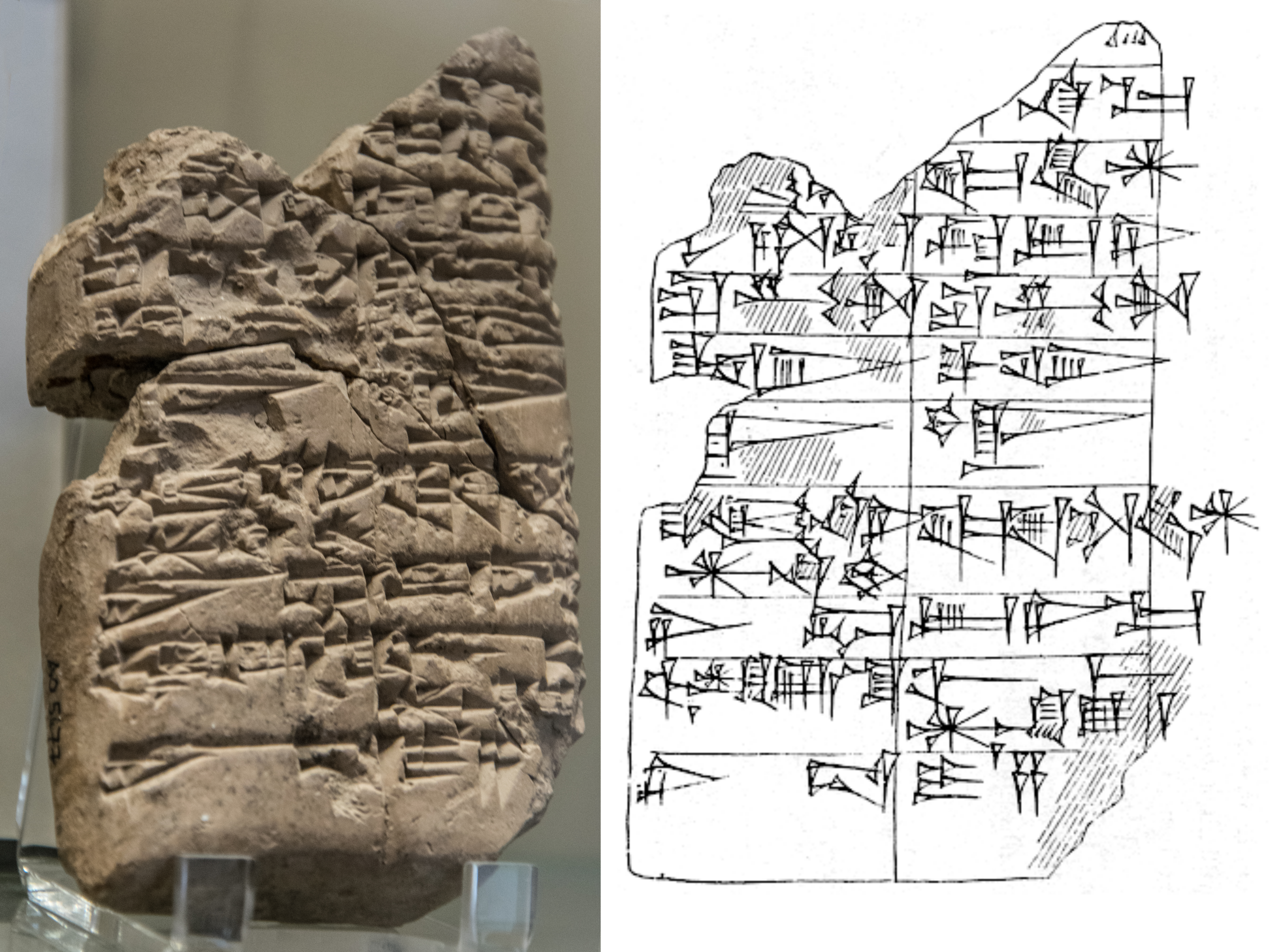
Image and transcription of shorter version, AO 5476

== Victory Stele of Rimush over Lagash ==
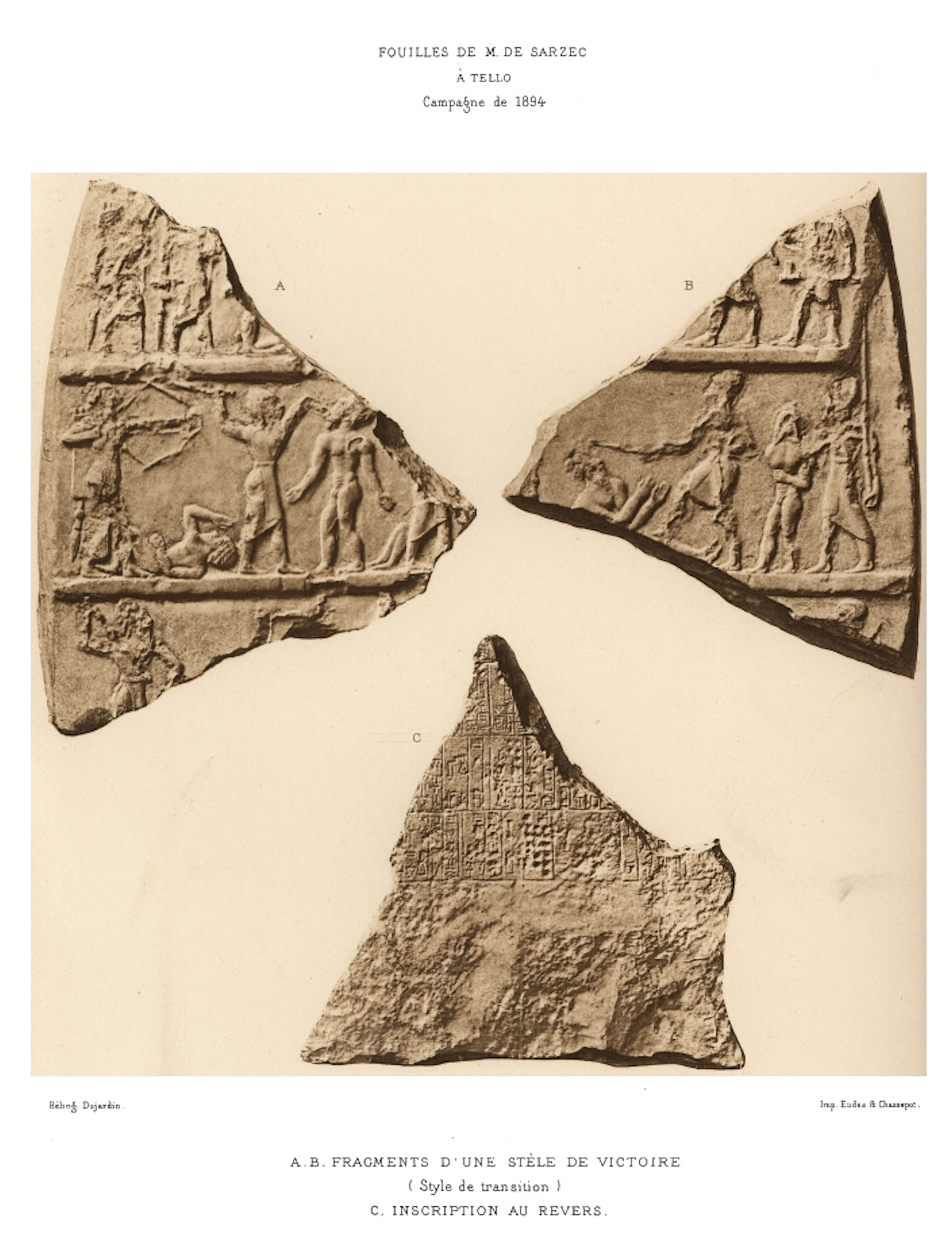
Fragments of the Victory Stele of Rimush. The Victory Stele also has an epigraphic fragment, mentioning Akkad and Lagash. It suggests the stele represents the defeat of Lagash by the troops of Akkad.

A Victory Stele in several fragments, possibly three in total. Two (found in Tell K at Girsu) are in the Louvre Museum, AO 2678 (34 cm high, 28 cm wide) for the relief and AO 2679 (9 cm high, 26 cm wide) for the inscriptions are generally thought to be part of the same stele, though this is not certain. The inscription is much damaged and the only readable portion of AO 2679 not pertaining to land distribution reads "after Akkade received the kingship". Another fragment, of unknown provenance but thought to be from the Lagash region, from the Yale Babylonian Collection YBC 2409 (20 cm high, 21 cm wide, 12 cm deep) has been proposed as a join to the first two but this is in dispute. The stele has been attributed to Rimush on stylistic and epigraphical grounds but this is also in dispute with a counter proposal dating it to the time of Naram-Sin. One of the fragments mentions Akkad and Lagash. One fragment in the main inscription probably contains parts of the name of Rimush himself.

It is thought that the stele represents the defeat of Lagash by the troops of Akkad. The prisoners depicted in the relief are visibly Mesopotamian, and their slaughtering at the hand of Akkadian soldiers is consistent with the known accounts of Rimush. The stele was excavated in ancient Girsu, one of the main cities of the territory of Lagash. The inscription acts as a land kudurru and describes the attribution of large plots of land (totaling an area of about 40 kilometers by 40 kilometers) from Lagash to the Akkadian nobility, following the victory. Almost all the personal names in the inscription are known from the Lagash and Girsu areas.

=== Fragments from stele ===
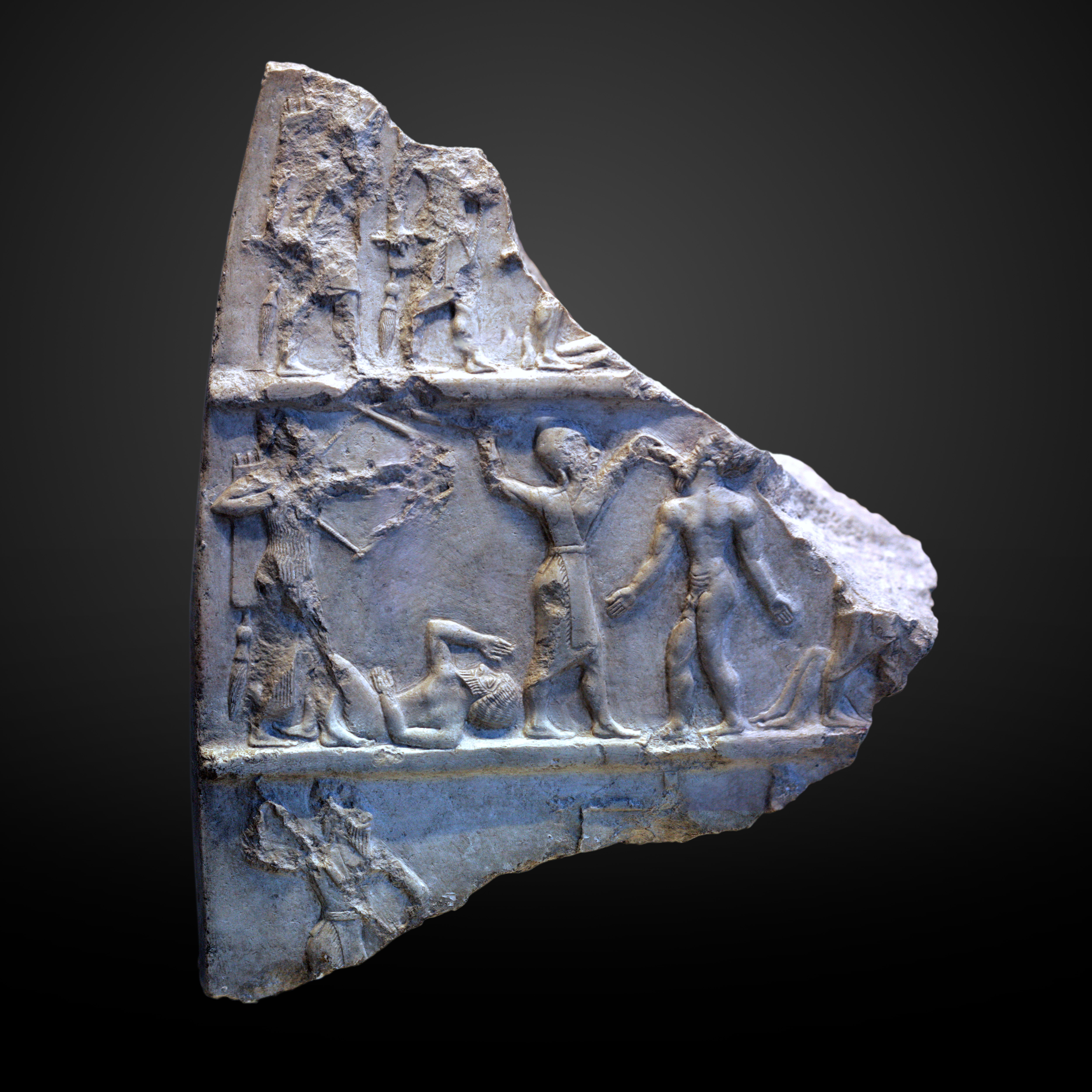
Possible victory stele of king Rimush (front) (Louvre AO 2678).

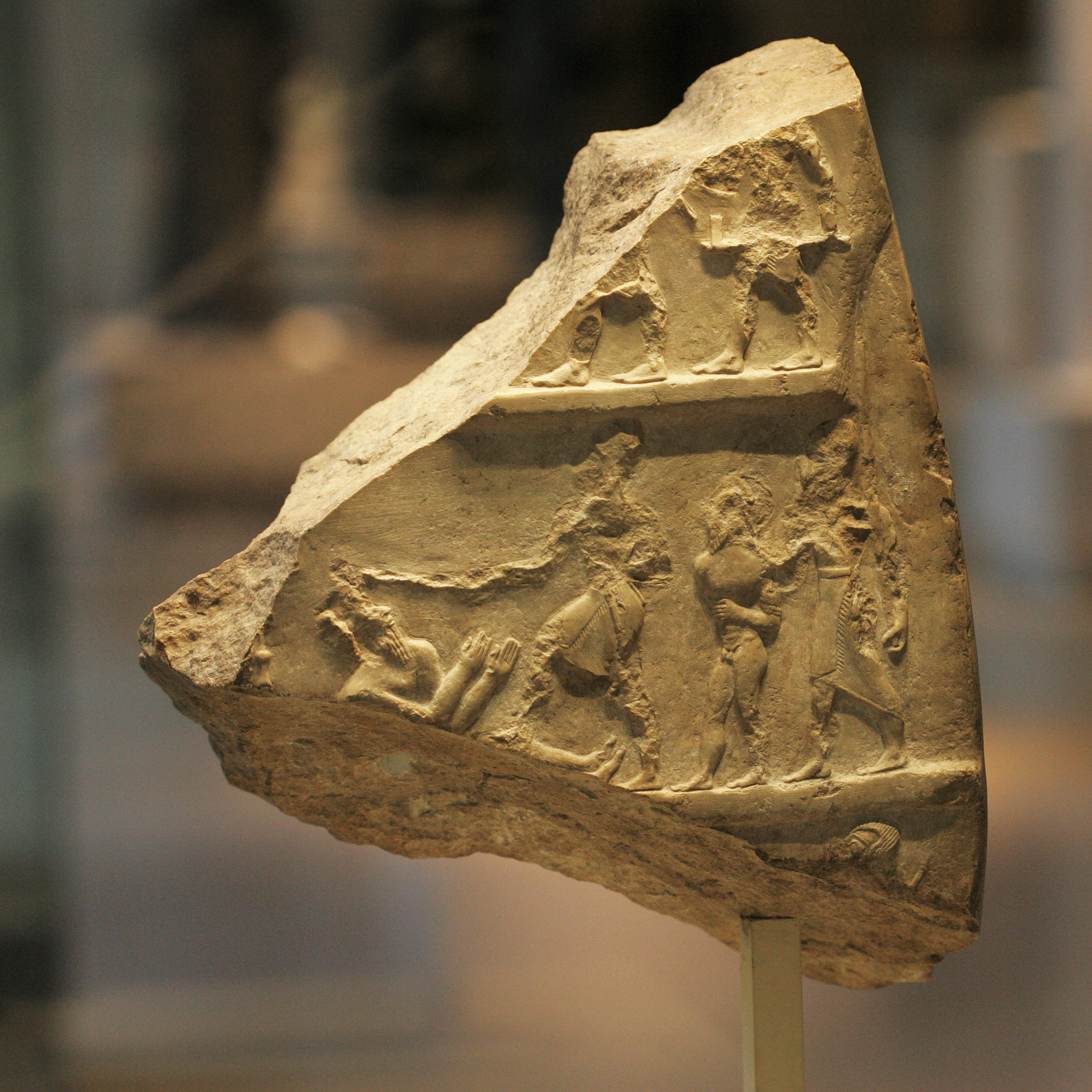
Possible victory stele of king Rimush (back) (Louvre AO 2678)

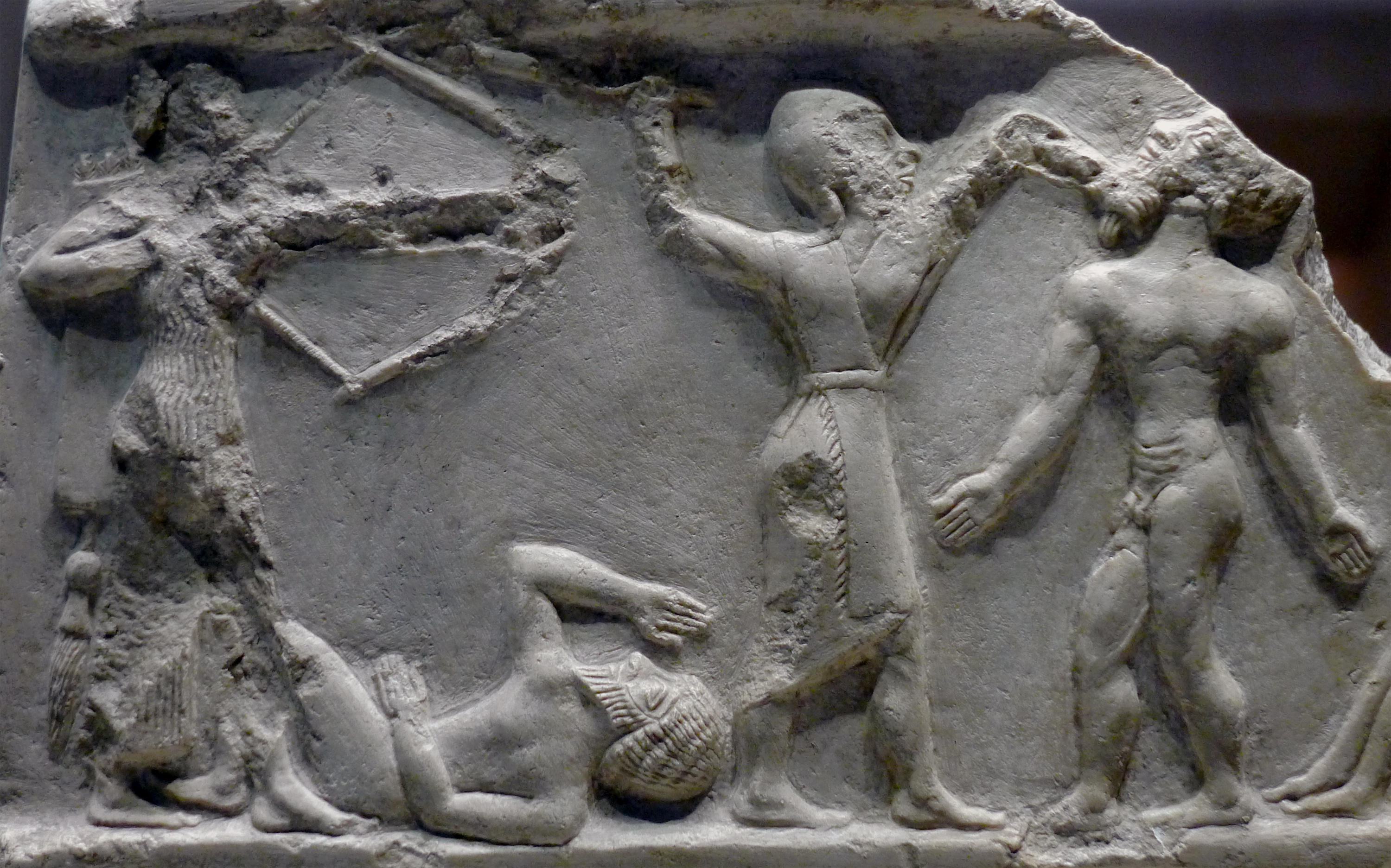
Detail of the killing of prisoners by Akkadian troops. (Louvre AO 2678)

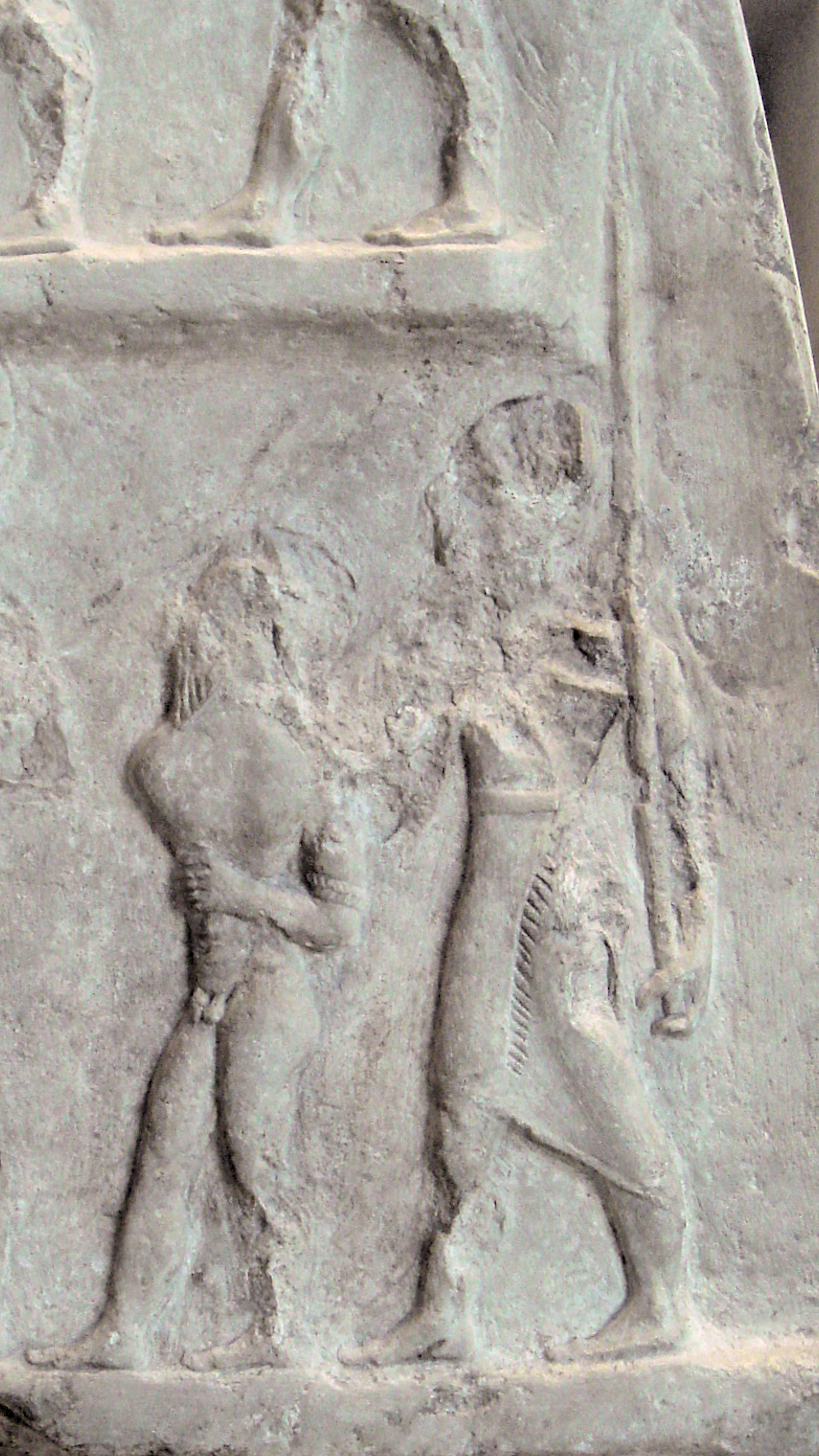
Detail of a soldier escorting a prisoner (Louvre AO 2678)

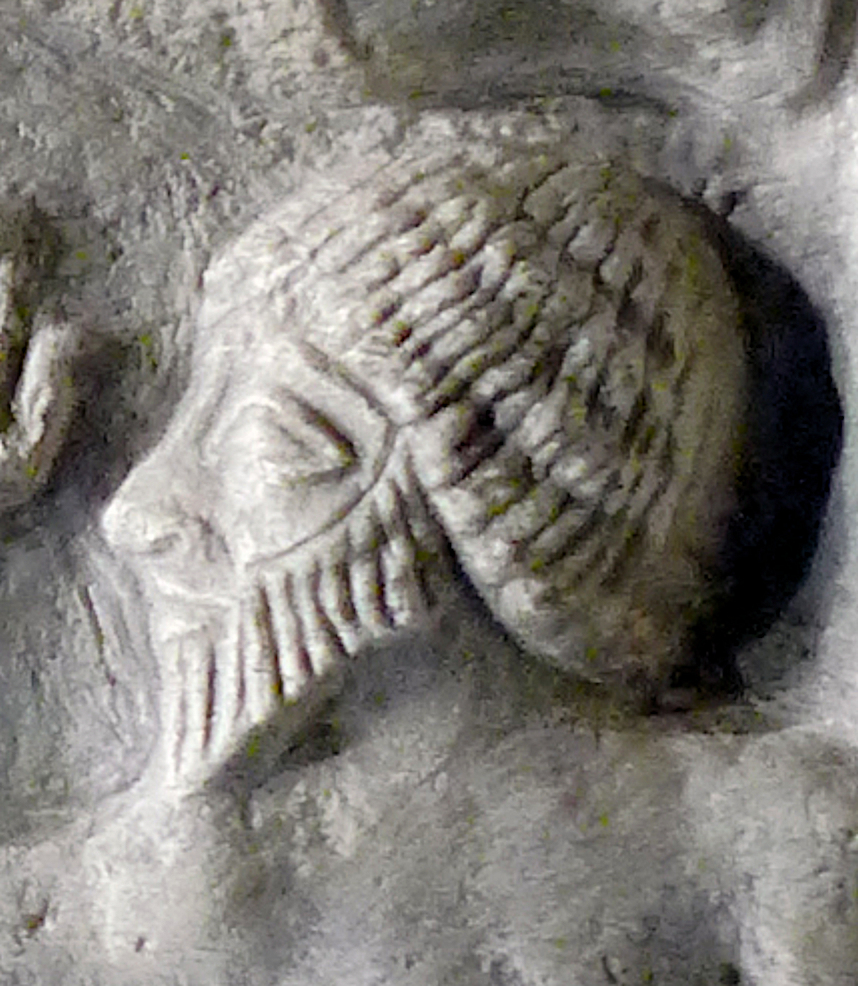
A prisoner from Lagash on the Victory Stele. The same hairstyle can be seen in other statues from Lagash.

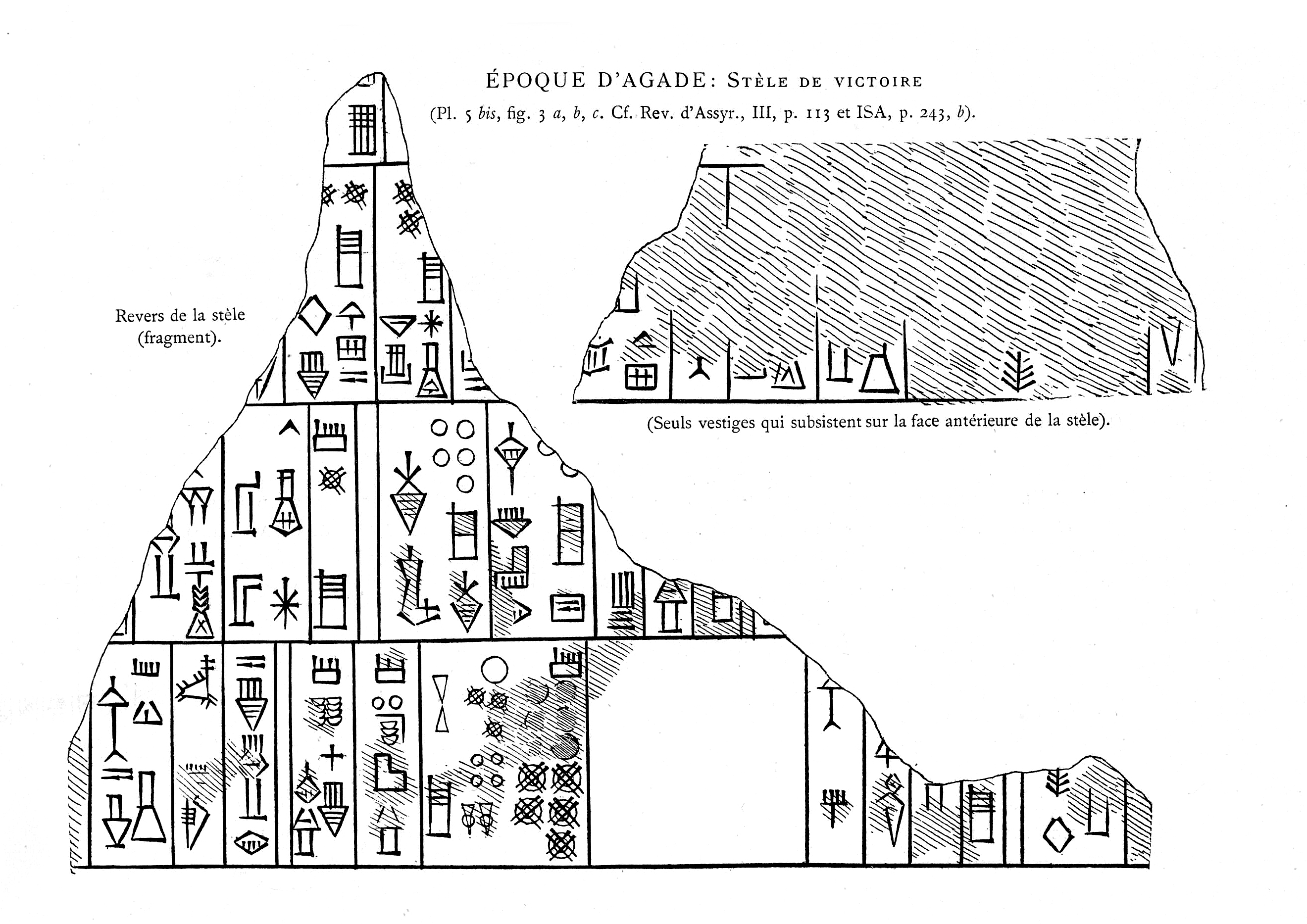
Fragment mentioning Akkad and Lagash (Louvre AO 2679)

== Artifacts in the name of Rimush ==
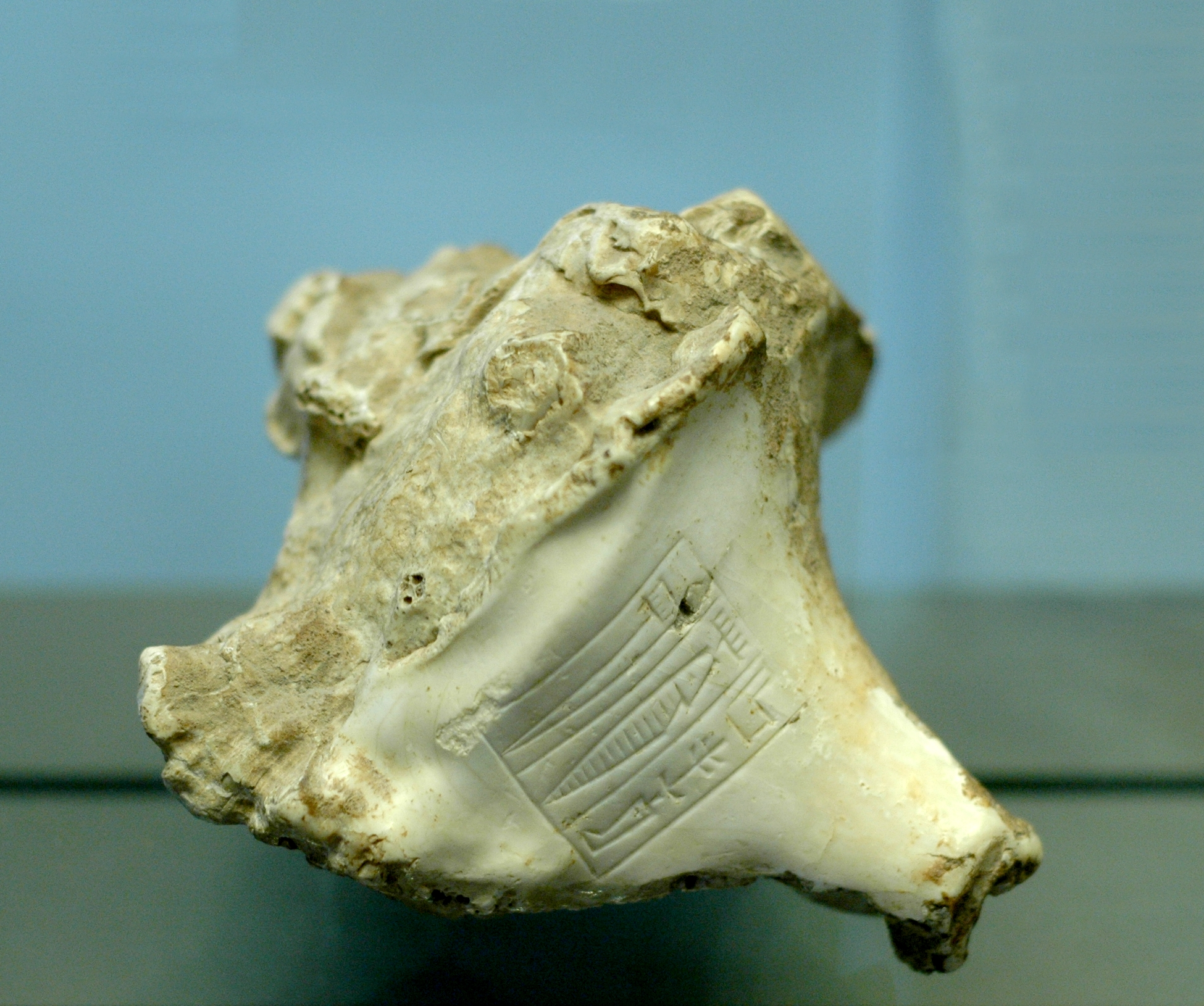
Akkadian language cuneiform on Murex shell, with name of Rimush (Louvre AO21404)

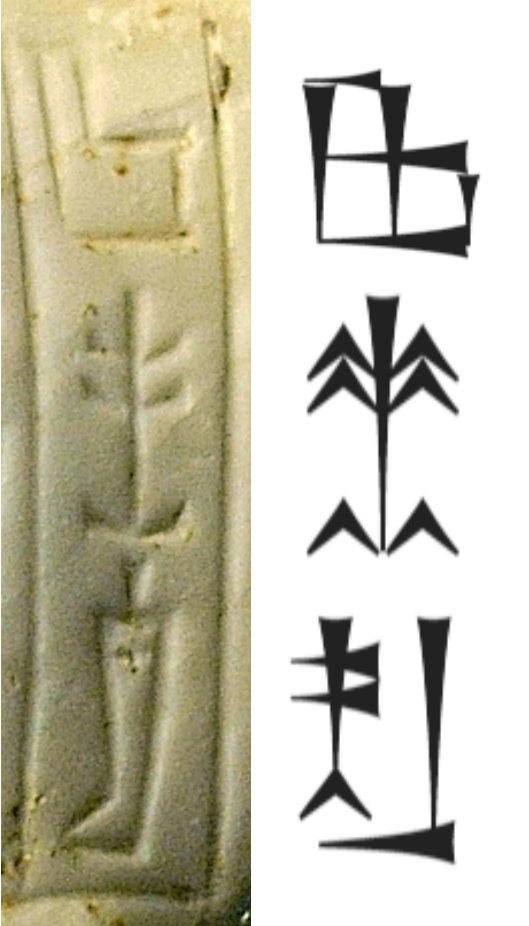
Detail of Rimush inscription.(Louvre AO21404)

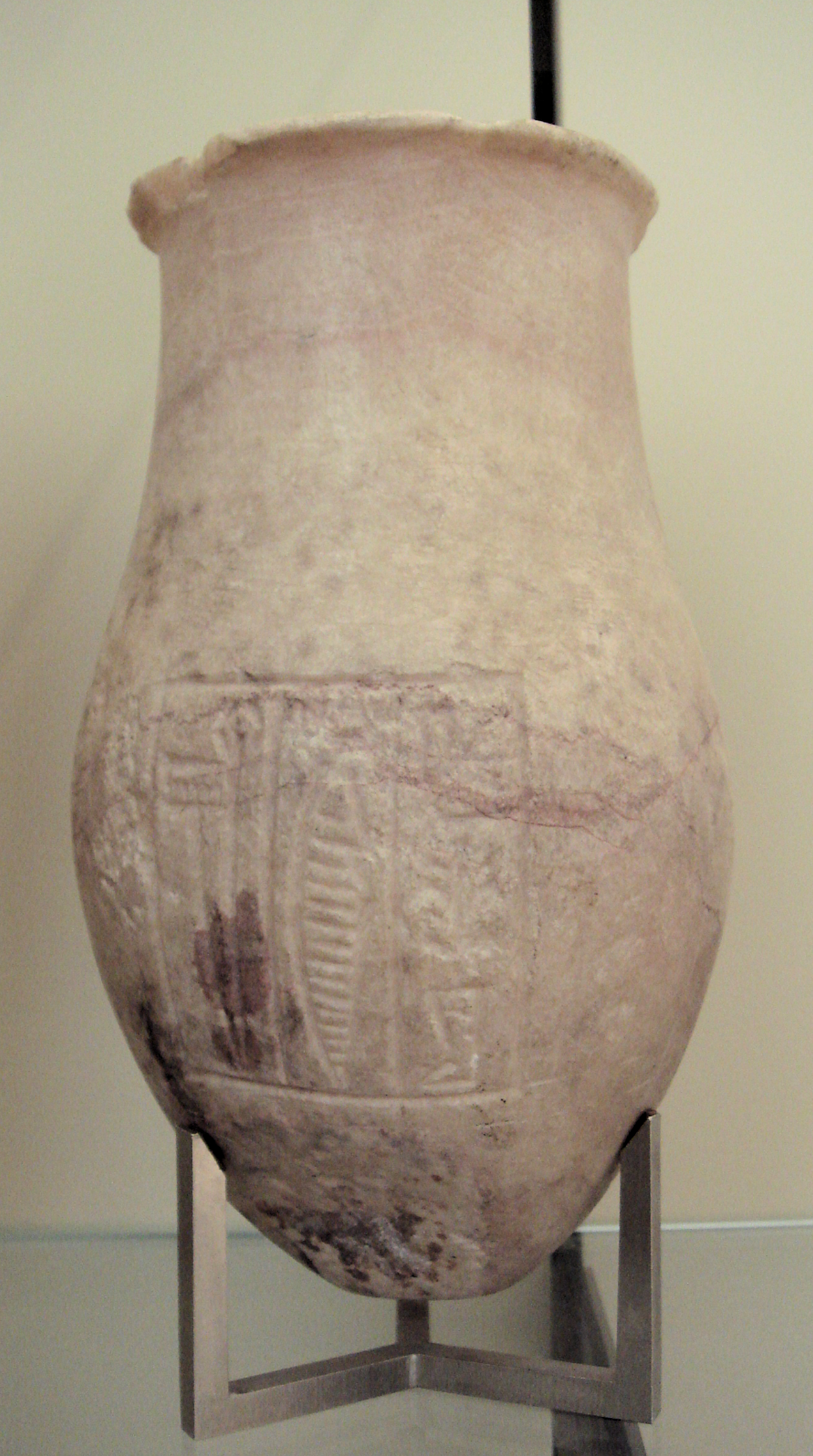
Vase in the name of "Rimush, King of Kish", albaster, Tello ancient Girsu.

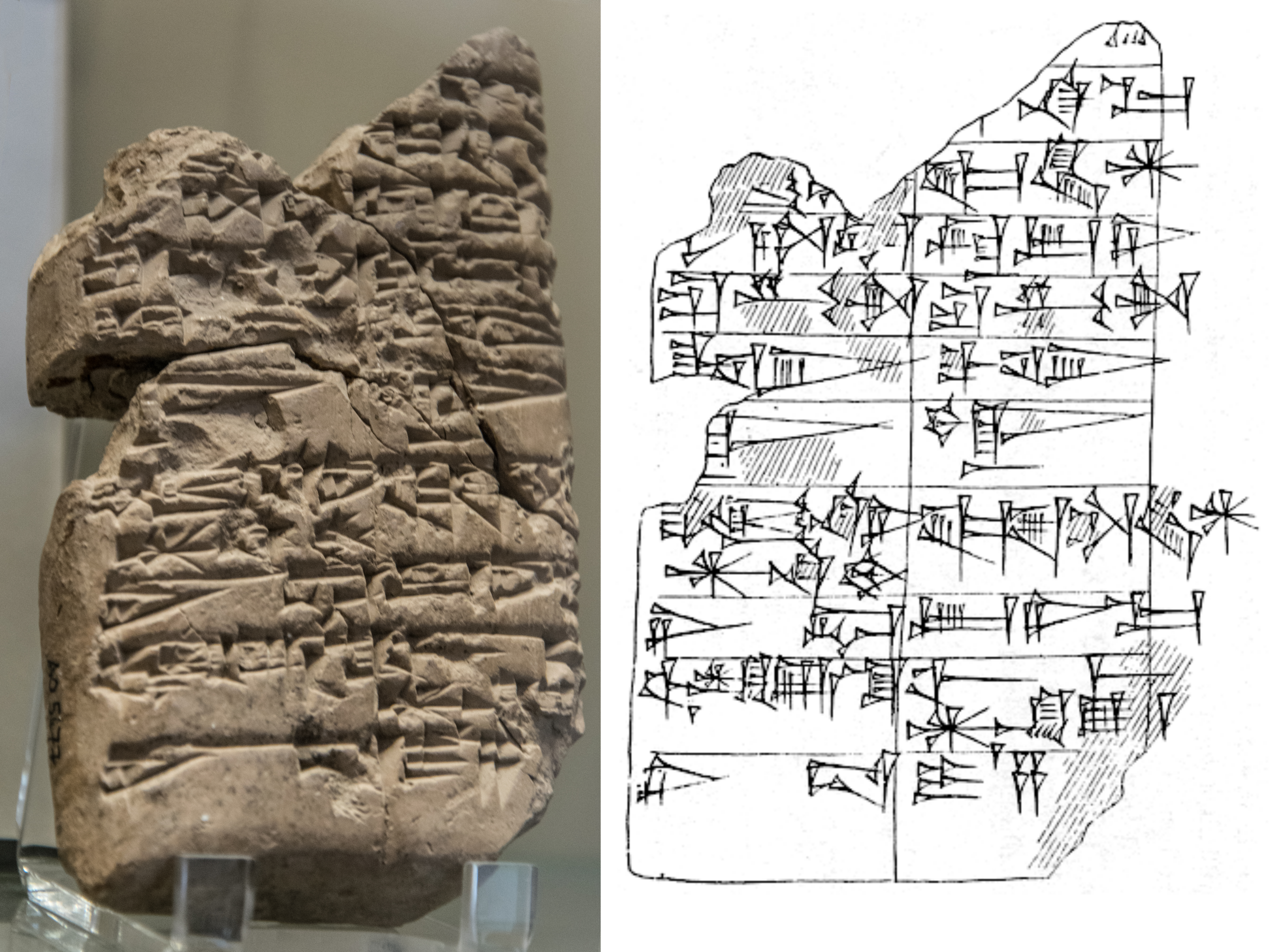
The first known Sumerian-Akkadian bilingual tablet dates from the reign of Rimush. Top column is in Sumerian and bottom column is its translation in Akkadian. (Louvre AO 5477)

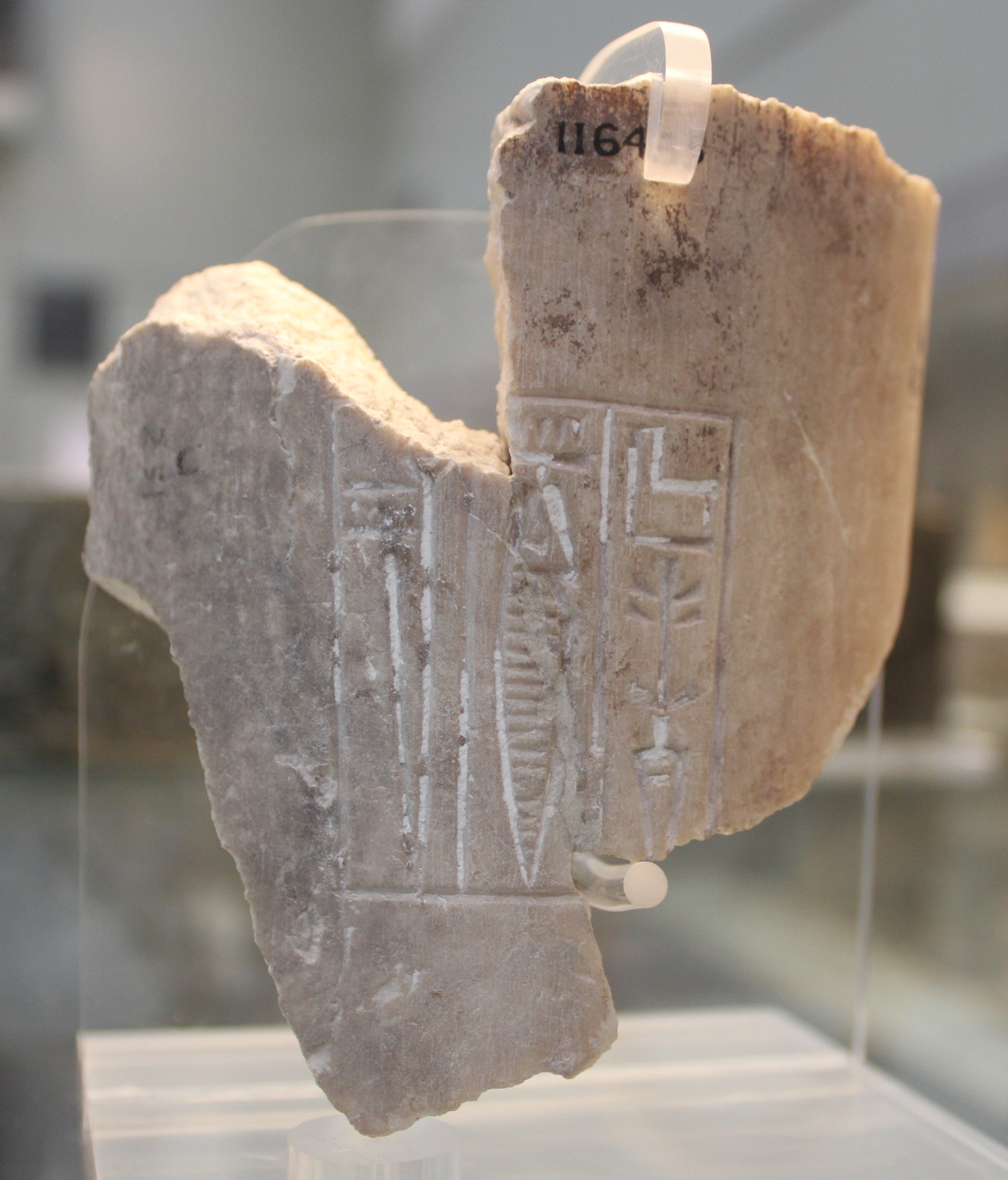
Jar fragment of Rimush (Ur 116435)

== See also ==
- History of Sumer
- List of Mesopotamian dynasties
- List of kings of Akkad

Regnal titles
| Preceded by Sargon of Akkad | King of Akkad c. 2279 – c. 2270 BC | Succeeded by Manishtushu |
| Preceded by Sargon of Akkad | King of Kish, Uruk, Lagash, and Umma c. 2279 – c. 2270 BC | Succeeded by Manishtushu |
| Preceded by Luh-ishan of Awan | Overlord of Elam c. 2279 – c. 2270 BC | Succeeded by Manishtushu |
