= Marhasi =

Ancient Near Eastern Kingdom

Marhasi
𒈥𒄩𒅆𒆠
Possible location of Marhasi, to the east of Sumer and Elam.

Marhaši (Sumerian: Mar-ḫa-ši^{Ki} 𒈥𒄩𒅆𒆠, Marhashi, Marhasi, Parhasi, Barhasi; in earlier sources Waraḫše) was an important ancient Near East polity situated in the region near Elam. It is generally assumed, though not certain, that the Paraḫšum/Baraḫšum (𒁀𒊏𒄴𒋧𒆠 pa2-ra-ah-shum2-ki) of the Akkadian Empire period referred to Marhaši. This equivalence has been challenged. It is known from 3rd millennium BC and early 2nd millennium BC Mesopotamian sources. Its precise location has not been identified but the current thinking places it on the eastern side of the Iranian plateau.

The language of Marhaši is considered to be different from that of Simaški, and only minimally Elamite-related. Marhaši is known to have been the source of a number exotic trade goods for Mesopotamia including the "bear of Marhaši". Other trade goods were lapis lazuli and carnelian. One lexical list includes a mention of "Carnelian which is speckled with yellow, Marḫaši Carnelian is its name".

== History ==
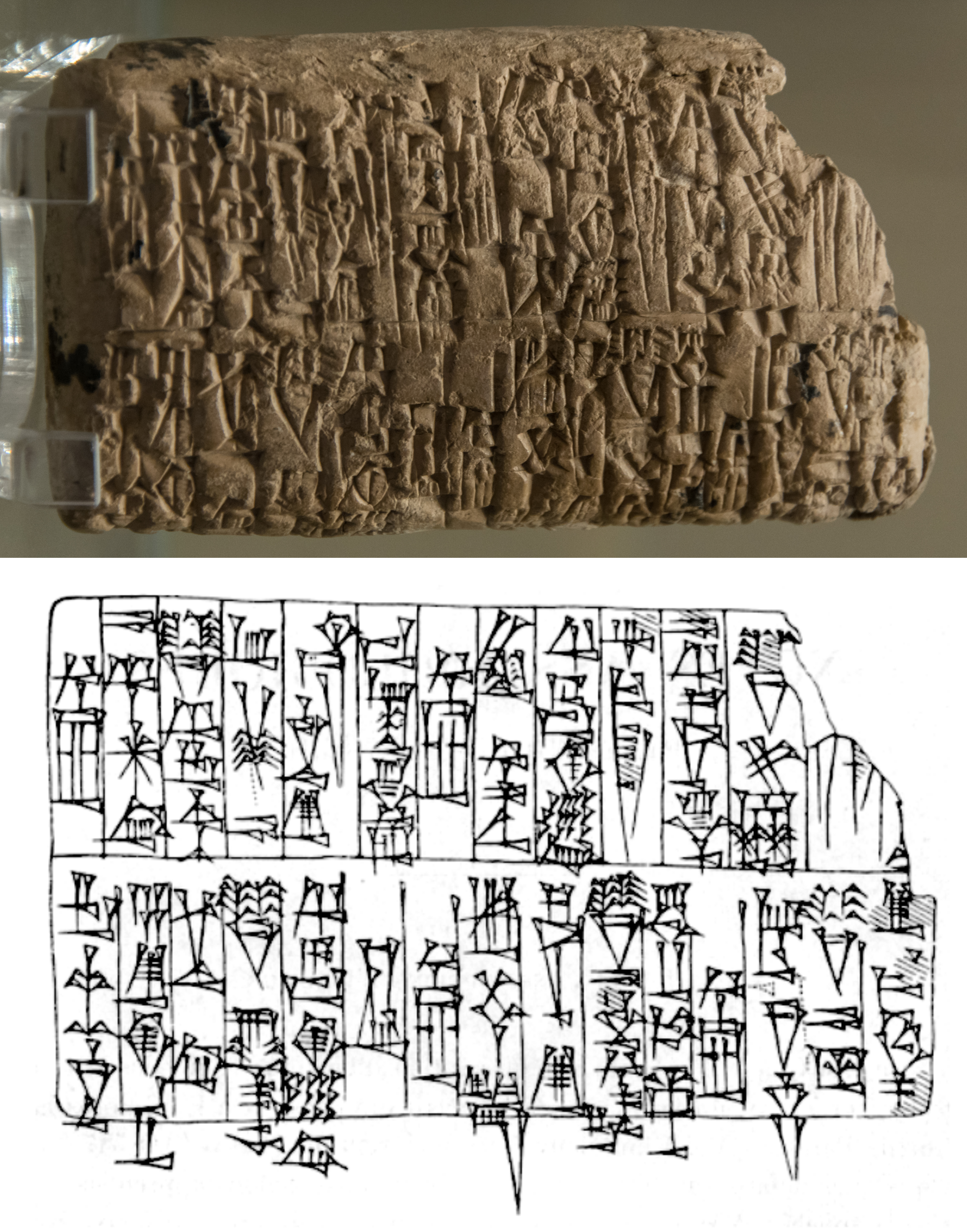
Account of the victories of Rimush, king of Akkad, over Abalgamash, king of Marhaši, and upon Elamite cities. Louvre Museum AO5476. In several inscriptions, Rimush described his conquest of Elam and Marhashi far to the east of Sumer, even mentioning victories over troops of Meluhha.

Assuming the equivalence between Paraḫšum/Baraḫšum and Marhaši is correct, Marhaši was mentioned by two Akkadian Empire rulers. The empire's founder Sargon the Great took the title "conqueror of Elam and Parahsum". In inscriptions celebrating his military victories in the east are mentioned "Ulu[l], gene[ral] of Parahsum", "Dagu, brother of the kin[g] of Parahsum", "Sidga'u, general of Parahsum", and "Kundupum, judge of Parahsum". After a rebellion the second ruler of Akkad, Rimush, reported defeating king Abalgamash of Paraḫšum and capturing his general Sidgau saying "Zahara and Elam had assembled in Paraḫšum for battle, but he (Rimus) was victorious (over them) and struck down 16,212 men (and) took 4,216 captives". In the aftermath, "he conquered the cities of Elam, destroyed their walls, and tore out the foundations of Paraḫšum [from the land of Elam]". The battle took place "in [betwe]en (the cities of) [Aw]an and [Susa], by the [Mid]dle Ri[ver]". The booty of this victory included "Diorite, dusu-stone and (various) stones which I took ... as booty of Paraḫšum". A number of bowls and vases were found in Nippur inscribed that they were booty from Paraḫšum, dedicated to the god Enlil. Akkadian empire ruler Naram-Sin took as a title "commander of all the land of Elam, as far as Paraḫšum, and the land of [S]ubartum as far as the Cedar Forest".

King Shulgi of the Ur-III dynasty gave his daughter Liwwir-mittašu, in marriage to the king of Marhaši in his 18th year "Year Liwwir-mittašu the king's daughter was elevated to the ladyship in Marhaši". One of the generals (šagina) of Shulgi's successor Amar-Sin, a Habruša, is attested as leading "troops from Marhaši" in Amar-Sin's 5th regnal year. The final Ur III ruler, Ibbi-Sin, in a text reports fashioning for the god Nanna "an image of a Meluhhan speckled "dog" that had been brought to him as tribute from Marhasi. He [dedicated (it) for [h]is (own) life. The name of that speckled "dog" (is): "May he catch (the enemy)". In one Ur III text a "Libanašgubi, messenger of Libanukšabaš, governor of Marhaši" is listed. Another text notes that a royal gift was brought by one Banana a "man of Marhashi".

Hammurabi of Babylonia's 30th year name was

"Year Hammurabi the king, the mighty, the beloved of Marduk, drove away with the supreme power of the great gods the army of Elam who had gathered from the border of Marhaši, Subartu, Gutium, Tupliash (Eshnunna) and Malgium who had come up in multitudes, and having defeated them in one campaign, he (Hammurabi) secured the foundations of Sumer and Akkad."

On a fragment from a statue of Kurigalzu II found at Susa, thought to be part of the booty from the Elamite raid of Mesopotamia under ruler Kidin-Hutran (c. 1224 BC), was found the inscription "Kurigalzu, the king of the universe, who has struck Susa and Elam as far as the border of [Mar]ḫaši". The mention of Marhaši is an anachronism, typical in Kassite inscriptions, cribbed from Akkadian Empire texts.

The name Marḫaši may appear in a damaged tablet where it designates an area to the north and east conquered by Neo-Babylonian Empire ruler Nebuchadrezzar II (605–562 BC) though that restoration is uncertain.

== In literary tradition ==
In the purely literary Sumerian text The Cursing of Akkad, composed during the later Ur III period and which blamed the fall of civilization on the Akkadian Empire, it lists one of the benefits of having the blessing of Inanna: "That even Marhaši would be reentered on the (tribute) rolls".

In the much later Sumerian literary composition Great Revolt against Naram-Sin one of the many kings who revolted against him was a Hubshumkibi of Marhaši.

In the Sumerian royal hymn for Ishbi-Erra (c. 2017— 1986 BC) ruler of the city-state Isin in the Isin-Larsa period it states "From Basime on the sea-coast (...) to the border of; from Urua, the bolt of Elam (...) to the border of Marhaäi" as being the territory of Šimaški ruler Kindattu, where Urua - Marhasi defines an east–west axis and Bašime (Pashime) - Zabsali defines a south to north axis. Pašime is now know to be at the site of Tell Abu Sheeja.

In a much later Old Babylonian period Sumerian literary composition the Early Dynastic period Lugal-Anne-Mundu of Adab mentions Marhaši among the seven provinces of his empire, between the names of Elam and Gutium: "the Cedar Mountains, Elam, Marḫaši, Gutium, Subartu, Amurru, Sutium, or the Eanna Mountain". The composition also states that he confronted Migir-Enlil, the governor (ensi) of Marhashi, who had led a coalition of 13 rebel chiefs against him.

In the fragmentary early 2nd millennium BC Sumerian myth text Enki and the World Order, the god Enki rebuilds the world after a catastrophe. It includes the phrase "He cleansed and purified the land of Dilmun. He placed Ninsikila in charge of it. He gave ...... for the fish spawn, ate its ...... fish, bestowed palms on the cultivated land, ate its dates. ...... Elam and Marhaci ....... ...... to devour ....... The king endowed with strength by Enlil destroyed their houses, demolished (?) their walls. He brought their silver and lapis-lazuli, their treasure, to Enlil, king of all the lands, in Nibru"

== Location ==
Early on Marhaši was speculated to be east of the Diyala river and in the mountains northwest or north of Elam. This was based on an inscription of a little known early Old Babylonian period ruler of Der, Ilum-muttabbil, who claimed defeating the armies of, Anshan, Elam, and Simaski, in alliance with Marhaši.

In modern scholarship, Marhasi is generally placed in the eastern highlands beyond Elam, roughly corresponding to present-day southeastern Iran, acting as an intermediate region between Mesopotamia and Meluhha to the east.

== Rulers of Marhaši ==
The main rulers known from inscriptions are:

1. Abalgamash (revolted against Rimush, king of Akkad)
2. Hupšumkipi (contemporary with Naram-Sin of Akkad)
3. Hashibatal (contemporary with Shulgi king of Ur)
4. Arwilukpi (contemporary with Amar-Sin king of Ur)
5. Libanu-ugšabaš (contemporary with Amar-Sin king of Ur)

== Artifacts ==
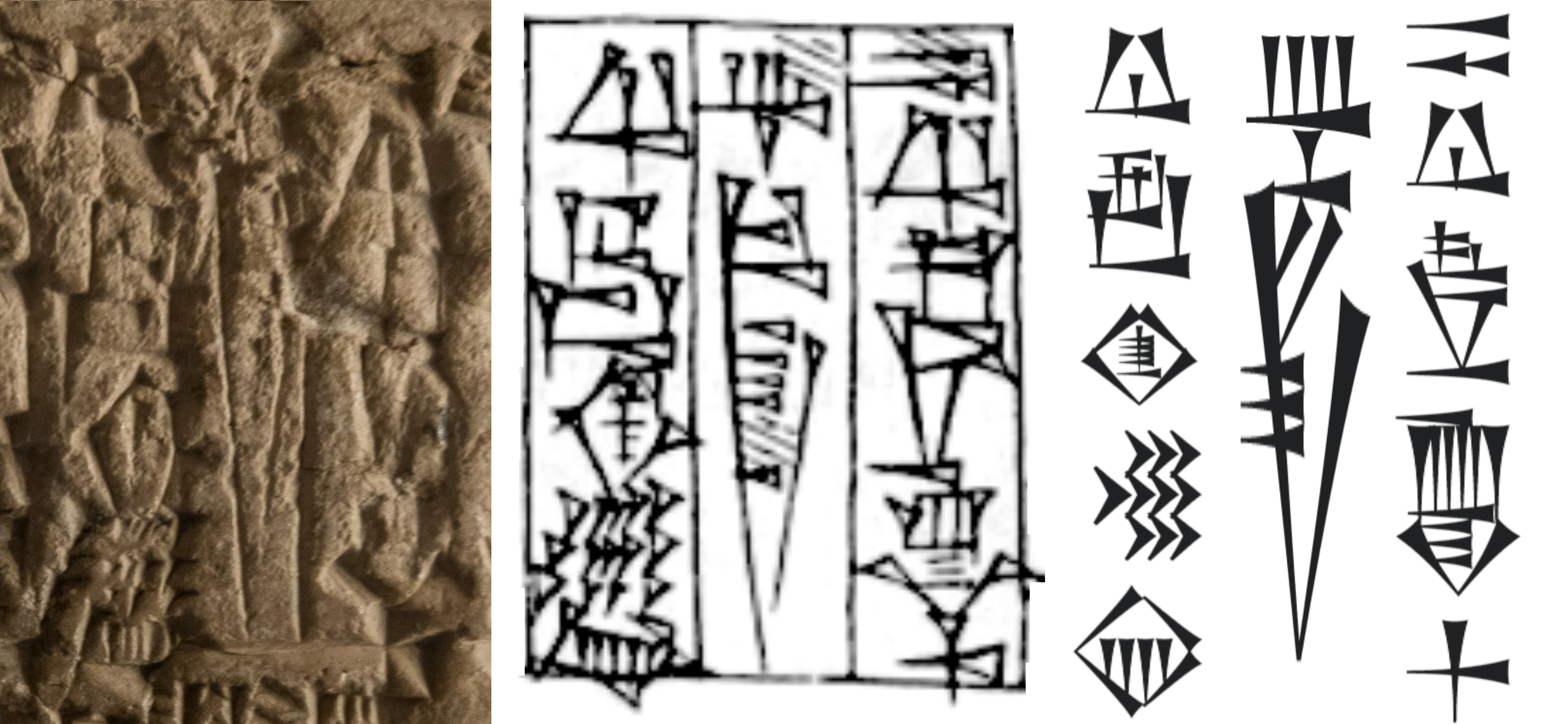
"Abalgamash, King of Marhashi" (𒀀𒁀𒀠𒂵𒈦 𒈗 𒁀𒊏𒄴𒋳𒆠 Abalgamash Lugal Paraahshum-ki) on one of the Rimush inscriptions (Louvre Museum, AO 5476)

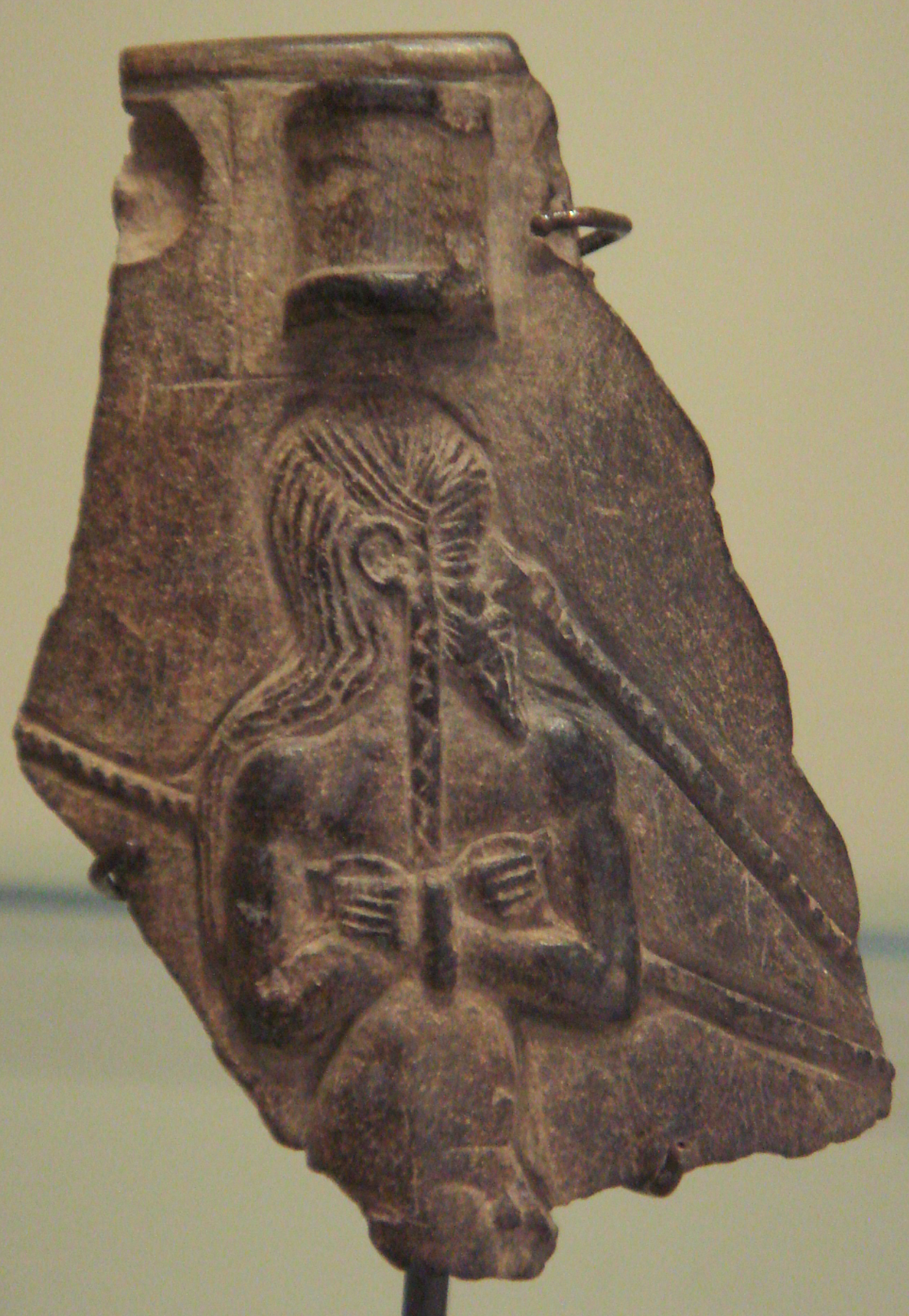
Prisoner of the Akkadian Empire, nude, fettered, drawn by nose ring, with pointed beard and vertical braid. Fragment of a vase possibly from Warka, ancient Uruk. Louvre museum.

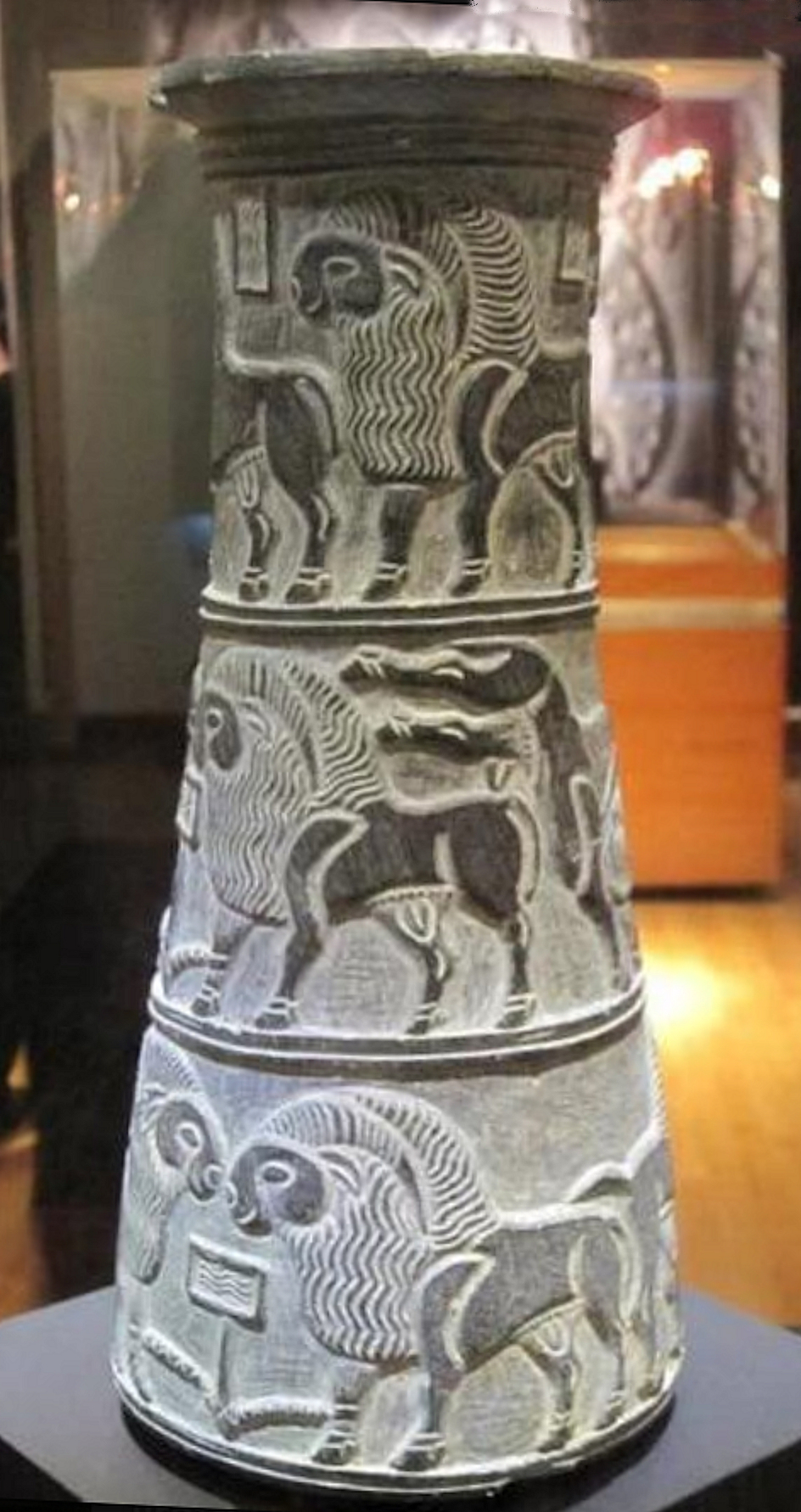
The area of Jiroft and the Jiroft culture may correspond to the ancient country of Marhashi.

== See also ==
- Cities of the ancient Near East
- Jiroft culture
- Meluhha
- Aratta
- Hamazi
