= Abalgamash =

Abalgamash 𒀀𒁀𒀠𒂵𒈦
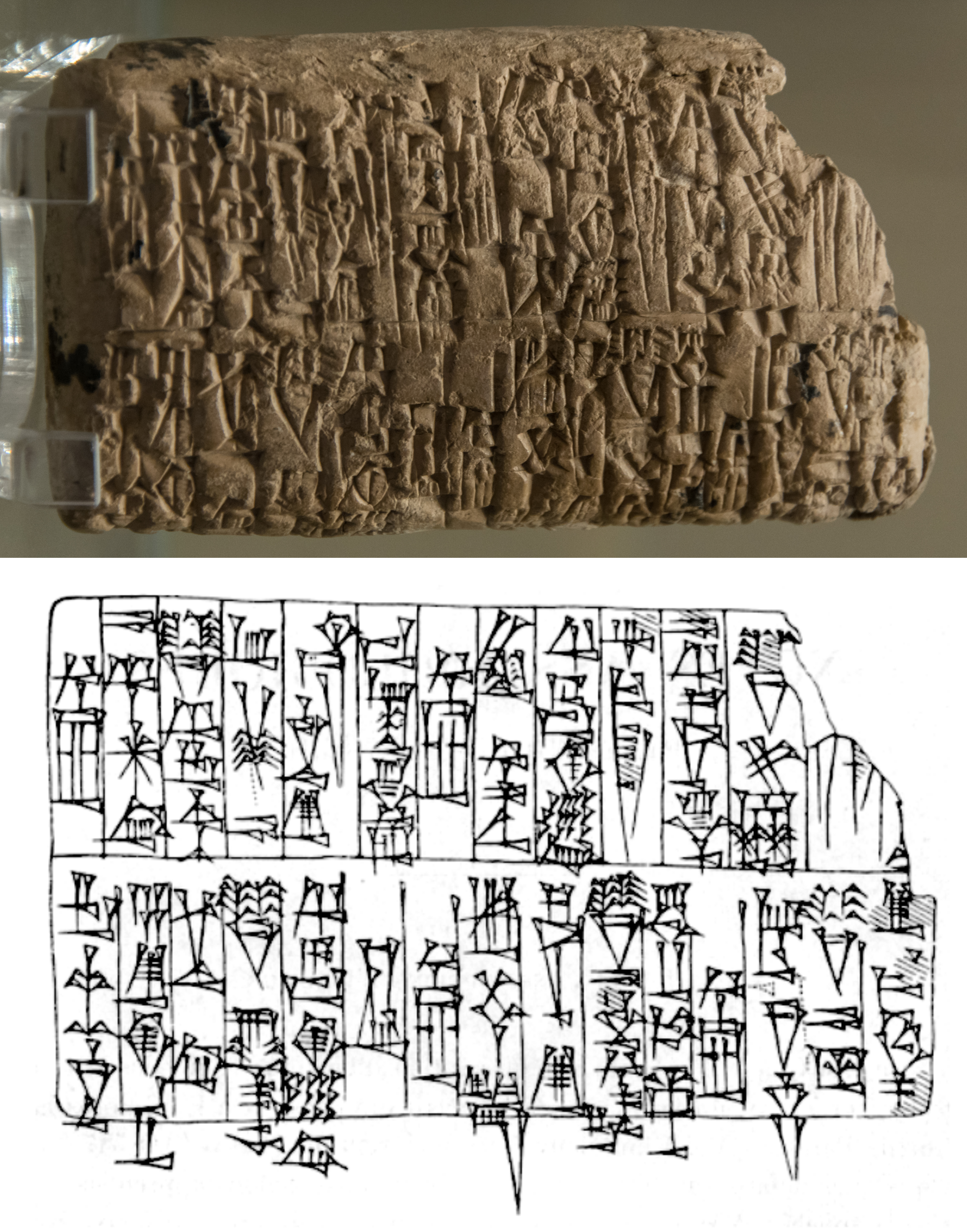
- Account of the victories of Rimush, king of Akkad, over Abalgamash, king of Marhashi, and upon Elamite cities. Louvre Museum AO5476. In several inscriptions, Rimush described his conquest of Elam and Marhashi far to the east of Sumer, even mentioning victories over troops of Meluhha (probably Pakistan).

King of Marhashi
- Reign: c. 2370 BC

Marhashi was located to the east of Akkad

Abalgamash (𒀀𒁀𒀠𒂵𒈦 a-ba-al-ga-masz; fl. c. 2370 BC) was a king of Marhashi ("Parahshum" in Akkadian), somewhere on the Iranian plateau. He seems to have led the forces of Elam, Marhashi, Kupin, Zahara, and Meluhha into a coalition against Akkad, invading Khuzestan, which had been occupied by Sargon. This led to a direct conflict with Rimush, Sargon's son and successor, who in turn invaded Elam, and victoriously confronted their armies somewhere between Awan and Susa.

Abalgamash appears in the records of the Rimush, the ruler of Akkad at the time, who led victorious campaigns against Elam and Marhashi (Sumerian name for the Akkadian "Parahshum"). According to the account, troops from (Meluhha) also participated in the conflict:

"Rimuš, the king of the world, in battle over Abalgamash, king of Parahshum, was victorious. And Zahara and Elam and Gupin and Meluḫḫa within Paraḫšum assembled for battle, but he (Rimush) was victorious and struck down 16,212 men and took 4,216 captives. Further, he captured Ehmahsini, King of Elam, and all the nobles of Elam. Further he captured Sidaga'u the general of Paraḫšum and Sargapi, general of Zahara, in between the cities of Awan and Susa, by the "Middle River". Further a burial mound at the site of the town he heaped up over them. Furthermore, the foundations of Paraḫšum from the country of Elam he tore out, and so Rimuš, king of the world, rules Elam, (as) the god Enlil had shown..."

— Inscription of Rimush (RIME 2.01.02.08).

The campaign resulted in 16,212 killed on the side of the enemies, and 4,216 prisoners. Rimush also came back with an important booty taken from Elam, consisting in 300 minas of gold (about 180 kilograms), 3,600 minas of silver, 300 slaves, and vases of diorite and chlorite. These events apparently put an end to the influence of Marhashi in Elam.

Abalgamash had a general named Sidgau, who is also known to have been in conflict against Sargon, the father of Rimush, when Sargon led his campaign against Elam and Marhashi.

It has been argued that both names Abalgamash and Sidgau may be Hurrian.

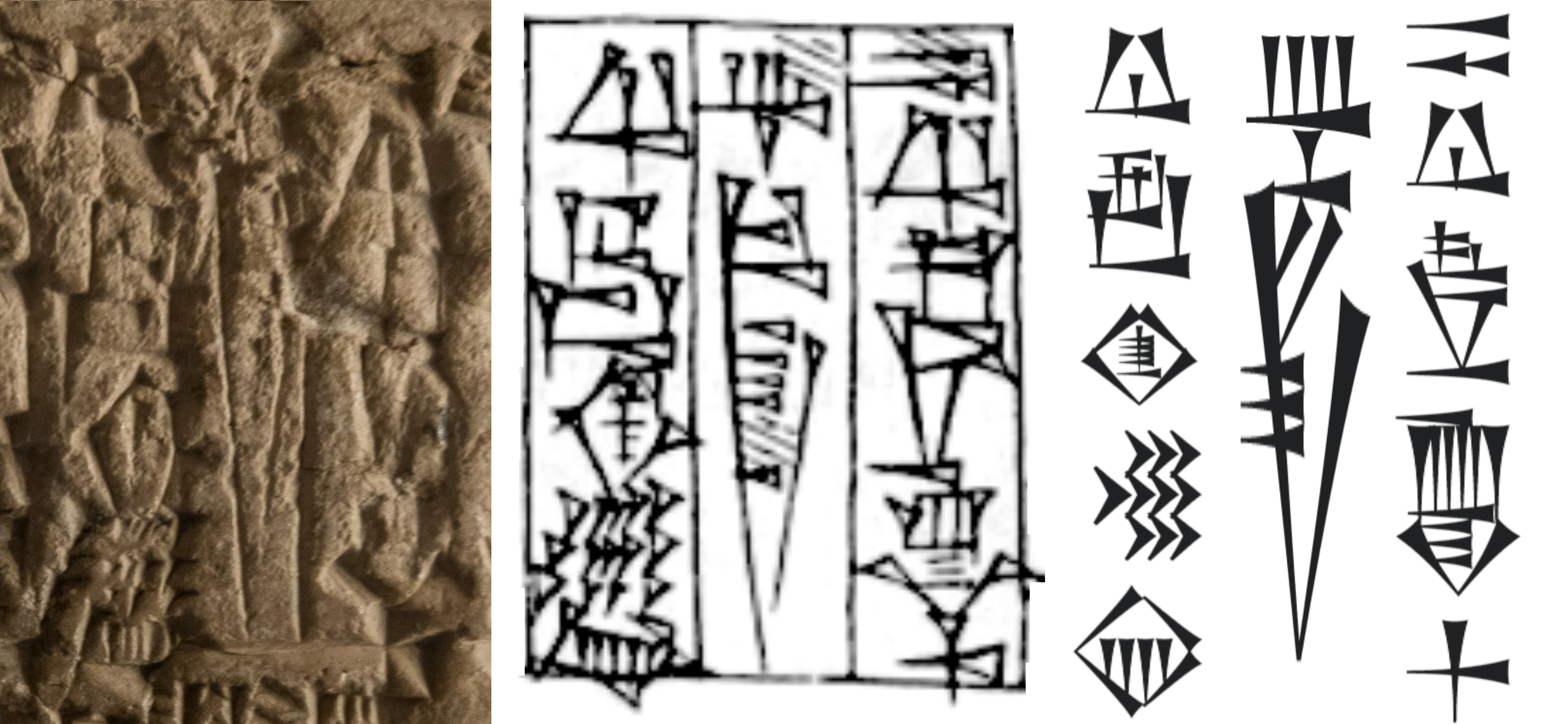
"Abalgamash, King of Marhashi" (𒀀𒁀𒀠𒂵𒈦 𒈗 𒁀𒊏𒄴𒋧𒆠 Abalgamash Lugal Paraahshum-ki) on one of the Rimush inscriptions (Louvre Museum, AO 5476)
